= List of endemic plants of New Caledonia =

New Caledonia is an archipelago in the South Pacific. It includes the main island of Grande Terre, the Loyalty Islands, the Chesterfield Islands, the Belep archipelago, the Isle of Pines, and a few remote islets. Politically New Caledonia is a sui generis collectivity of France, while it is recognized as a distinct botanical country by the World Geographical Scheme for Recording Plant Distributions.

New Caledonia is home to dozens of endemic species and subspecies of vascular plants, including the endemic plant families Amborellaceae, Oncothecaceae, and Phellinaceae, and the endemic genera Achlydosa, Acropogon, Amborella, Amphorogyne, Apiopetalum, Arillastrum, Arthroclianthus, Artia, Austrotaxus, Basselinia, Beauprea, Beaupreopsis, Bocquillonia, Bopopia, Burretiokentia, Campynemanthe, Canacomyrica, Cerberiopsis, Chamaedendron, Chambeyronia, Clematepistephium, Clinosperma, Cloezia, Cocconerion, Codia, Coilochilus, Comptonella, Crossosperma, Cyathopsis, Cyphokentia, Cyphophoenix, Daenikera, Deltaria, Depanthus, Dicarpellum, Dutailliopsis, Dutaillyea, Eriaxis, Eucarpha, Gastrolepis, Gonatostylis, Gongrodiscus, Greslania, Hachettea, Hooglandia, Jaffrea, Kanakomyrtus, Kibaropsis, Longetia, Loxodiscus, Mangenotiella, Maxwellia, Menepetalum, Montrouziera, Myodocarpus, Myrtastrum, Myrtopsis, Myricanthe, Nemuaron, Neoguillauminia, Neoschmidia, Nephrodesmus, Normandia, Oncotheca, Pachyplectron, Pancheria, Paracryphia, Parasitaxus, Peripterygia, Phelline, Picrella, Platyspermation, Pleurocalyptus, Podonephelium, Purpureostemon, Pycnandra, Salaciopsis, Scagea, Solmsia, Sparattosyce, Storthocalyx, Strasburgeria, Stromatopteris, Thiollierea, and Virotia.

Plants are listed alphabetically by plant family. Extinct and presumed extinct species are indicated with †.

== Acanthaceae ==
- † Brunoniella neocaledonica (Heine) Moylan - northwestern New Caledonia
- Dicliptera pubescens Juss.
- Graptophyllum balansae Heine - central New Caledonia
- Graptophyllum macrostemon Heine - northwestern New Caledonia
- Graptophyllum ophiolithicum Heine - northwestern New Caledonia (Mt. Homédéboa)
- Justicia pinensis S.Moore - south-central and southeastern New Caledonia
- Pseuderanthemum comptonii S.Moore
- Pseuderanthemum incisum Benoist - western New Caledonia
- Pseuderanthemum repandum subsp. loyaltyense (Guillaumin) Heine - Loyalty Islands
- Pseuderanthemum repandum subsp. stenopetalum Heine - west-central New Caledonia

== Alseuosmiaceae ==
- Platyspermation Guillaumin
  - Platyspermation crassifolium Guillaumin
- Wittsteinia balansae (Baill.) Steenis

== Amaranthaceae ==
- Atriplex jubata S.Moore

== Amborellaceae ==
- Amborella Baill.
  - Amborella trichopoda Baill. – central New Caledonia

== Anacardiaceae ==
- Euroschinus aoupiniensis Hoff - central New Caledonia
- Euroschinus elegans Engl. - west-central and southeastern New Caledonia
- Euroschinus jaffrei Hoff
- Euroschinus obtusifolius Engl.
  - Euroschinus obtusifolius var. obtusifolius
  - Euroschinus obtusifolius var. robustus Engl. – Loyalty Islands and Î. des Pins
- Euroschinus rubromarginatus Baker f. - west-central and southeastern New Caledonia
- Euroschinus verrucosus Engl. - southeastern New Caledonia
- Euroschinus vieillardii Engl.
- Semecarpus ater (G.Forst.) Vieill.
- Semecarpus balansae Engl.
- Semecarpus neocaledonicus Engl. - southeastern New Caledonia
- Semecarpus poyaensis Hoff - west-central New Caledonia
- Semecarpus riparius Virot - west-central and southeastern New Caledonia
- Semecarpus virotii Hoff - southeastern New Caledonia

== Annonaceae ==
- Goniothalamus dumontetii R.M.K.Saunders & Munzinger
- Goniothalamus hmoope Munzinger & D.M.Johnson - northern New Caledonia
- Goniothalamus obtusatus (Baill.) R.M.K.Saunders
- Meiogyne baillonii (Guillaumin) Heusden
- Meiogyne dumetosa (Vieill. ex Guillaumin) Heusden
- Meiogyne lecardii (Guillaumin) Heusden
- Meiogyne punctulata (Baill.) I.M.Turner & Utteridge
- Xylopia dibaccata Däniker
- Xylopia pallescens Baill. - central-eastern and southeastern New Caledonia
- Xylopia pancheri Baill.
- Xylopia vieillardii Baill.

== Apiaceae ==
- Apiopetalum Baill.
  - Apiopetalum glabratum Baill.
  - Apiopetalum velutinum Baill. - southeastern New Caledonia

== Apocynaceae ==
- Alstonia balansae Guillaumin
- Alstonia boulindaensis Boiteau – central New Caledonia
- Alstonia coriacea Pancher ex S.Moore east-central and southeastern New Caledonia
- Alstonia deplanchei Van Heurck & Müll.Arg. – northwestern and west-central New Caledonia
  - Alstonia deplanchei var. deplanchei – northwestern and west-central New Caledonia
  - Alstonia deplanchei var. ndokoaensis Boiteau – northwestern and west-central New Caledonia
- Alstonia lanceolata Van Heurck & Müll.Arg.
- Alstonia lanceolifera S.Moore – southeastern New Caledonia
- Alstonia legouixiae Van Heurck & Müll.Arg.
- Alstonia lenormandii Van Heurck & Müll.Arg. – north-central and southeastern New Caledonia
  - Alstonia lenormandii var. lenormandii – north-central and southeastern New Caledonia
  - Alstonia lenormandii var. minutiflora Boiteau – north-central and southeastern New Caledonia
- Alstonia odontophora Boiteau – southeastern New Caledonia
- Alstonia quaternata Van Heurck & Müll.Arg. – northwestern and central New Caledonia
- Alstonia sphaerocapitata Boiteau – north-central New Caledonia
- Alstonia vieillardii Van Heurck & Müll.Arg.
- Alyxia baillonii Guillaumin – central and southeastern New Caledonia
- Alyxia caletioides (Baill.) Guillaumin ex Däniker – northwestern New Caledonia
- Alyxia celastrinea (Baill.) Schltr. ex Guillaumin
- Alyxia clusiophylla (Baill.) Guillaumin – west-central and southeastern New Caledonia
- Alyxia cylindrocarpa Guillaumin
- Alyxia dolioliflora Guillaumin – west-southwestern New Caledonia
- Alyxia glaucophylla Van Heurck & Müll.Arg. – central and southeastern New Caledonia
- Alyxia humboldtensis Lannuzel & Gâteblé
- Alyxia hurlimannii Guillaumin
- Alyxia kaalaensis Boiteau – northwestern New Caledonia
- Alyxia leucogyne Van Heurck & Müll.Arg.
- Alyxia loeseneriana Schltr.
- Alyxia margaretae Boiteau – northern and north-central New Caledonia
- Alyxia minimiflora Lannuzel
- Alyxia mucronata D.J.Middleton – northwestern and west-central New Caledonia
- Alyxia nummularia S.Moore – central and southeastern New Caledonia
- Alyxia oppositifolia Boiteau – northwestern and west-northwestern New Caledonia
- Alyxia oubatchensis (Schltr.) Guill. ex Boiteau
- Alyxia paniensis Lannuzel – northern New Caledonia (Mont Panié)
- Alyxia poyaensis (Boiteau) D.J.Middleton – east-central New Caledonia
- Alyxia pseudoserpentina Boiteau – western New Caledonia
- Alyxia rosmarinifolia (Baill.) Guillaumin – south-central New Caledonia
- Alyxia rubricaulis (Baill.) Guillaumin – central and south-central New Caledonia
- Alyxia sarasinii Guillaumin
- Alyxia tisserantii Montrouz.
- Alyxia torquata (Baill.) Guillaumin – west-central and south-central New Caledonia
- Alyxia urceolata Lannuzel
- Alyxia veillonii D.J.Middleton – south-central New Caledonia (Tontouta Valley)
- Artia Guillaumin
  - Artia amieuensis Guillaumin
  - Artia balansae (Baill.) Pichon ex Guillaumin
  - Artia brachycarpa (Baill.) Boiteau – northwestern and central New Caledonia
    - Artia brachycarpa var. brachycarpa – northwestern and central New Caledonia
    - Artia brachycarpa var. coriacea (Guillaumin) Boiteau – northwestern New Caledonia
    - Artia brachycarpa var. lanceolata (Guillaumin) Boiteau – northwestern New Caledonia (î. Art, î. Yandé, î. Baaba)
  - Artia francii (Guillaumin) Pichon
  - Artia lifuana (Baill.) Pichon ex Guillaumin – central New Caledonia (incl. Loyalty Islands)
- Cerberiopsis Vieill. ex Pancher & Sebert
  - Cerberiopsis candelabra Vieill. ex Pancher & Sebert
    - Cerberiopsis candelabra var. candelabra
    - Cerberiopsis candelabra var. vexillaria (Däniker) Boiteau
  - Cerberiopsis neriifolia (S.Moore) Boiteau – southeastern New Caledonia
  - Cerberiopsis obtusifolia (Van Heurck & Müll.Arg.) Boiteau – northwestern New Caledonia
- Heterostemma bicanthaceum Meve, Gâteblé & Liede
- Leichhardtia assimulata (S.Moore) Liede, Gâteblé & Meve – central and southern New Caledonia
- Leichhardtia dognyensis (Guillaumin) Liede, Gâteblé & Meve – northern and central New Caledonia
- Leichhardtia ericoides (Schltr.) Bullock – southeastern New Caledonia
- Leichhardtia goromotoorum (Gâteblé, Fleurot, Meve & Liede) Gâteblé, Fleurot, Meve & Liede – west-central New Caledonia
- Leichhardtia guillauminiana (P.T.Li) Gâteblé, Meve & Liede – northern New Caledonia
- Leichhardtia kaalaensis (Meve, Gâteblé & Liede) Liede, Gâteblé & Meve – northwestern New Caledonia
- Leichhardtia koniamboensis (Guillaumin) Liede, Gâteblé & Meve
- Leichhardtia kuniensis (Meve, Gâteblé & Liede) Liede, Gâteblé & Meve – New Caledonia ( Î des Pins)
- Leichhardtia lyonsioides (Schltr.) Liede, Gâteblé & Meve – northern and central New Caledonia
- Leichhardtia mackeeorum (Meve, Gâteblé & Liede) Liede, Gâteblé & Meve – east-central and southeastern New Caledonia
- Leichhardtia neocaledonica (Meve, Gâteblé & Liede) Liede, Gâteblé & Meve – northwestern and west-northwestern New Caledonia
- Leichhardtia neomicrostoma (Meve, Gâteblé & Liede) Liede, Gâteblé & Meve – northern and west-northwestern New Caledonia
- Leichhardtia nigriflora (Guillaumin) Liede, Gâteblé & Meve – east-central and southeastern New Caledonia
- Leichhardtia oubatchensis (Schltr.) Liede, Gâteblé & Meve – northern New Caledonia
- Leichhardtia paulforsteri (Meve, Gâteblé & Liede) Liede, Gâteblé & Meve – southeastern New Caledonia
- Leichhardtia speciosa (Baill.) Liede, Gâteblé & Meve
- Leichhardtia tylophoroides (Schltr.) Liede, Gâteblé & Meve
- Leichhardtia variifolia (Guillaumin) Liede, Gâteblé & Meve – west-northwestern New Caledonia
- Leichhardtia weari Gâteblé, Meve & Liede
- Leichhardtia weberlingiana (Liede) Liede, Gâteblé & Meve – north-central New Caledonia (col de Hô)
- Melodinus aeneus Baill.
- Melodinus balansae Baill.
- Melodinus philliraeoides Labill.
- Melodinus reticulatus Boiteau – northwestern and southeastern New Caledonia
- Melodinus scandens J.R.Forst. & G.Forst.
- Ochrosia balansae (Guillaumin) Baill. ex Guillaumin
  - Ochrosia balansae var. balansae – northern and southeastern New Caledonia
  - Ochrosia balansae var. excelsior Boiteau – west-central New Caledonia
- Ochrosia bodenheimarum Guillaumin – southeastern New Caledonia (Vallée de la Toutouta)
- Ochrosia brevituba Boiteau – northwestern and north-central New Caledonia
- Ochrosia grandiflora Boiteau – northwestern and central New Caledonia
- Ochrosia inventorum L.Allorge
- Ochrosia lifuana Guillaumin – New Caledonia (Loyalty Islands, Î. des Pins)
- Ochrosia miana Baill. ex Guillaumin
- Ochrosia mulsantii Montrouz. – central and southeastern New Caledonia
- Ochrosia novocaledonica Däniker
- Ochrosia sevenetii Boiteau
- Ochrosia silvatica Däniker – northwestern New Caledonia
- Ochrosia thiollierei Montrouz. – southeastern New Caledonia
- Parsonsia affinis Baill.
- Parsonsia brachiata Baill. ex Guillaumin
- Parsonsia catalpicarpa Baill. – northwestern New Caledonia
- Parsonsia crebriflora Baill.
- Parsonsia edulis (G.Benn.) Guillaumin – west-central and southeastern New Caledonia
- Parsonsia effusa S.Moore
- Parsonsia flexilis Baill. – northwestern New Caledonia
- Parsonsia flexuosa Baill.
- Parsonsia franchetii Baill. ex Guillaumin – New Caledonia (incl. Loyalty Islands)
- Parsonsia laxiflora Guillaumin – west-central New Caledonia
- Parsonsia longiflora Guillaumin – central and southeastern New Caledonia
- Parsonsia macrophylla Pichon ex Guillaumin – central and southeastern New Caledonia
- Parsonsia pachycarpa Guillaumin
- Parsonsia populifolia Baill.
- Parsonsia scabra (Spreng.) Markgr.
- Parsonsia terminaliifolia Guillaumin – northwestern and central New Caledonia
- Rauvolfia balansae (Baill.) Boiteau
  - Rauvolfia balansae subsp. balansae
  - Rauvolfia balansae var. basicola (Boiteau) Boiteau – central and southeastern New Caledonia
  - Rauvolfia balansae subsp. schumanniana (Schltr.) Boiteau – northern and central New Caledonia
- Rauvolfia semperflorens (Müll.Arg.) Schltr.
  - Rauvolfia semperflorens var. insularis Boiteau – New Caledonia (Î. des Pins)
  - Rauvolfia semperflorens var. semperflorens – central and southeastern New Caledonia
  - Rauvolfia semperflorens var. viridis (Müll.Arg.) Boiteau – northwestern and central New Caledonia
- Rauvolfia sevenetii Boiteau – southeastern New Caledonia
- Rauvolfia spathulata Boiteau – southeastern New Caledonia (Mts. des Sources)
- Tabernaemontana cerifera Pancher & Sebert

== Aquifoliaceae ==
- Ilex sebertii Pancher

== Araliaceae ==
- Meryta balansae Baill.
- Meryta coriacea Baill.
- Meryta denhamii Seem.
- Meryta oxylaena Baill.
- Meryta pachycarpa Baill.
- Meryta pandanicarpa Guillaumin
- Meryta rivularis Lowry – northeastern New Caledonia
- Meryta schizolaena Baill.
- Meryta sonchifolia (Linden) Linden & André
- Plerandra baillonii (R.Vig.) Lowry, G.M.Plunkett & Frodin
- Plerandra crassipes (Baill.) Lowry, G.M.Plunkett & Frodin
- Plerandra elegantissima (H.J.Veitch ex Mast.) Lowry, G.M.Plunkett & Frodin – southeastern New Caledonia
- Plerandra elongata (Baill.) Lowry, G.M.Plunkett & Frodin
- Plerandra emiliana (Baill.) Lowry, G.M.Plunkett & Frodin
- Plerandra gabriellae (Baill.) Lowry, G.M.Plunkett & Frodin – New Caledonia (incl. Loyalty Islands)
- Plerandra leptophylla (H.J.Veitch ex T.Moore) Lowry, G.M.Plunkett & Frodin
- Plerandra nono (Baill.) Lowry, G.M.Plunkett & Frodin
- Plerandra osyana (Veitch ex Regel) Lowry, G.M.Plunkett & Frodin
  - Plerandra osyana subsp. osyana
  - Plerandra osyana subsp. toto (Baill.) Lowry, G.M.Plunkett & Frodin
- Plerandra pachyphylla (Harms) Lowry, G.M.Plunkett & Frodin
- Plerandra pancheri (Baill.) Lowry, G.M.Plunkett & Frodin
- Plerandra plerandroides (R.Vig.) Lowry, G.M.Plunkett & Frodin
- Plerandra polydactylis (Montrouz.) Lowry, G.M.Plunkett & Frodin
- Plerandra reginae (Linden ex W.Richards) Lowry, G.M.Plunkett & Frodin
- Plerandra veilloniorum Bernardi ex Lowry, G.M.Plunkett & Frodin
- Plerandra veitchii (Carrière) Lowry, G.M.Plunkett & Frodin – southeastern New Caledonia
- Polyscias balansae (Baill.) Harms
- Polyscias biformis (Philipson) Lowry & G.M.Plunkett
- Polyscias botryophora Harms
- Polyscias bracteata (R.Vig.) Lowry in D.G.Frodin & R.H.A.Govaerts
  - Polyscias bracteata subsp. bracteata
  - Polyscias bracteata subsp. subincisa (R.Vig.) Lowry & G.M.Plunkett
- Polyscias crenata (Pancher & Sebert) Frodin
- Polyscias dioica (Vieill. ex Pancher & Sebert) Harms
- Polyscias lecardii (R.Vig.) Lowry
- Polyscias mackeei Lowry & G.M.Plunkett
- Polyscias microbotrys (Baill.) Harms
- Polyscias otopyrena (Baill.) Lowry & G.M.Plunkett
- Polyscias pancheri (Baill.) Harms
- Polyscias scopoliae (Baill.) Lowry
- Polyscias vieillardii (Baill.) Lowry & G.M.Plunkett
  - Polyscias vieillardii subsp. balansae (Baill.) Lowry & G.M.Plunkett
  - Polyscias vieillardii subsp. vieillardii
- Polyscias weinmanniae (Baill.) Harms
- Schefflera balansana Baill.
- Schefflera candelabrum Baill.
- Schefflera coenosa (R.Vig.) Frodin – southeastern New Caledonia (incl. î. des Pins)
- Schefflera leratii R.Vig.
- Schefflera ouveana (Däniker) Frodin – New Caledonia (Loyalty Islands)
- Schefflera pseudocandelabrum R.Vig.
- Schefflera vieillardii Baill.

== Araucariaceae ==
- Agathis lanceolata Warb.
- Agathis montana de Laub. – northeastern New Caledonia (Mt. Panié)
- Agathis moorei (Lindl.) Mast.
- Agathis ovata (C.Moore ex Vieill.) Warb. – central and southeastern New Caledonia
- Araucaria bernieri J.Buchholz – southeastern New Caledonia
- Araucaria biramulata J.Buchholz
- Araucaria columnaris (G.Forst.) Hook. – southeastern New Caledonia (incl. Loyalty Islands)
- Araucaria goroensis R.R.Mill & Ruhsam
- Araucaria humboldtensis J.Buchholz – southeastern New Caledonia
- Araucaria laubenfelsii Corbasson –southeastern New Caledonia (incl. Î. Art)
- Araucaria luxurians (Brongn. & Gris) de Laub. – central and southeastern New Caledonia (incl. Îs. Bélep)
- Araucaria montana Brongn. & Gris
- Araucaria muelleri (Carrière) Brongn. & Gris – southeastern New Caledonia
- Araucaria nemorosa de Laub. – southeastern New Caledonia (near Port Boisé)
- Araucaria rulei F.Muell.
- Araucaria schmidii de Laub. – northeastern New Caledonia (Mt. Panié)
- Araucaria scopulorum de Laub. northwestern and north-central New Caledonia
- Araucaria subulata Vieill. – southeastern New Caledonia

== Arecaceae ==
- Basselinia Vieill.
  - Basselinia deplanchei (Brongn. & Gris) Vieill. – east-central and southeastern New Caledonia
  - Basselinia eriostachys (Brongn.) Becc.
  - Basselinia favieri H.E.Moore – northeastern New Caledonia (E. Mt. Panié)
  - Basselinia glabrata Becc. – northeastern New Caledonia
  - Basselinia gracilis (Brongn. & Gris) Vieill.
  - Basselinia humboldtiana (Brongn.) H.E.Moore – east-central New Caledonia
  - Basselinia iterata H.E.Moore – northeastern New Caledonia
  - Basselinia moorei Pintaud & F.W.Stauffer
  - Basselinia pancheri (Brongn. & Gris) Vieill. – western and southern New Caledonia
  - Basselinia porphyrea H.E.Moore – southwestern New Caledonia
  - Basselinia sordida H.E.Moore – northwestern and west-central New Caledonia
  - Basselinia tomentosa Becc. – south-central New Caledonia (Mt. Nakada, Mt. Nemara)
  - Basselinia velutina Becc.
  - Basselinia vestita H.E.Moore – central New Caledonia (Mé Ori)
- Burretiokentia Pic.Serm.
  - Burretiokentia dumasii Pintaud & Hodel – west-central New Caledonia (Mé Maoya massif)
  - Burretiokentia grandiflora Pintaud & Hodel – southeastern New Caledonia
  - Burretiokentia hapala H.E.Moore – northern New Caledonia
  - Burretiokentia koghiensis Pintaud & Hodel – southeastern New Caledonia
  - Burretiokentia vieillardii (Brongn. & Gris) Pic.Serm.
- Chambeyronia Vieill.
  - Chambeyronia divaricata (Brongn.) Hodel & C.F.Barrett – central and southeastern New Caledonia
  - Chambeyronia houailouensis Hodel & C.F.Barrett
  - Chambeyronia huerlimannii (H.E.Moore) Hodel & C.F.Barrett – southeastern New Caledonia
  - Chambeyronia lepidota H.E.Moore – northeastern New Caledonia
  - Chambeyronia macrocarpa (Brongn.) Vieill. ex Becc.
  - Chambeyronia magnifica (H.E.Moore) Hodel & C.F.Barrett northeastern New Caledonia
  - Chambeyronia oliviformis (Brongn. & Gris) Hodel & C.F.Barrett – central New Caledonia
  - Chambeyronia piersoniorum (Pintaud & Hodel) Hodel & C.F.Barrett – northeastern New Caledonia (E. Mt. Panié)
  - Chambeyronia pyriformis (Pintaud & Hodel) Hodel & C.F.Barrett – southeastern New Caledonia
- Clinosperma Becc.
  - Clinosperma bractealis (Brongn.) Becc. – central and southern New Caledonia
  - Clinosperma lanuginosa (H.E.Moore) Pintaud & W.J.Baker – northeastern New Caledonia
  - Clinosperma macrocarpa (H.E.Moore) Pintaud & W.J.Baker – northeastern New Caledonia (E. Mt. Panié)
  - Clinosperma vaginata (Brongn.) Pintaud & W.J.Baker – southern New Caledonia
- Cyphokentia Brongn.
  - Cyphokentia cerifera (H.E.Moore) Pintaud & W.J.Baker – northeastern and central New Caledonia
  - Cyphokentia macrostachya Brongn. – central and southern New Caledonia
- Cyphophoenix H.Wendl. ex Hook.f.
  - Cyphophoenix alba (H.E.Moore) Pintaud & W.J.Baker – northeastern New Caledonia
  - Cyphophoenix elegans (Brongn. & Gris) H.Wendl. ex Salomon – northeastern New Caledonia
  - Cyphophoenix fulcita (Brongn.) H.Wendl. ex Salomon – southern New Caledonia
  - Cyphophoenix nucele H.E.Moore – New Caledonia (Loyalty Islands)
- Cyphosperma balansae (Brongn.) H.Wendl. ex Salomon – northeastern and central New Caledonia
- Saribus jeanneneyi (Becc.) Bacon & W.J.Baker – southern New Caledonia

== Argophyllaceae ==
- Argophyllum brevipetalum Guillaumin
- Argophyllum ellipticum Labill.
- Argophyllum grunowii Zahlbr.
- Argophyllum montanum Schltr.
- Argophyllum nitidum J.R.Forst. & G.Forst.
- Argophyllum riparium Pillon & Hequet
- Argophyllum vernicosum Däniker

== Asparagaceae ==
- Arthropodium neocaledonicum Baker
- Cordyline neocaledonica (Baker) B.D.Jacks.
- Lomandra insularis Schltr.

== Asphodelaceae ==
- Dianella acutifolia Schlittler
- Dianella daenikeri Schlittler
- Dianella pendula Schlittler – New Caledonia (Loyalty Islands)
- Dianella plicata Schlittler
- Dianella stipitata Schlittler

== Aspleniaceae ==
- Asplenium dognyense Rosenst.
- Asplenium filidens Brownlie
- Asplenium francii Rosenst.
- Asplenium novae-caledoniae Hook.
- Asplenium oligolepidum C.Chr.
- Asplenium pseudobulbiferum Brownlie
- Asplenium pseudotenerum Brownlie
- Asplenium vieillardii Mett.
- Blechnum austrocaledonicum Christenh.
- Blechnum chauliodontum Copel.
- Blechnum confusum (E.Fourn.) Brownlie
- Blechnum corbassonii Brownlie
- Blechnum deplanchei (Baker) C.Chr. – central and southern New Caledonia
- Blechnum diversifolium Mett.
- Blechnum francii Rosenst.
- Blechnum lenormandii (Baker) Diels
- Blechnum moorei C.Chr.
- Blechnum oceanicum (Rosenst.) Brownlie
- Blechnum subcordatum (E.Fourn.) Brownlie
- Blechnum vieillardii Mett.
- Diplazium rosenstockii (Copel.) Brownlie – New Caledonia (Loyalty Islands)
- Hymenasplenium neocaledonicum Li Bing Zhang & K.W.Xu
- Thelypteris novae-caledoniae (Holttum) Christenh.

== Asteliaceae ==
- Astelia neocaledonica Schltr.

== Asteraceae ==
- Blumea canalensis S.Moore
- Brachyglottis caledoniae (Biehler) DC.
- Helichrysum neocaledonicum Schltr.
- Lagenophora sinuosa Lannuzel
- Ozothamnus cinereus (Labill.) Sweet
- Ozothamnus pinifolius (G.Forst.) DC.
- Pytinicarpa comptonii Gâteblé, Lannuzel & M.Pignal – west-northwestern New Caledonia
- Pytinicarpa kaalaensis Lannuzel, Gâteblé & M.Pignal – west-northwestern New Caledonia
- Pytinicarpa sarasinii (Däniker) G.L.Nesom – west-northwestern New Caledonia
- Pytinicarpa tonitrui Lannuzel, Gâteblé & M.Pignal – northern New Caledonia
- Vittadinia simulans N.T.Burb.
- Vittadinia spathulata F.Muell. ex Sond.

== Atherospermataceae ==
- Nemuaron Baill.
  - Nemuaron vieillardii (Baill.) Baill.

== Balanopaceae ==
- Balanops balansae Baill. – New Caledonia (Mt. Mou, Mt. Nékando)
- Balanops microstachya Baill. – northern New Caledonia
- Balanops oliviformis Baill. – central New Caledonia
- Balanops pachyphylla Baill. ex Guillaumin
- Balanops pancheri Baill.
- Balanops sparsifolia (Schltr.) Hjelmq.
- Balanops vieillardii Baill. – southeastern New Caledonia (incl. î. des Pins)
- Hachettea Baill.
  - Hachettea austrocaledonica Baill.

== Bignoniaceae ==
- Deplanchea sessilifolia (Vieill. ex Pancher) Steenis
- Deplanchea speciosa Vieill.

== Brassicaceae ==
- Rorippa neocaledonica Jonsell

== Burseraceae ==
- Canarium balansae Engl. – New Caledonia (Loyalty Islands)
- Canarium oleiferum Baill.
- Canarium trifoliolatum Engl.
- Canarium whitei Guillaumin

== Calophyllaceae ==
- Calophyllum caledonicum Vieill. ex Planch. & Triana
- Mammea neurophylla (Schltr.) Kosterm.

== Campynemataceae ==
- Campynemanthe Baill.
  - Campynemanthe neocaledonica (Rendle) Goldblatt
  - Campynemanthe parva Goldblatt – southeastern New Caledonia
  - Campynemanthe viridiflora Baill. – southeastern New Caledonia

== Cannabaceae ==
- Celtis balansae Planch.
- Celtis conferta subsp. conferta
- Celtis hypoleuca Planch.

== Capparaceae ==
- Capparis artensis var. dielsiana (Schltr.) Fici
- Capparis parvifolia Fici – New Caledonia (Mt. Kaala)

== Cardiopteridaceae ==
- Citronella hirsuta Munzinger
- Citronella macrocarpa Hürl.
- Citronella sarmentosa (Baill.) R.A.Howard

== Casuarinaceae ==
- Casuarina collina J.Poiss. ex Pancher & Sebert
- Casuarina potamophila Schltr.
- Casuarina tenella Schltr.
- Casuarina teres Schltr.
- Gymnostoma chamaecyparis (Poiss.) L.A.S.Johnson
- Gymnostoma deplancheanum (Miq.) L.A.S.Johnson
- Gymnostoma glaucescens (Schltr.) L.A.S.Johnson
- Gymnostoma intermedium (Poiss.) L.A.S.Johnson
- Gymnostoma leucodon (Poiss.) L.A.S.Johnson
- Gymnostoma nodiflorum (Thunb.) L.A.S.Johnson
- Gymnostoma poissonianum (Schltr.) L.A.S.Johnson
- Gymnostoma webbianum (Miq.) L.A.S.Johnson

== Celastraceae ==
- Denhamia fournieri (Pancher & Sebert) M.P.Simmons
  - Denhamia fournieri subsp. drakeana (Loes.) M.P.Simmons – east-central and southeastern New Caledonia
  - Denhamia fournieri subsp. fournieri
- Dicarpellum (Loes.) A.C.Sm.
  - Dicarpellum baillonianum (Loes.) A.C.Sm. – northern and southeastern New Caledonia
  - Dicarpellum pancheri (Baill.) A.C.Sm.
  - Dicarpellum paucisepalum Hürl. ex M.P.Simmons – northwestern and central New Caledonia
  - Dicarpellum pronyense (Guillaumin) A.C.Sm. southeastern New Caledonia
- Elaeodendron brachycremastron Guillaumin – northwest New Caledonia
- Elaeodendron bupleuroides (Guillaumin) R.H.Archer – southeastern New Caledonia
- Elaeodendron parvifolium R.H.Archer – northwestern New Caledonia (Mt. Taom)
- Elaeodendron pininsulare Hürl. – New Caledonia (Î. des Pins)
  - Elaeodendron pininsulare subsp. pininsulare – New Caledonia (Î. des Pins)
  - Elaeodendron pininsulare subsp. poyaense (I.H.Müll.) R.H.Archer – west-central New Caledonia
- Menepetalum Loes.
  - Menepetalum cassinoides Loes. – central and southeastern New Caledonia
  - Menepetalum cathoides Loes. – central and southeastern New Caledonia
  - Menepetalum salicifolium Loes. – northern New Caledonia
  - Menepetalum schlechteri Loes.
    - Menepetalum schlechteri subsp. crassiusculum I.H.Müll. – west-central New Caledonia
    - Menepetalum schlechteri subsp. schlechteri
- Peripterygia Loes.
  - Peripterygia marginata (Baill.) Loes.
- Salaciopsis Baker f.
  - Salaciopsis glomerata Hürl. – central and southeastern New Caledonia
  - Salaciopsis longistyla I.H.Müll. – northern New Caledonia
  - Salaciopsis megaphylla (Poiss. ex Guillaumin) Loes. – western and central New Caledonia
  - Salaciopsis neocaledonica Baker f. – northern and central New Caledonia
  - Salaciopsis sparsiflora Hürl.
  - Salaciopsis tiwakae I.H.Müll. – north-central New Caledonia

== Chloranthaceae ==
- Ascarina rubricaulis Solms
- Ascarina solmsiana Schltr. – northwestern New Caledonia
  - Ascarina solmsiana var. grandifolia Jérémie – southeastern New Caledonia
  - Ascarina solmsiana var. solmsiana – northwestern New Caledonia

== Chrysobalanaceae ==
- Hunga cordata Prance – northwestern New Caledonia
- Hunga gerontogea (Schltr.) Prance – northwestern New Caledonia
- Hunga guillauminii Prance – northwestern New Caledonia
- Hunga lifouana (Däniker) Prance – northern New Caledonia (incl. Loyalty Islands)
- Hunga mackeeana Prance
- Hunga minutiflora (Baker f.) Prance – southeastern New Caledonia
- Hunga myrsinoides (Schltr.) Prance
- Hunga rhamnoides (Guillaumin) Prance
- Garcinia amplexicaulis Vieill. ex Pierre
- Garcinia australis Montrouz.
- Garcinia balansae Pierre
- Garcinia comptonii Baker f.
- Garcinia corallina Vieill.
- Garcinia corymbosa (Pancher & Sebert) Baker f.
- Garcinia densiflora Pierre
- Garcinia hennecartii Pierre ex Schltr. – southeastern New Caledonia
- Garcinia mungotia Planch. ex Pierre
- Garcinia neglecta Vieill.
- Garcinia pancheri Pierre
- Garcinia pedicellata (G.Forst.) Seem.
- Garcinia puat (Montrouz.) Guillaumin
- Garcinia urceolata Munzinger, Bruy & M.Pignal
- Garcinia vieillardii Pierre
- Garcinia virgata (Vieill. ex Guillaumin) Govaerts

== Clusiaceae ==
- Montrouziera Pancher ex Planch. & Triana
  - Montrouziera cauliflora Planch. & Triana
  - Montrouziera gabriellae Baill.
  - Montrouziera rhodoneura Schltr.
  - Montrouziera sphaeroidea Pancher ex Planch. & Triana
  - Montrouziera spheriflora Pancher
  - Montrouziera verticillata Planch. & Triana

== Combretaceae ==
- Terminalia cherrieri MacKee
- Terminalia gatopensis Guillaumin
- Terminalia novocaledonica Däniker
- Terminalia rubricarpa Baker f.

== Connaraceae ==
- Rourea balansana Baill.

== Convolvulaceae ==
- Ipomoea inopinata (Heine) J.R.I.Wood & Scotland

== Corynocarpaceae ==
- Corynocarpus dissimilis Hemsl.

== Cucurbitaceae ==
- Zehneria neocaledonica W.J.de Wilde & Duyfjes
- Zehneria pentaphylla (Naudin) M.D.Dwivedi, A.K.Pandey & H.Schaef.

== Cunoniaceae ==
- Codia J.R.Forst. & G.Forst.
  - Codia albicans Vieill. ex Pamp. – central and north-central New Caledonia
  - Codia albifrons (Brongn. ex Schinz & Guillaumin) Baker f. – southeastern New Caledonia
  - Codia belepensis H.C.Hopkins – northwestern New Caledonia
  - Codia × cinerascens (Pamp.) H.C.Hopkins (C. albicans × C. spatulata)
  - Codia discolor (Brongn. & Gris) Guillaumin – central and southeastern New Caledonia
  - Codia ferruginea Brongn. & Gris – central-eastern New Caledonia
  - Codia fusca (Schltr.) H.C.Hopkins – southeastern New Caledonia
  - Codia incrassata Pamp. – northern and north-central New Caledonia
  - Codia jaffrei H.C.Hopkins & Fogliani – southeastern New Caledonia
  - Codia mackeeana H.C.Hopkins & Fogliani – central New Caledonia
  - Codia microphylla Vieill. ex Guillaumin – northwestern New Caledonia
  - Codia montana J.R.Forst. & G.Forst. – northwestern and central New Caledonia
  - Codia nitida Schltr. – west-northwestern and southeastern New Caledonia
  - Codia spatulata Brongn. & Gris
  - Codia triverticillata H.C.Hopkins & Pillon – west-central New Caledonia
  - Codia xerophila Pillon, H.C.Hopkins & Gâteblé
- Cunonia × alticola Guillaumin (C. balansae × C. pterophylla) – southeastern New Caledonia
- Cunonia aoupiniensis Hoogland – northern and central New Caledonia
- Cunonia atrorubens Schltr. – southeastern New Caledonia
- Cunonia austrocaledonica Brongn. ex Guillaumin
- Cunonia balansae Brongn. & Gris
- Cunonia × bernieri Guillaumin (C. atrorubens × C. lenormandii) – southeastern New Caledonia
- Cunonia bopopensis Pillon & H.C.Hopkins – New Caledonia (Mt. Tchingou)
- Cunonia bullata Brongn. & Gris – southeastern New Caledonia
- Cunonia cerifera Hoogland – southeastern New Caledonia
- Cunonia deplanchei Brongn. & Gris – southeastern New Caledonia
- Cunonia dickisonii Pillon & H.C.Hopkins – southeastern New Caledonia
- Cunonia × koghicola H.C.Hopkins, J.Bradford & Pillon (C. balansae × C. pulchella) – southeastern New Caledonia
- Cunonia lenormandii Vieill. ex Brongn. & Gris
- Cunonia linearisepala (Guillaumin) Bernardi – northern and southeastern New Caledonia
- Cunonia macrophylla Brongn. & Gris – southeastern New Caledonia
- Cunonia montana (Brongn. & Gris) Schltr. – central and southeastern New Caledonia
- Cunonia pseudoverticillata Guillaumin – southeastern New Caledonia
- Cunonia pterophylla (Brongn. & Gris) Schltr. – southeastern New Caledonia
- Cunonia pulchella Brongn. & Gris
- Cunonia purpurea Brongn. & Gris – southeastern New Caledonia
- Cunonia rotundifolia Däniker – southeastern New Caledonia
- Cunonia rupicola Hoogland – northern New Caledonia
- Cunonia schinziana Däniker – southeastern New Caledonia
- Cunonia varijuga Hoogland
- Cunonia vieillardii Brongn. & Gris – east-central and southeastern New Caledonia
- Geissois balansae Brongn. & Gris ex Guillaumin central and southern New Caledonia
- Geissois belema Pillon & H.C.Hopkins – New Caledonia (Î. Art)
- Geissois bradfordii H.C.Hopkins – southeastern New Caledonia
- Geissois hippocastanifolia Guillaumin – northern and central New Caledonia
- Geissois hirsuta Brongn. & Gris – central and southeastern New Caledonia
- Geissois lanceolata (Guillaumin) H.C.Hopkins – west-northwestern and west-central New Caledonia
- Geissois magnifica Baker f. – eastern New Caledonia
- Geissois montana Vieill. ex Brongn. & Gris – northeastern and north-central New Caledonia
- Geissois polyphylla Lecard ex Guillaumin – northeastern and central New Caledonia
- Geissois pruinosa Brongn. & Gris
  - Geissois pruinosa var. intermedia (Vieill. ex Pamp.) H.C.Hopkins & Pillon – northern and north-central New Caledonia
  - Geissois pruinosa var. pruinosa
- Geissois racemosa Labill.
- Geissois trifoliolata Guillaumin – east-central and southern New Caledonia
- Geissois velutina Guillaumin ex H.C.Hopkins – southeastern New Caledonia
- Hooglandia McPherson & Lowry
  - Hooglandia ignambiensis McPherson & Lowry – northern New Caledonia
- Pancheria Brongn. & Gris
  - Pancheria ajiearoana H.C.Hopkins, Pillon & J.Bradford – central New Caledonia
  - Pancheria alaternoides Brongn. & Gris – southeastern New Caledonia
  - Pancheria beauverdiana Pamp. – northern New Caledonia
  - Pancheria billardierei (D.Don) Pamp.
  - Pancheria brunhesii Pamp.
  - Pancheria calophylla Guillaumin
  - Pancheria communis Baker f. – southeastern New Caledonia
  - Pancheria confusa Guillaumin
  - Pancheria dognyensis H.C.Hopkins, Pillon & J.Bradford – northern and central New Caledonia
  - Pancheria elegans Brongn. & Gris
  - Pancheria engleriana Schltr.
  - Pancheria ferruginea Brongn. & Gris – southeastern New Caledonia
  - Pancheria gatopensis Vieill. ex Guillaumin
  - Pancheria × heterophylla Vieill. ex Guillaumin (P. gatopensis × P. hirsuta) – southern New Caledonia
  - Pancheria hirsuta Vieill. ex Pamp. – southeastern New Caledonia
  - Pancheria humboldtiana Guillaumin – southeastern New Caledonia
  - Pancheria × lanceolata (Pamp.) Baker f. (P. elegans × P. gatopensis) – eastern New Caledonia
  - Pancheria mcphersonii H.C.Hopkins, Pillon & J.Bradford – northern New Caledonia
  - Pancheria minima J.Bradford – northern New Caledonia
  - Pancheria multijuga Guillaumin ex H.C.Hopkins & J.Bradford – southeastern New Caledonia
  - Pancheria ouaiemensis J.Bradford – northern New Caledonia
  - Pancheria phillyreoides Brongn. & Gris ex Guillaumin
  - Pancheria reticulata Guillaumin
  - Pancheria robusta Guillaumin – southeastern New Caledonia
  - Pancheria rubrivenia Baker f. – north-central New Caledonia
  - Pancheria ternata Brongn. & Gris
  - Pancheria xaragurensis H.C.Hopkins & Pillon – southeastern New Caledonia
- Pterophylla dichotoma (Brongn. & Gris) Pillon & H.C.Hopkins
  - Pterophylla dichotoma var. dichotoma
  - Pterophylla dichotoma var. monticola (Däniker) Pillon & H.C.Hopkins
- Pterophylla ouaiemensis (Guillaumin & Virot) Pillon & H.C.Hopkins – northern New Caledonia
- Pterophylla paitensis (Schltr.) Pillon & H.C.Hopkins – central and southeastern New Caledonia
- Pterophylla serrata (Brongn. & Gris) Pillon & H.C.Hopkins
- Spiraeanthemum brongniartianum Schltr.
- Spiraeanthemum collinum (Hoogland) Pillon – northern and central New Caledonia
- Spiraeanthemum densiflorum Brongn. & Gris – northern and central New Caledonia
- Spiraeanthemum ellipticum Vieill. ex Pamp. – northeastern and southern New Caledonia
- Spiraeanthemum meridionale (Hoogland) Pillon – southeastern New Caledonia
- Spiraeanthemum pedunculatum Schltr. – southeastern New Caledonia
- Spiraeanthemum pubescens Pamp.

== Cupressaceae ==
- Callitris neocaledonica Dümmer – southeastern New Caledonia
- Callitris pancheri (Carrière) Byng – central and southeastern New Caledonia
- Callitris sulcata (Parl.) Schltr. – southeastern New Caledonia
- Libocedrus austrocaledonica Brongn. & Gris
- Libocedrus chevalieri J.Buchholz – New Caledonia (Poindimié, Mt. Humboldt, Mt. Kouakoué)
- Libocedrus yateensis Guillaumin – central and southern New Caledonia (Povila, Bleue-Yaté river, Ouinné river)

== Cyatheaceae ==
- Alsophila stelligera (Holttum) R.M.Tryon
- Cyathea alata (E.Fourn.) Copel.
- Cyathea cicatricosa Holttum
- Dicksonia baudouinii E.Fourn.
- Dicksonia perriei Noben & Lehnert
- Dicksonia thyrsopteroides Mett.
- Sphaeropteris albifrons (Vieill. ex E.Fourn.) R.M.Tryon
- Sphaeropteris novae-caledoniae (Mett.) R.M.Tryon

== Cyperaceae ==
- Anthelepis guillauminii (Kük.) R.L.Barrett, K.L.Wilson & J.J.Bruhl
- Bulbostylis labillardierei (Steud.) Beetle
- Carex dawsonii (Hamlin) K.L.Wilson
- Carex inversonervosa Nelmes
- Chamaedendron (Kük.) Larridon
  - Chamaedendron fragilis (Däniker) Larridon – southeastern New Caledonia
  - Chamaedendron kuekenthaliana (Larridon – east-central New Caledonia
  - Chamaedendron neocaledonica ((Rendle) Larridon – southeastern New Caledonia
  - Chamaedendron nervosa (J.Raynal) Larridon
  - Chamaedendron xyridioides ((Däniker) Larridon – southeastern New Caledonia
- Chorizandra gigantea J.Raynal ex K.L.Wilson
- Cyperus laeteflorens (C.B.Clarke) Kük.
- Fimbristylis neocaledonica C.B.Clarke
- Gahnia microcarpa Guillaumin
- Gahnia novocaledonensis Benl
- Gahnia sinuosa J.Raynal
- Lepidosperma pauperum Kük.
- Lepidosperma perplanum Guillaumin
- Lepidosperma perteres C.B.Clarke
- Machaerina deplanchei (Boeckeler) T.Koyama
- Machaerina veillonis (J.Raynal) K.L.Wilson
- Schoenus microcephalus J.Kern
- Schoenus neocaledonicus C.B.Clarke
- Schoenus rivularis J.Raynal ex K.L.Wilson
- Scleria neocaledonica Rendle
- Scleria ovinux J.Raynal ex Fosberg
- Tetraria arundinacea Sol. ex Vahl) T.Koyama
- Tetraria breviseta (J.Raynal) Larridon – eastern New Caledonia
- Tetraria comosa (C.B.Clarke) T.Koyama
- Tetraria raynaliana Larridon
- Tetraria setacea (J.Raynal) Larridon – southeastern New Caledonia
- Tetraria stagnalis (Däniker) T.Koyama – southeastern New Caledonia
- Tetraria sylvestris (J.Raynal) Larridon

== Dilleniaceae ==
- Hibbertia altigena Schltr.
- Hibbertia baudouinii Brongn. & Gris – southeastern New Caledonia
- Hibbertia bouletii Veillon – southeastern New Caledonia
- Hibbertia comptonii Baker f. – northern New Caledonia
- Hibbertia deplancheana Bureau ex Guillaumin – northwestern and west-central New Caledonia
- Hibbertia ebracteata Bureau ex Guillaumin – southeastern New Caledonia
- Hibbertia emarginata Guillaumin – east-central and southeastern New Caledonia
- Hibbertia favieri Veillon – southeastern New Caledonia
- Hibbertia heterotricha Bureau ex Guillaumin – west-central and southeastern New Caledonia
- Hibbertia lanceolata Bureau ex Guillaumin
- Hibbertia margaretiae Veillon – southeastern New Caledonia
- Hibbertia moratii Veillon – west-central New Caledonia
- Hibbertia nana Däniker – southeastern New Caledonia
- Hibbertia pancheri (Brongn. & Gris) Briq.
- Hibbertia patula Guillaumin – southeastern New Caledonia
- Hibbertia podocarpifolia Schltr. – west-central and southeastern New Caledonia
- Hibbertia pulchella (Brongn. & Gris) Schltr. – southeastern New Caledonia
- Hibbertia rubescens Vieill. ex Guillaumin – northwestern New Caledonia
- Hibbertia tontoutensis Guillaumin – southeastern New Caledonia
- Hibbertia trachyphylla Schltr. – southeastern New Caledonia
- Hibbertia vieillardii (Brongn. & Gris) Gilg – east-central and southeastern New Caledonia
- Hibbertia wagapii Gilg in H.G.A.Engler & K.A.E.Prantl

== Droseraceae ==
- Drosera neocaledonica Raym.-Hamet

== Ebenaceae ==
- Diospyros balansae Guillaumin – east-central and southeastern New Caledonia
- Diospyros brassica F.White – northwestern New Caledonia
- Diospyros calciphila F.White – New Caledonia (Loyalty Islands, Î. des Pins, Î. Nou)
- Diospyros cherrieri F.White – northwestern New Caledonia
- Diospyros flavocarpa (Vieill. ex P.Parm.) F.White – northern New Caledonia
- Diospyros glans F.White – southeastern New Caledonia
- Diospyros hequetiae G.E.Schatz, Lowry & Fleurot
- Diospyros impolita F.White – central New Caledonia
- Diospyros labillardierei F.White
- Diospyros macrocarpa Hiern
- Diospyros margaretae F.White
- Diospyros minimifolia F.White – western New Caledonia
- Diospyros oubatchensis Kosterm. – northwestern and east-central New Caledonia
- Diospyros pancheri Kosterm. – northwestern and southeastern New Caledonia
- Diospyros parviflora (Schltr.) Bakh.
- Diospyros perplexa F.White – northwestern New Caledonia
- Diospyros pustulata F.White – western and southwestern New Caledonia
- Diospyros revolutissima F.White – northwestern and west-central New Caledonia
- Diospyros rufotomentosa G.E.Schatz & Lowry
- Diospyros tireliae F.White – New Caledonia (incl. Î. Pott, Î. Art)
- Diospyros tridentata F.White – northwestern New Caledonia
- Diospyros trisulca F.White – northwestern New Caledonia
- Diospyros umbrosa F.White
- Diospyros veillonii F.White – western New Caledonia
- Diospyros vieillardii (Hiern) Kosterm.
- Diospyros yaouhensis (Schltr.) Kosterm. – central and southeastern New Caledonia

== Elaeocarpaceae ==
- Dubouzetia acuminata Sprague
- Dubouzetia campanulata Pancher ex Brongn. & Gris – southeastern New Caledonia
- Dubouzetia caudiculata Sprague – northwestern New Caledonia
- Dubouzetia confusa Guillaumin & Virot – southeastern New Caledonia
- Dubouzetia dentata A.C.Sm.
- Dubouzetia elegans var. elegans
- Dubouzetia guillauminii Virot – southeastern New Caledonia
- Elaeocarpus alaternoides Brongn. & Gris
- Elaeocarpus baudouinii Brongn. & Gris – central and southeastern New Caledonia
- Elaeocarpus biflorus Tirel – central New Caledonia
- Elaeocarpus brachypodus Guillaumin – east-central and southeastern New Caledonia
- Elaeocarpus bullatus Tirel – northwestern New Caledonia
- Elaeocarpus castaneifolius Guillaumin – southeastern New Caledonia
- Elaeocarpus colnettianus Guillaumin – northwestern New Caledonia
- Elaeocarpus comptonii Baker f. – east-central New Caledonia
  - Elaeocarpus comptonii var. alba Tirel – central and southeastern New Caledonia
  - Elaeocarpus comptonii var. comptonii – east-central New Caledonia
  - Elaeocarpus comptonii var. thyensis – (Guillaumin) Tirel – southeastern New Caledonia
- Elaeocarpus coumbouiensis Guillaumin – south-central and southern New Caledonia
- Elaeocarpus dognyensis Guillaumin
- Elaeocarpus geminiflorus Brongn. & Gris
- Elaeocarpus gordonii Tirel
- Elaeocarpus guillaumii Vieill. – northwestern and east-central New Caledonia
- Elaeocarpus gummatus Guillaumin – central and southeastern New Caledonia
- Elaeocarpus hortensis var. neocaledonica Tirel – central New Caledonia
- Elaeocarpus kaalensis Däniker – northwestern and west-central New Caledonia
- Elaeocarpus leratii Schltr. – northwestern and southeastern New Caledonia
- Elaeocarpus moratii Tirel – northwestern New Caledonia
- Elaeocarpus nodosus Baker f. – northwestern and west-central New Caledonia
- Elaeocarpus ovigerus Brongn. & Gris
- Elaeocarpus pulchellus Brongn. & Gris – central and southeastern New Caledonia
  - Elaeocarpus pulchellus var. oreogena (Schltr.) Weibel ex Tirel – southeastern New Caledonia
  - Elaeocarpus pulchellus var. pulchellus – central and southeastern New Caledonia
- Elaeocarpus rotundifolius Brongn. & Gris
- Elaeocarpus seringii Montrouz. – northwestern and central New Caledonia
- Elaeocarpus spathulatus Brongn. & Gris – northwestern New Caledonia
- Elaeocarpus speciosus Brongn. & Gris
- Elaeocarpus toninensis Baker f.
- Elaeocarpus tremulus Tirel & McPherson
- Elaeocarpus vaccinioides F.Muell. ex Brongn. & Gris – south-central and southeastern New Caledonia
- Elaeocarpus vieillardii Brongn. & Gris – northwestern New Caledonia
  - Elaeocarpus vieillardii var. lecardii (Guillaumin) Tirel
  - Elaeocarpus vieillardii var. vieillardii – northwestern New Caledonia
- Elaeocarpus weibelianus Tirel – northwestern and southeastern New Caledonia
- Elaeocarpus yateensis Guillaumin
- Sloanea billardierei (Vieill.) A.C.Sm. – north-central New Caledonia
- Sloanea haplopoda (Guillaumin) A.C.Sm. – central and southeastern New Caledonia
- Sloanea koghiensis Tirel – east-central and southeastern New Caledonia
- Sloanea lepida Tirel – central New Caledonia
- Sloanea magnifolia Tirel – northern and central New Caledonia
- Sloanea montana (Labill.) A.C.Sm.
- Sloanea ramiflora Tirel – central and southeastern New Caledonia
- Sloanea raynaliana Tirel – northwestern and central New Caledonia
- Sloanea suaveolens Tirel – north-central New Caledonia

== Ericaceae ==
- Cyathopsis Brongn. & Gris
  - Cyathopsis albicans (Brongn. & Gris) Quinn – central and southeastern New Caledonia
  - Cyathopsis floribunda Brongn. & Gris
  - Cyathopsis violaceospicata (Guillaumin) Quinn – northwestern New Caledonia
- Dracophyllum alticola Däniker – southeastern New Caledonia (Massif du Humboldt, Massif de Kouakoue)
- Dracophyllum balansae Virot – southeastern New Caledonia
- Dracophyllum cosmelioides W.R.B.Oliv. – southeastern New Caledonia
- Dracophyllum involucratum Brongn. & Gris – southeastern New Caledonia
- Dracophyllum mackeeanum S.Venter – southeastern New Caledonia
- Dracophyllum ouaiemense Virot – northern New Caledonia (Roche Ouaième)
- Dracophyllum ramosum Pancher ex Brongn. & Gris
- Dracophyllum verticillatum Labill.
- Paphia neocaledonica (Guillaumin) P.F.Stevens
- Paphia paniensis S.Venter & Munzinger
- Styphelia balansae Virot – central and southeastern New Caledonia
- Styphelia coryphila (Guillaumin) Sleumer – southeastern New Caledonia
- Styphelia dammarifolia (Brongn. & Gris) F.Muell. – east-central and southeastern New Caledonia
- Styphelia enervia (Guillaumin) Sleumer – southeastern New Caledonia
- Styphelia longistylis (Brongn. & Gris) Sleumer – southeastern New Caledonia
- Styphelia macrocarpa (Schltr.) Sleumer
  - Styphelia macrocarpa var. breviloba Virot – west-central and southeastern New Caledonia
  - Styphelia macrocarpa var. macrocarpa
- Styphelia pancheri (Brongn. & Gris) F.Muell.
- Styphelia veillonii Virot

== Eriocaulaceae ==
- Eriocaulon comptonii Rendle
- Eriocaulon longipedunculatum Lecomte
- Eriocaulon neocaledonicum Schltr.
- Eriocaulon pancheri Lecomte ex Guillaumin & Beauvis.

== Erythroxylaceae ==
- Erythroxylum novocaledonicum O.E.Schulz

== Escalloniaceae ==
- Polyosma brachystachys Schltr.
- Polyosma discolor Baill.
- Polyosma kouaouana Pillon
- Polyosma leratii Guillaumin
- Polyosma pancheriana Baill.
- Polyosma spicata Baill.

== Euphorbiaceae ==
- Acalypha balansae Guillaumin – New Caledonia (Nouméa Reg.)
- Acalypha pancheriana Baill. – New Caledonia (incl. Loyalty Islands)
- Acalypha pulchrespicata Däniker – New Caledonia (Loyalty Islands)
- Alphandia resinosa Baill. – New Caledonia (Î. Art)
- Baloghia alternifolia Baill.
- Baloghia anisomera Guillaumin – central and southeastern New Caledonia
- Baloghia balansae (Baill.) Pax – central New Caledonia
- Baloghia brongniartii (Baill.) Pax – east-central New Caledonia
- Baloghia buchholzii Guillaumin
- Baloghia bureavii (Baill.) Schltr. – central and southeastern New Caledonia
- Baloghia deplanchei (Baill.) Pax – southeastern New Caledonia
- Baloghia drimiflora (Baill.) Schltr. – northwestern and northern west-central New Caledonia
- Baloghia montana (Müll.Arg.) Pax
- Baloghia neocaledonica (S.Moore) McPherson – southeastern New Caledonia
- Baloghia pininsularis Guillaumin – New Caledonia (Î. des Pins)
- Baloghia pulchella Schltr. ex Pax – New Caledonia (Mt. Dzumac)
- Bocquillonia Baill.
  - Bocquillonia arborea Airy Shaw – New Caledonia (Î. des Pins)
  - Bocquillonia brachypoda Baill. – New Caledonia (incl. Î. Art, Î. des Pins)
  - Bocquillonia brevipes Müll.Arg. – northwestern and north-central New Caledonia
  - Bocquillonia castaneifolia Guillaumin – northwestern New Caledonia (incl. I. Art)
  - Bocquillonia codonostylis (Baill.) Airy Shaw – northwestern New Caledonia (Mt. Panié Reg.)
  - Bocquillonia corneri Bruy
  - Bocquillonia goniorrhachis Airy Shaw – north-central New Caledonia
  - Bocquillonia grandidens Baill. – central and south-central New Caledonia
  - Bocquillonia longipes McPherson – northwestern and west-central New Caledonia
  - Bocquillonia lucidula Airy Shaw – central New Caledonia
  - Bocquillonia montrouzieri Gâteblé & McPherson
  - Bocquillonia nervosa Airy Shaw – northwestern New Caledonia
  - Bocquillonia phenacostigma Airy Shaw – central New Caledonia (Mt. Aoupinié)
  - Bocquillonia rhomboidea (Schltr.) Airy Shaw – southeastern New Caledonia
  - Bocquillonia sessiliflora Baill. – New Caledonia (incl. Loyalty Islands)
  - Bocquillonia spicata Baill. – northwestern and southeastern New Caledonia
- Claoxylon insulanum Müll.Arg. – New Caledonia (incl. Loyalty Islands)
- Cleidion artense Gâteblé & McPherson
- Cleidion claoxyloides Müll.Arg.
- Cleidion lasiophyllum Pax & K.Hoffm. – southeastern New Caledonia
- Cleidion lemurum McPherson – New Caledonia (Grottes de Hienghène)
- Cleidion lochmios McPherson – west-central New Caledonia
- Cleidion macarangoides Guillaumin – central and northwestern New Caledonia
- Cleidion macrophyllum Baill.
- Cleidion marginatum McPherson – east-central New Caledonia
- Cleidion spathulatum Baill.
- Cleidion veillonii McPherson – northwestern New Caledonia
- Cleidion velutinum McPherson – northwestern New Caledonia
- Cleidion verticillatum Baill. – northwestern and southeastern New Caledonia (incl. î. des Pins, Loyalty Islands)
- Cleidion vieillardii var. mareense Guillaumin – New Caledonia (Î. des Pins, Loyalty Islands)
- Cocconerion Baill.
  - Cocconerion balansae Baill. – southeastern New Caledonia
  - Cocconerion minus Baill. – New Caledonia (incl. Loyalty Islands)
- Codiaeum oligogynum McPherson – northwestern New Caledonia
- Codiaeum peltatum (Labill.) P.S.Green – New Caledonia (incl. Loyalty Islands)
- Croton barrabeae Bruy
- Croton cordatulus Airy Shaw – New Caledonia (Poya, Voh)
- Fontainea pancheri (Baill.) Heckel – New Caledonia (incl. Loyalty Islands)
- Homalanthus repandus Schltr. – New Caledonia (incl. Loyalty Islands)
- Homalanthus schlechteri Pax & K.Hoffm. – New Caledonia (incl. Loyalty Islands)
- Macaranga alchorneoides Pax & Lingelsh.
- Macaranga coriacea (Baill.) Müll.Arg. – New Caledonia (incl. Loyalty Islands)
- Macaranga corymbosa (Müll.Arg.) Müll.Arg.
- Macaranga latebrosa Gâteblé & McPherson
- Macaranga lutescens (Pax & Lingelsh.) Pax
- Macaranga meiophylla S.Moore
- Macaranga mista S.Moore
- Macaranga vedeliana (Baill.) Müll.Arg. – New Caledonia (incl. Loyalty Islands )
- Macaranga vieillardii (Müll.Arg.) Müll.Arg. – southeastern New Caledonia
- Myricanthe Airy Shaw
  - Myricanthe discolor Airy Shaw – northwestern New Caledonia
- Neoguillauminia Croizat
  - Neoguillauminia cleopatra (Baill.) Croizat
- Trigonostemon cherrieri Veillon

== Fabaceae ==
- Albizia guillainii Guillaumin
- Archidendropsis fournieri (Vieill.) I.C.Nielsen
  - Archidendropsis fournieri var. auriculata (Charpent. ex E.Fourn.) I.C.Nielsen
  - Archidendropsis fournieri var. fournieri
- Archidendropsis fulgens (Labill.) I.C.Nielsen – northern and central New Caledonia
- Archidendropsis glandulosa (Guillaumin) I.C.Nielsen
- Archidendropsis granulosa (Labill.) I.C.Nielsen
- Archidendropsis lentiscifolia (Benth.) I.C.Nielsen – northwestern New Caledonia
- Archidendropsis macradenia (Harms) I.C.Nielsen – central and southeastern New Caledonia
- Archidendropsis paivana (E.Fourn.) I.C.Nielsen
  - Archidendropsis paivana subsp. balansae I.C.Nielsen
  - Archidendropsis paivana subsp. paivana – northwestern and west-central New Caledonia
  - Archidendropsis paivana subsp. tenuispica (Harms) I.C.Nielsen – south-central and southeastern New Caledonia
- Archidendropsis streptocarpa (E.Fourn.) I.C.Nielsen
- Arthroclianthus Baill.
  - Arthroclianthus andersonii (Seem.) Schindl.
  - Arthroclianthus angustifolius Hochr.
  - Arthroclianthus balansae Schindl.
  - Arthroclianthus cuneatus Schindl.
  - Arthroclianthus deplanchei Hochr.
  - Arthroclianthus grandifolius Baker f.
  - Arthroclianthus leratii Schindl.
  - Arthroclianthus macrobotryosus Hochr.
  - Arthroclianthus macrophyllus Schindl.
  - Arthroclianthus maximus Schindl.
  - Arthroclianthus microbotrys Hochr.
  - Arthroclianthus obovatus Hochr.
  - Arthroclianthus sanguineus Baill.
  - Arthroclianthus sericeus Hochr.
  - Arthroclianthus tenuifolius Schindl.
- Canavalia favieri I.C.Nielsen
- Canavalia veillonii I.C.Nielsen
- Cassia artensis Beauvis.
- Desmodium lagopodioides Endl.
- Indigofera dumbeana M.Pignal & L.P.Queiroz
- Indigofera monieriana M.Pignal & L.P.Queiroz
- Lotus anfractuosus var. anfractuosus
- Mezoneuron baudouinii Guillaumin
- Mezoneuron montrouzieri Guillaumin – western and east-central New Caledonia
- Mezoneuron ouenense (Guillaumin) R.Clark – southeastern New Caledonia (Î. Ouen)
- Mezoneuron rubiginosum (Guillaumin) R.Clark – northwestern and south-central New Caledonia
- Mezoneuron schlechteri (Harms) R.Clark
- Mucuna neocaledonica Baker f.
- Nephrodesmus Schindl.
  - Nephrodesmus francii (Harms) Schindl.
  - Nephrodesmus hochreutineri Schindl. – central New Caledonia
  - Nephrodesmus parvifolius Schindl. – northwestern New Caledonia
  - Nephrodesmus sericeus (Hochr.) Schindl. – northwestern New Caledonia
- Ormocarpum neocaledonicum Arbainsyah
- Oxytes deplanchei (Harms) H.Ohashi & K.Ohashi
  - Oxytes deplanchei var. deplanchei
  - Oxytes deplanchei var. ovalifolia (Däniker) H.Ohashi & K.Ohashi
- Oxytes kaalensis (Guillaumin) H.Ohashi & K.Ohashi
- Oxytes pycnostachya (Benth.) H.Ohashi & K.Ohashi
- Serianthes calycina Benth. – northern and west-northwestern New Caledonia
  - Serianthes calycina var. calycina – northern and west-northwestern New Caledonia
  - Serianthes calycina var. kaalaensis I.C.Nielsen – northwestern New Caledonia
- Serianthes germainii Guillaumin – New Caledonia (Î des Pins)
- Serianthes lifouensis (Fosberg) I.C.Nielsen – New Caledonia (Î Lifou)
- Serianthes margaretiae I.C.Nielsen northwestern and north-central New Caledonia
- Serianthes petitiana Guillaumin – southeastern New Caledonia
- Serianthes sachetae Fosberg
- Storckiella neocaledonica I.C.Nielsen, Labat & Munzinger
- Storckiella pancheri Baill.
  - Storckiella pancheri subsp. acuta I.C.Nielsen, Labat & Munzinger – northern New Caledonia
  - Storckiella pancheri subsp. pancheri – central and southern New Caledonia

== Gesneriaceae ==
- Bopopia Munzinger & J.R.Morel
  - Bopopia parviflora Munzinger & J.R.Morel
- Coronanthera aspera C.B.Clarke
- Coronanthera barbata C.B.Clarke
- Coronanthera clarkeana Schltr.
- Coronanthera deltoidifolia Vieill. ex C.B.Clarke
- Coronanthera pancheri C.B.Clarke
- Coronanthera pedunculosa C.B.Clarke
- Coronanthera pinguior C.B.Clarke
- Coronanthera pulchra C.B.Clarke
- Coronanthera sericea C.B.Clarke
- Coronanthera squamata Virot
- Cyrtandra mareensis Däniker
- Depanthus S.Moore
  - Depanthus glaber (C.B.Clarke) S.Moore
  - Depanthus pubescens Guillaumin

== Gleicheniaceae ==
- Sticherus montaguei (Compton) Nakai
- Stromatopteris Mett.
  - Stromatopteris moniliformis Mett.

== Goodeniaceae ==
- Scaevola balansae Guillaumin
- Scaevola barrierei A.S.Wulff & Munzinger
- Scaevola beckii Zahlbr. – east-central and southeastern New Caledonia
- Scaevola coccinea Däniker – southeastern New Caledonia
- Scaevola erosa Guillaumin – western and southeastern New Caledonia
- Scaevola macropyrena I.H.Müll. –southeastern New Caledonia (Mt. Humboldt)
- Scaevola racemigera Däniker – southeastern New Caledonia (Mt. Humboldt)
- Haloragis prostrata subsp. prostrata

== Hernandiaceae ==
- Hernandia cordigera Vieill.

== Hymenophyllaceae ==
- Hymenophyllum deplanchei Mett.
- Hymenophyllum dimidiatum Mett.
- Hymenophyllum francii (Christ) Ebihara & K.Iwats.
- Hymenophyllum humboldtianum E.Fourn.
- Hymenophyllum leratii Rosenst.
- Hymenophyllum mnioides Baker
- Hymenophyllum neocaledonicum (C.Chr.) Rouhan & C.Del Rio
- Hymenophyllum paniense Ebihara & K.Iwats.
- Hymenophyllum pumilio Rosenst.
- Hymenophyllum rolandi-principis Rosenst.
- Hymenophyllum soriemersum Rouhan & C.Del Rio
- Hymenophyllum subobtusum Rosenst.
- Trichomanes polystromaticum Bierh.
- Trichomanes vieillardii Bosch

== Iridaceae ==
- Patersonia neocaledonica Goldblatt & J.C.Manning

== Lamiaceae ==
- Gmelina evoluta (Däniker) Mabb. – northwestern New Caledonia
- Gmelina lignum-vitreum Guillaumin – southern New Caledonia (Forêt de la Thy)
- Gmelina magnifica Mabb.
- Gmelina neocaledonica S.Moore – southeastern New Caledonia
- Gmelina tholicola Mabb.
- Oxera baladica Vieill.
  - Oxera baladica subsp. baladica
  - Oxera baladica subsp. nuda (Virot) de Kok – southeastern New Caledonia
- Oxera brevicalyx (Moldenke) de Kok – northwestern and west-central New Caledonia
- Oxera coriacea Dubard – central and southeastern New Caledonia
- Oxera coronata de Kok – northern and central New Caledonia
- Oxera crassifolia Virot – southeastern New Caledonia
- Oxera glandulosa Vieill. – southeastern New Caledonia (incl. î. des Pins)
- Oxera gmelinoides S.Moore – southeastern New Caledonia
- Oxera longifolia Vieill.
- Oxera microcalyx Guillaumin – New Caledonia (Plateau de Dogny)
- Oxera morierei Vieill. – northern and central New Caledonia
- Oxera neriifolia (Montrouz.) Beauvis.
  - Oxera neriifolia subsp. neriifolia – southeastern New Caledonia
  - Oxera neriifolia subsp. sororia (Däniker) de Kok – northwestern New Caledonia
- Oxera oreophila Guillaumin – southeastern New Caledonia
- Oxera palmatinervia Dubard – east-central and southeastern New Caledonia
- Oxera pancheri Dubard – southeastern New Caledonia
- Oxera pittosporifolia Guillaumin
- Oxera pulchella Labill.
  - Oxera pulchella subsp. grandiflora (Dubard) de Kok – southeastern New Caledonia
  - Oxera pulchella subsp. pulchella – northwestern and central New Caledonia
- Oxera robusta Vieill. – northeastern New Caledonia
- Oxera rugosa Guillaumin – southeastern New Caledonia
- Oxera sessilifolia Dubard – northwestern and central New Caledonia
- Oxera subverticillata Vieill. – northwestern and central New Caledonia
- Oxera sulfurea Dubard
- Premna guillauminii Moldenke

== Lauraceae ==
- Beilschmiedia neocaledonica Kosterm. – east-central New Caledonia
- Beilschmiedia oreophila Schltr. – central and southeastern New Caledonia
- Cryptocarya adpressa Munzinger & McPherson
- Cryptocarya aristata Kosterm.
- Cryptocarya barrabeae Munzinger & McPherson
- Cryptocarya bitriplinervia Kosterm. – New Caledonia (Kalouéhola)
- Cryptocarya chartacea Kosterm.
- Cryptocarya chrysea Munzinger & McPherson
- Cryptocarya conduplicata Munzinger & McPherson
- Cryptocarya elliptica Schltr.
- Cryptocarya gracilis Schltr. – northwestern and southeastern New Caledonia
- Cryptocarya guillauminii Kosterm. central and southeastern New Caledonia
- Cryptocarya leptospermoides Kosterm. – northwestern and central New Caledonia
- Cryptocarya lifuensis Guillaumin - New Caledonia (Loyalty Islands)
- Cryptocarya longifolia Kosterm. – east-central New Caledonia
- Cryptocarya mackeei Kosterm. – east-central and southeastern New Caledonia
- Cryptocarya macrocarpa Guillaumin – central and southern New Caledonia
- Cryptocarya macrodesme Schltr. – northwestern and central New Caledonia
- Cryptocarya odorata Guillaumin
- Cryptocarya oubatchensis Schltr. – northwestern and central New Caledonia
- Cryptocarya ovoidea Munzinger & McPherson
- Cryptocarya phyllostemon Kosterm. – southeastern New Caledonia
- Cryptocarya pluricostata Kosterm.
- Cryptocarya schmidii Kosterm. – New Caledonia (Loyalty Islands)
- Cryptocarya transversa Kosterm. – central and southeastern New Caledonia
- Cryptocarya velutinosa Kosterm. – northwestern and central New Caledonia
- Endiandra artensis Munzinger & McPherson – New Caledonia (Î. Art)
- Endiandra baillonii (Pancher & Sebert) Guillaumin – southeastern New Caledonia
- Endiandra lecardii Guillaumin – east-central New Caledonia
- Endiandra neocaledonica Kosterm.
- Endiandra polyneura Schltr.
- Endiandra poueboensis Guillaumin – northwestern New Caledonia
- Endiandra sebertii Guillaumin
- Litsea deplanchei Guillaumin
- Litsea humboldtiana Guillaumin – southeastern New Caledonia
- Litsea imbricata Guillaumin – southeastern New Caledonia
- Litsea lecardii Guillaumin
- Litsea longepedunculata Kosterm. – northwestern New Caledonia
- Litsea miana Guillaumin
- Litsea neocaledonica S.Moore – east-central and southeastern New Caledonia
- Litsea ovalis Kosterm. – northwestern and west-central New Caledonia
- Litsea pentaflora Guillaumin – northwestern and southeastern New Caledonia
- Litsea ripidion Guillaumin – southeastern New Caledonia
- Litsea spathuliformis Munzinger & McPherson – central and southern New Caledonia
- Litsea stenophylla Guillaumin – southeastern New Caledonia
- Litsea triflora Guillaumin
- Litsea uniflora Guillaumin – north-central and southeastern New Caledonia

== Lecythidaceae ==
- Barringtonia integrifolia (Montrouz.) Schltr. – New Caledonia (incl. Loyalty Islands)
- Barringtonia longifolia Schltr. – New Caledonia (Mt. Ou-Hinna)
- Barringtonia neocaledonica Vieill.

== Linaceae ==
- Hugonia angustifolia (Stapf) Byng & Christenh.
- Hugonia deplanchei (Stapf) Vieill. ex Guillaumin
- Hugonia latifolia (Vieill.) Schltr.
- Hugonia oreogena Schltr.
- Hugonia papillosa Guillaumin
- Hugonia penicillanthemum Baill
- Hugonia racemosa (Vieill.) Schltr.
- Hugonia viscosa (Stapf) Byng & Christenh.

== Lindsaeaceae ==
- Lindsaea francii Rosenst.
- Lindsaea nervosa Mett.
- Lindsaea prolongata E.Fourn.
- Lindsaea rufa K.U.Kramer
- Lindsaea vieillardii Mett.
- Odontosoria alutacea (Mett.) Perrie & L.D.Sheph.
- Odontosoria angustifolia (Bernh.) C.Chr.

== Loganiaceae ==
- Geniostoma balansanum Baill.
- Geniostoma celastrineum Baill.
- Geniostoma densiflorum var. oleifolium (S.Moore) B.J.Conn
- Geniostoma erythrospermum Baill.
- Geniostoma glaucescens Schltr.
- Geniostoma imbricatum (Guillaumin) C.S.P.Foster & B.J.Conn
- Geniostoma mooreanum B.J.Conn – New Caledonia (Î Lifou)
- Geniostoma novae-caledoniae Vieill. ex Baill.
- Geniostoma rupestre var. crassifolium (Benth.) B.J.Conn
- Geniostoma rupestre var. thymeleaceum (Baill.) B.J.Conn
- Geniostoma vestitum Baill.
- Neuburgia novocaledonica (Gilg & Gilg-Ben.) J.E.Molina & Struwe

== Loranthaceae ==
- Helixanthera balansae (Tiegh.) Danser

== Lycopodiaceae ==
- Huperzia balansae (Herter) Holub
- Huperzia ignambiensis (Compton) Holub
- Huperzia neocaledonica (Nessel) Holub
- Huperzia pseudovaria (Brownlie) Holub
- Huperzia schlechteri (E.Pritz.) Holub

== Malpighiaceae ==
- Acridocarpus austrocaledonicus Baill.
- Stigmaphyllon angustifolium (Nied.) C.E.Anderson
- Stigmaphyllon gymnopodum (Guillaumin) C.E.Anderson
- Stigmaphyllon mackeeanum C.E.Anderson
- Stigmaphyllon mcphersonii C.E.Anderson
- Stigmaphyllon patricianum-firmenichianum Butaud
- Stigmaphyllon taomense (Baker f.) C.E.Anderson

== Malvaceae ==
- Acropogon Schltr.
  - Acropogon aoupiniensis Morat
  - Acropogon austrocaledonicus (Hook.f.) Morat
  - Acropogon bosseri Morat & Chalopin – southeastern New Caledonia
  - Acropogon bullatus (Pancher & Sebert) Morat – New Caledonia (Mt. Dzumac)
  - Acropogon calcicola Morat & Chalopin
  - Acropogon chalopiniae Morat – southeastern New Caledonia
  - Acropogon domatifer Morat
  - Acropogon dzumacensis (Guillaumin) Morat
  - Acropogon fatsioides Schltr. – New Caledonia (near Oubatche)
  - Acropogon francii (Guillaumin) Morat
  - Acropogon grandiflorus Morat & Chalopin – central New Caledonia
  - Acropogon horarius Gâteblé & Munzinger – east-central New Caledonia
  - Acropogon jaffrei Morat & Chalopin – west-central New Caledonia
  - Acropogon macrocarpus Morat & Chalopin – north-central New Caledonia
  - Acropogon margaretae Morat & Chalopin – north-central New Caledonia
  - Acropogon megaphyllus (Bureau & Poiss. ex Guillaumin) Morat
  - Acropogon merytifolius Morat & Chalopin – central New Caledonia
  - Acropogon mesophilus Munzinger & Gâteblé
  - Acropogon moratianus Callm., Munzinger & Lowry
  - Acropogon paagoumenensis Morat & Chalopin
  - Acropogon pilosus Morat & Chalopin
  - Acropogon sageniifolia Schltr. – New Caledonia (near Oubatche)
  - Acropogon schefflerifolius (Guillaumin) Morat
  - Acropogon schistophilus Morat & Chalopin – central and northwestern New Caledonia
  - Acropogon schumanniana Schltr.
  - Acropogon tireliae Morat & Chalopin
  - Acropogon veillonii Morat
- Corchorus neocaledonicus Schltr. – west-northwestern New Caledonia
  - Corchorus neocaledonicus var. estellatus Tirel – northwestern New Caledonia
  - Corchorus neocaledonicus var. neocaledonicus – west-northwestern New Caledonia
- Maxwellia Baill.
  - Maxwellia lepidota Baill.
- Sida bipartita Schltr.
- Sida zahlbruckneri Rech.

== Marattiaceae ==
- Ptisana attenuata (Labill.) Murdock
- Ptisana rolandi-principis (Rosenst.) Christenh. – central New Caledonia
- Ptisana soluta (Compton) Murdock & Perrie

== Meliaceae ==
- Didymocheton canalensis (Baill.) Holzmeyer & Mabb. – central and southeastern New Caledonia
- Didymocheton kouiriensis (Virot) Mabb. – northwestern and central New Caledonia
- Didymocheton macranthus (C.DC.) Harms – northwestern and central New Caledonia
- Didymocheton macrostachyus (C.DC.) Mabb.
- Didymocheton minutiflorus (Baill.) Holzmeyer & Mabb. – southeastern New Caledonia
- Didymocheton pachypodus (Baill.) Harms – central New Caledonia
- Didymocheton roseus (Baill.) Holzmeyer & Mabb. – northern and central New Caledonia
- Didymocheton rufescens (Vieill. ex Pancher & Sebert) Harms
  - Didymocheton rufescens subsp. dzumacensis (Guillaumin) Mabb.
  - Didymocheton rufescens subsp. rufescens

== Menispermaceae ==
- Hypserpa mackeei Forman – southeastern New Caledonia
- Hypserpa vieillardii Diels
- Pachygone loyaltiensis Diels
- Pachygone tomentella Diels – northern and southeastern New Caledonia
- Tinospora neocaledonica Forman

== Metteniusaceae ==
- Apodytes clusiifolia (Baill.) Villiers

== Molluginaceae ==
- Paramollugo digyna (Montrouz.) Sukhor.

== Monimiaceae ==
- Hedycarya aragoensis Jérémie – central New Caledonia
- Hedycarya baudouinii Baill. – north-central and southeastern New Caledonia
- Hedycarya chrysophylla Perkins – northern and central New Caledonia
- Hedycarya cupulata Baill.
- Hedycarya engleriana S.Moore
- Hedycarya erythrocarpa Perkins – southeastern New Caledonia
- Hedycarya parvifolia Perkins & Schltr.
- Hedycarya perbracteolata Jérémie
- Hedycarya rivularis Guillaumin – northern and central New Caledonia
- Hedycarya symplocoides S.Moore – northern and central New Caledonia
- Kibaropsis Vieill. ex Jérémie
  - Kibaropsis caledonica (Guillaumin) Jérémie – northern and central New Caledonia

== Moraceae ==
- Ficus asperula Bureau
  - Ficus asperula var. asperula
  - Ficus asperula var. nuda Bureau
- Ficus auriculigera Bureau
- Ficus austrocaledonica var. balansana (Bureau) Corner
- Ficus barraui Guillaumin
- Ficus cataractorum Vieill. ex Bureau
- Ficus crescentioides Bureau
- Ficus dzumacensis Guillaumin
  - Ficus dzumacensis var. brevipetiolata Guillaumin
  - Ficus dzumacensis var. dzumacensis
- Ficus heteroselis Bureau
- Ficus hurlimannii Guillaumin
- Ficus leiocarpa (Bureau) Warb.
- Ficus lifouensis Corner – New Caledonia (Loyalty Islands)
- Ficus maialis Guillaumin
- Ficus microtophora Corner
- Ficus mutabilis Bureau
- Ficus nitidifolia Bureau
- Ficus otophora Corner & Guillaumin
- Ficus otophoroides Corner
- Ficus pancheriana Bureau
- Ficus pteroporum Guillaumin
- Ficus punctulosa Warb.
- Ficus racemigera Bureau
- Ficus versicolor Bureau
- Ficus vieillardiana Bureau
- Ficus webbiana (Miq.) Miq.
- Paratrophis sclerophylla (Corner) E.M.Gardner
- Sparattosyce Bureau
  - Sparattosyce balansae A.G.Richt. ex Guillaumin
  - Sparattosyce dioica Bureau

== Myodocarpaceae ==
- Delarbrea balansae (Baill.) Lowry & G.M.Plunkett – southeastern New Caledonia
- Delarbrea collina Vieill.
- Delarbrea harmsii R.Vig.
- Delarbrea longicarpa R.Vig. – southeastern New Caledonia
- Delarbrea montana R.Vig.
  - Delarbrea montana subsp. arborea (R.Vig.) Lowry – northern New Caledonia
  - Delarbrea montana subsp. montana – northwestern New Caledonia
- Delarbrea paradoxa subsp. depauperata Lowry
- Myodocarpus Brongn. & Gris
  - Myodocarpus crassifolius Dubard & R.Vig. – southeastern New Caledonia
  - Myodocarpus fraxinifolius Brongn. & Gris – central and southeastern New Caledonia
  - Myodocarpus gracilis (Dubard & R.Vig.) Lowry
  - Myodocarpus involucratus Dubard & R.Vig. – southeastern New Caledonia
  - Myodocarpus lanceolatus Dubard & R.Vig. ex Guillaumin – southeastern New Caledonia
  - Myodocarpus pinnatus Brongn. & Gris – northwestern and central New Caledonia
  - Myodocarpus simplicifolius Brongn. & Gris – northwestern and southeastern New Caledonia
  - Myodocarpus vieillardii Brongn. & Gris

== Myricaceae ==
- Canacomyrica Guillaumin
  - Canacomyrica monticola Guillaumin – southern New Caledonia

== Myrtaceae ==
- Archirhodomyrtus baladensis (Brongn. & Gris) Burret
- Archirhodomyrtus paitensis (Schltr.) Burret
- Archirhodomyrtus turbinata (Schltr.) Burret
- Archirhodomyrtus vieillardii (Brongn. & Gris) Burret
- Arillastrum Pancher ex Baill.
  - Arillastrum gummiferum (Brongn. & Gris) Pancher ex Baill. – central southeastern New Caledonia New Caledonia
- Austromyrtus mendute (Guillaumin) Burret
- Cloezia Brongn. & Gris
  - Cloezia aquarum (Guillaumin) J.W.Dawson – southeastern New Caledonia
  - Cloezia artensis (Montrouz.) P.S.Green
    - Cloezia artensis var. artensis
    - Cloezia artensis var. basilaris J.W.Dawson – southeastern New Caledonia
    - Cloezia artensis var. riparia J.W.Dawson – southeastern New Caledonia
  - Cloezia buxifolia Brongn. & Gris – southeastern New Caledonia
  - Cloezia deplanchei Brongn. & Gris – southeastern New Caledonia
  - Cloezia floribunda Brongn. & Gris – central and southeastern New Caledonia
  - Cloezia × glaberrima (Guillaumin) J.W.Dawson (C. buxifolia × C. floribunda) – southeastern New Caledonia
- Eugenia amosensis N.Snow
- Eugenia balansae Guillaumin
- Eugenia belepiana J.W.Dawson ex N.Snow
- Eugenia brongniartiana Guillaumin
- Eugenia bullata Pancher ex Guillaumin
- Eugenia crucigera Däniker
- Eugenia daaouiensis Guillaumin
- Eugenia daenikeri Guillaumin
- Eugenia ericoides Guillaumin
- Eugenia gacognei Montrouz.
- Eugenia gatopensis Guillaumin – New Caledonia (Gatope)
- Eugenia gomonenensis (Guillaumin) J.W.Dawson & N.Snow
- Eugenia grisiana Guillaumin
- Eugenia gyrosepala Baker f. – New Caledonia (Ngoye River)
- Eugenia homedeboana N.Snow
- Eugenia horizontalis Pancher ex Brongn. & Gris
- Eugenia hurlimannii Guillaumin
- Eugenia insulartensis J.W.Dawson ex N.Snow
- Eugenia kaalensis Guillaumin
- Eugenia kuebuniensis Guillaumin
- Eugenia littoralis Pancher ex Brongn. & Gris
- Eugenia lotoides (Guillaumin) J.W.Dawson & N.Snow – New Caledonia (Gatope)
- Eugenia mackeeana Guillaumin
- Eugenia mouensis Baker f.
- Eugenia noumeensis Guillaumin
- Eugenia ouen-toroensis Guillaumin
- Eugenia ovigera Brongn. & Gris
- Eugenia pachychremastra Guillaumin
- Eugenia paludosa Pancher ex Brongn
- Eugenia plurinervia N.Snow, Munzinger & Callm.
- Eugenia poimbailensis (Guillaumin) J.W.Dawson & N.Snow – New Caledonia (Poimbail)
- Eugenia pronyensis Guillaumin
- Eugenia pterocarpa Baill.
- Eugenia pubiflora N.Snow & Callm. – southern New Caledonia
- Eugenia sarasinii Guillaumin
- Eugenia sicifolia J.W.Dawson & N.Snow
- Eugenia stephanophylla Baker f.
- Eugenia stricta Pancher ex Brongn. & Gris
- Eugenia styphelioides (Schltr.) J.W.Dawson & N.Snow
- Eugenia tchambaensis J.W.Dawson & N.Snow
- Eugenia tiwakaensis J.W.Dawson & N.Snow
- Eugenia veillonii N.Snow & Callm.
- Eugenia virotii Guillaumin
- Gossia alaternoides (Brongn. & Gris) N.Snow – New Caledonia (Balade)
- Gossia angustifolia N.Snow
- Gossia aphthosa (Vieill. ex Brongn. & Gris) N.Snow
  - Gossia aphthosa subsp. aphthosa – east-northeastern and central New Caledonia
  - Gossia aphthosa subsp. austro-orientalis N.Snow & Gandhi – southeastern New Caledonia
  - Gossia aphthosa subsp. longipedunculata N.Snow & Munzinger
- Gossia bourailensis N.Snow
- Gossia clusioides (Brongn. & Gris) N.Snow
  - Gossia clusioides subsp. avanguiensis N.Snow
  - Gossia clusioides subsp. bleuensis N.Snow
  - Gossia clusioides subsp. callmanderiana N.Snow
  - Gossia clusioides subsp. clusioides – central and southern New Caledonia
  - Gossia clusioides subsp. maoyana N.Snow
  - Gossia clusioides subsp. ploumensis (Däniker) N.Snow – central and southern New Caledonia
  - Gossia clusioides subsp. rembaiensis N.Snow
  - Gossia clusioides subsp. taomensis N.Snow
  - Gossia clusioides subsp. tiebaghiensis N.Snow
- Gossia colnettiana (Guillaumin) N.Snow – northeastern New Caledonia
- Gossia conduplicata N.Snow
- Gossia conspicua (Vieill. ex Guillaumin) N.Snow - north-central and southern New Caledonia
- Gossia diversifolia (Brongn. & Gris) N.Snow - western and southwestern New Caledonia
- Gossia kaalaensis N.Snow
- Gossia katepahiensis N.Snow
- Gossia kuakuensis (Baker f.) N.Snow - northern and southeastern New Caledonia
- Gossia mandjeliaensis N.Snow
- Gossia ngaensis N.Snow
- Gossia nigripes (Guillaumin) N.Snow - northeastern and south-central New Caledonia
- Gossia ouazangouensis N.Snow
- Gossia pancheri (Brongn. & Gris) N.Snow
- Gossia ramiflora N.Snow
- Gossia virotii (Guillaumin) N.Snow - south-central New Caledonia
- Kanakomyrtus N.Snow
  - Kanakomyrtus dawsoniana N.Snow – north-central New Caledonia
  - Kanakomyrtus longipetiolata N.Snow – northern New Caledonia
  - Kanakomyrtus mcphersonii N.Snow – northern and central New Caledonia
  - Kanakomyrtus myrtopsidoides (Guillaumin) N.Snow – southeastern New Caledonia
  - Kanakomyrtus prominens N.Snow – central New Caledonia
  - Kanakomyrtus revoluta N.Snow – northern New Caledonia
- Melaleuca brevisepala (J.W.Dawson) Craven & J.W.Dawson – west-northwestern New Caledonia
- Melaleuca brongniartii Däniker – southeastern New Caledonia
- Melaleuca buseana (Guillaumin) Craven & J.W.Dawson – southeastern New Caledonia
- Melaleuca dawsonii Craven – southeastern New Caledonia
- Melaleuca gnidioides Brongn. & Gris – southeastern New Caledonia
- Melaleuca pancheri (Brongn. & Gris) Craven & J.W.Dawson – southeastern New Caledonia
- Melaleuca sphaerodendra Craven & J.W.Dawson
  - Melaleuca sphaerodendra var. microphylla (Virot) Craven & J.W.Dawson – northwestern and west-central New Caledonia
  - Melaleuca sphaerodendra var. sphaerodendra
- Metrosideros brevistylis J.W.Dawson
- Metrosideros cacuminum J.W.Dawson – northeastern and central New Caledonia
- Metrosideros cherrieri J.W.Dawson – northeastern New Caledonia
- Metrosideros dolichandra Schltr. ex Guillaumin – southeastern New Caledonia
- Metrosideros elegans (Montrouz.) Beauvis.
- Metrosideros engleriana Schltr.
- Metrosideros humboldtiana Guillaumin – southeastern New Caledonia
- Metrosideros laurifolia Brongn. & Gris
- Metrosideros longipetiolata J.W.Dawson – northeastern New Caledonia
- Metrosideros microphylla (Schltr.) J.W.Dawson – southeastern New Caledonia
- Metrosideros nitida Brongn. & Gris
- Metrosideros operculata Labill.
  - Metrosideros operculata var. francii J.W.Dawson
  - Metrosideros operculata var. operculata
- Metrosideros oreomyrtus Däniker
- Metrosideros paniensis J.W.Dawson – southeastern New Caledonia
- Metrosideros patens J.W.Dawson – southeastern New Caledonia
- Metrosideros porphyrea Schltr.
- Metrosideros punctata J.W.Dawson
- Metrosideros rotundifolia J.W.Dawson
- Metrosideros rubra (Brongn. & Gris) Baill.
- Metrosideros tardiflora (J.W.Dawson) Pillon – northern New Caledonia
- Metrosideros tetrasticha Guillaumin – southeastern New Caledonia
- Metrosideros whitakeri J.W.Dawson
- Myrtastrum Burret
  - Myrtastrum rufopunctatum (Pancher ex Brongn. & Gris) Burret
- Pleurocalyptus Brongn. & Gris
  - Pleurocalyptus austrocaledonicus (Guillaumin) J.W.Dawson – central New Caledonia
  - Pleurocalyptus pancheri (Brongn. & Gris) J.W.Dawson – central and southeastern New Caledonia
- Purpureostemon Gugerli
  - Purpureostemon ciliatus (J.R.Forst. & G.Forst.) Gugerli – northwestern and central New Caledonia
- Rhodamnia andromedoides Guillaumin
- Rhodomyrtus locellata (Guillaumin) Burret
- Sannantha leratii (Schltr.) Peter G.Wilson – southeastern New Caledonia
- Sannantha pinifolia (Labill.) Peter G.Wilson
- Sannantha procera (J.W.Dawson) Peter G.Wilson – northwestern New Caledonia
- Sannantha virgata (J.R.Forst. & G.Forst.) Peter G.Wilson
- Syzygium acre (Pancher ex Guillaumin) J.W.Dawson
- Syzygium aggregatum J.W.Dawson
- Syzygium amieuense (Guillaumin) J.W.Dawson – northwestern and central New Caledonia
- Syzygium aoupinianum J.W.Dawson – west-central New Caledonia
- Syzygium apetiolatum J.W.Dawson – central New Caledonia
- Syzygium arboreum (Baker f.) J.W.Dawson
- Syzygium auriculatum Brongn. & Gris – northwestern and central New Caledonia
- Syzygium austrocaledonicum (Seem.) Guillaumin
- Syzygium baladense (Brongn. & Gris) J.W.Dawson
- Syzygium balansae (Guillaumin) J.W.Dawson
- Syzygium baudouinii (Brongn. & Gris) N.Snow, Byng & J.W.Dawson
- Syzygium boulindaense J.W.Dawson – west-central New Caledonia (Mt. Boulinda)
- Syzygium brachycalyx (Baker f.) J.W.Dawson – west.central and central New Caledonia
- Syzygium brevioperculatum J.W.Dawson – central New Caledonia
- Syzygium brevipes (Brongn. & Gris) J.W.Dawson – northwestern New Caledonia
- Syzygium brongniartii (Merr. & L.M.Perry) J.W.Dawson
- Syzygium bullatum (Brongn. & Gris) N.Snow & Byng
- Syzygium capillaceum (Brongn. & Gris) J.W.Dawson
- Syzygium coccineum J.W.Dawson – central and southeastern New Caledonia
- Syzygium conceptionis Guillaumin – west-central and southeastern New Caledonia
- Syzygium dawsonianum N.Snow
- Syzygium deplanchei (Guillaumin) J.W.Dawson – New Caledonia (incl. Î. des Pins)
- Syzygium elegans (Brongn. & Gris) J.W.Dawson – northwestern New Caledonia
- Syzygium filiflorum J.W.Dawson – northern and northwestern New Caledonia
- Syzygium francii (Guillaumin) N.Snow, Byng & Munzinger
- Syzygium frutescens Brongn. & Gris
- Syzygium guillauminii J.W.Dawson
- Syzygium ignambiense (Baker f.) N.Snow & Byng
- Syzygium jaffrei J.W.Dawson – central New Caledonia
- Syzygium koghianum Petitm. & Bonati – New Caledonia (incl. Loyalty Islands)
- Syzygium koniamboense J.W.Dawson – northwestern and west-central New Caledonia
- Syzygium koumacense J.W.Dawson – northwestern New Caledonia
- Syzygium kriegeri (Guillaumin) J.W.Dawson – northwestern and west-central New Caledonia
- Syzygium kuebiniense J.W.Dawson – southeastern New Caledonia
- Syzygium lateriflorum Brongn. & Gris
- Syzygium laxeracemosum (Guillaumin) J.W.Dawson – southeastern New Caledonia
- Syzygium lecardii Guillaumin
- Syzygium lifuanum Däniker – New Caledonia (incl. Loyalty Islands)
- Syzygium longifolium (Brongn. & Gris) J.W.Dawson
- Syzygium macranthum Brongn. & Gris – New Caledonia (incl. Î. des Pins)
- Syzygium meorianum J.W.Dawson, – central New Caledonia
- Syzygium micans Brongn. & Gris
- Syzygium mouanum Guillaumin
- Syzygium multipetalum Pancher ex Brongn. & Gris – east-central and southeastern New Caledonia
- Syzygium nanum J.W.Dawson – southeastern New Caledonia
- Syzygium neocaledonicum (Seem.) J.W.Dawson – northwestern and west-central New Caledonia
- Syzygium neoeugenioides N.Snow
- Syzygium neolaurifolium N.Snow & Byng
- Syzygium ngoyense (Schltr.) Guillaumin – southeastern New Caledonia
- Syzygium nitens J.W.Dawson – southeastern New Caledonia
- Syzygium pancheri Brongn. & Gris
- Syzygium paniense (Baker f.) J.W.Dawson – northwestern and west-central New Caledonia
- Syzygium parvicarpum J.W.Dawson – east-central New Caledonia
- Syzygium pendulinum J.W.Dawson – central and southeastern New Caledonia
- Syzygium pennelii (Guillaumin) J.W.Dawson – central and west-central New Caledonia
- Syzygium poyanum J.W.Dawson – central New Caledonia
- Syzygium propinquum (Guillaumin) J.W.Dawson – central New Caledonia
- Syzygium pseudomalaccense (Vieill. ex Brongn. & Gris) Govaerts
- Syzygium pseudopinnatum Däniker – southeastern New Caledonia (incl. Loyalty Islands)
- Syzygium pterocalyx Brongn. & Gris
- Syzygium pterocarpum (Vieill. ex Pancher & Sebert) Govaerts
- Syzygium quadrangulare Guillaumin
  - Syzygium quadrangulare var. microsemmifolium (Guillaumin) J.W.Dawson
  - Syzygium quadrangulare var. quadrangulare
- Syzygium ramilepis J.W.Dawson – central New Caledonia
- Syzygium rhopalanthum Schltr.
- Syzygium rivulare Vieill. ex Guillaumin – west-central New Caledonia
- Syzygium sarmentosum J.W.Dawson – northwestern New Caledonia
- Syzygium schistaceum J.W.Dawson
- Syzygium schlechterianum Hochr. – northwestern and south-central New Caledonia
- Syzygium tchambaense J.W.Dawson – west-central New Caledonia
- Syzygium tenuiflorum Brongn. & Gris
- Syzygium toninense (Baker f.) J.W.Dawson – northwest and central New Caledonia
- Syzygium tontoutaense J.W.Dawson – southeastern New Caledonia
- Syzygium tripetalum Guillaumin
- Syzygium veillonii J.W.Dawson – central New Caledonia
- Syzygium verrucosum Däniker – New Caledonia (Loyalty Islands)
- Syzygium vieillardii N.Snow, Callm. & Byng
- Syzygium viriosum Craven & J.W.Dawson
- Syzygium virotii J.W.Dawson – southeastern New Caledonia
- Syzygium wagapense Brongn. & Gris
- Syzygium xanthostemifolium (Guillaumin) J.W.Dawson – southeastern New Caledonia
- Tristaniopsis callobuxus Brongn. & Gris
- Tristaniopsis capitulata Brongn. & Gris – central and southeastern New Caledonia
- Tristaniopsis glauca Brongn. & Gris – southeastern New Caledonia
- Tristaniopsis guillainii Vieill. ex Brongn. & Gris
  - Tristaniopsis guillainii var. balansana (Tison) J.W.Dawson – southeastern New Caledonia
  - Tristaniopsis guillainii var. guillainii
- Tristaniopsis jaffrei J.W.Dawson – northwestern New Caledonia
- Tristaniopsis lucida J.W.Dawson – southeastern New Caledonia
- Tristaniopsis macphersonii J.W.Dawson – central and southeastern New Caledonia
- Tristaniopsis minutiflora J.W.Dawson – northwestern New Caledonia
- Tristaniopsis ninndoensis J.W.Dawson – northwestern New Caledonia
- Tristaniopsis planidisca Lannuzel
- Tristaniopsis polyandra (Guillaumin) Peter G.Wilson & J.T.Waterh. – southeastern New Caledonia
- Tristaniopsis reticulata J.W.Dawson – southeastern New Caledonia
- Tristaniopsis vieillardii Brongn. & Gris – north-central and southeastern New Caledonia
- Tristaniopsis yateensis J.W.Dawson – southeastern New Caledonia
- Uromyrtus artensis (Montrouz.) Burret
- Uromyrtus baumanii (Guillaumin) N.Snow & Guymer
- Uromyrtus billardierei (Seem.) A.J.Scott
- Uromyrtus curvipes (Gand.) Burret
- Uromyrtus emarginata (Pancher ex Baker f.) Burret
- Uromyrtus nekouana (Guillaumin) Burret
- Uromyrtus neomyrtoides Burret
- Uromyrtus ngoyensis (Schltr.) Burret
- Uromyrtus paulotchensis (Guillaumin) Burret
- Uromyrtus sunshinensis (Guillaumin) N.Snow & Guymer
- Uromyrtus supraaxillaris (Guillaumin) Burret
- Uromyrtus thymifolia (Pancher ex Guillaumin) Burret
- Xanthomyrtus hienghenensis Guillaumin
- Xanthomyrtus kanalaensis (Hochr.) N.Snow – New Caledonia (Kanala)
- Xanthostemon aurantiacus (Brongn. & Gris) Schltr. – southeastern New Caledonia
- Xanthostemon carlii J.W.Dawson – west-northwestern New Caledonia
- Xanthostemon ferrugineus J.W.Dawson – south-central New Caledonia
- Xanthostemon francii Guillaumin – southeastern New Caledonia
- Xanthostemon glaucus Pamp. – west-northwestern New Caledonia
- Xanthostemon grandiflorus Gugerli
- Xanthostemon grisii Guillaumin – northeastern and north-central New Caledonia
- Xanthostemon gugerlii Merr. – central and southeastern New Caledonia
- Xanthostemon × intermedius Gugerli (X. aurantiacus × X. myrtifolius) – southeastern New Caledonia
- Xanthostemon lateriflorus Guillaumin – New Caledonia (Î. Art)
- Xanthostemon laurinus (Pamp.) Guillaumin – northwestern and west-central New Caledonia
- Xanthostemon longipes Guillaumin – southeastern New Caledonia
- Xanthostemon macrophyllus Pamp. – east-central New Caledonia
- Xanthostemon multiflorus (Montrouz.) Beauvis.
- Xanthostemon myrtifolius (Brongn. & Gris) Pamp. ex Pampal. – southeastern New Caledonia
- Xanthostemon paabaensis Gugerli
- Xanthostemon pubescens (Brongn. & Gris) Sebert & Pancher
- Xanthostemon retusus Gugerli
- Xanthostemon ruber (Brongn. & Gris) Sebert & Pancher – New Caledonia
- Xanthostemon sebertii Guillaumin – southeastern New Caledonia
- Xanthostemon sulfureus Guillaumin – southeastern New Caledonia
- Xanthostemon velutinus (Gugerli) J.W.Dawson – southeastern New Caledonia
- Xanthostemon vieillardii (Brongn. & Gris) Nied. – New Caledonia

== Nepenthaceae ==
- Nepenthes vieillardii Hook.f.

== Nothofagaceae ==
- Nothofagus aequilateralis (Baum.-Bod.) Steenis
- Nothofagus balansae (Baill.) Steenis
- Nothofagus baumanniae (Baum.-Bod.) Steenis – New Caledonia (Mt. Mou)
- Nothofagus codonandra (Baill.) Steenis
- Nothofagus discoidea (Baum.-Bod.) Steenis

== Nyctaginaceae ==
- Ceodes artensis (Montrouz.) E.F.S.Rossetto & Caraballo
- Ceodes gigantocarpa (Heimerl) E.F.S.Rossetto & Caraballo

== Olacaceae ==
- Olax hypoleuca Baill.
  - Olax hypoleuca var. hypoleuca
  - Olax hypoleuca var. microphylla

== Oleaceae ==
- Chionanthus pedunculatus P.S.Green
- Jasminum artense Montrouz.
- Jasminum elatum Pancher ex Guillaumin – central and southern New Caledonia
- Jasminum kriegeri Guillaumin – west-central New Caledonia
- Jasminum mackeeorum P.S.Green
- Jasminum neocaledonicum Schltr.
- Jasminum noumeense Schltr. – southern New Caledonia
- Jasminum promunturianum Däniker – northwestern New Caledonia (Î. Belep)
- Jasminum simplicifolium subsp. leratii (Schltr.) P.S.Green
- Notelaea austrocaledonica Vieill.
  - Notelaea austrocaledonica subsp. austrocaledonica
  - Notelaea austrocaledonica var. badula (Vieill. ex Pancher & Sebert) Pillon & J.Dupin – southeastern New Caledonia
  - Notelaea austrocaledonica var. collina (Schltr.) Pillon & J.Dupin
- Notelaea crassifolia (Guillaumin) Pillon & J.Dupin
- Notelaea cymosa Guillaumin – northwestern and central New Caledonia
- Notelaea monticola Schltr. – central and southeastern New Caledonia

== Oncothecaceae ==
- Oncotheca Baill.
  - Oncotheca balansae Baill. – northern and southeastern New Caledonia
  - Oncotheca humboldtiana (Guillaumin) Morat & Veillon – west-central and southeastern New Caledonia

== Orchidaceae ==
- Achlydosa M.A.Clem. & D.L.Jones
  - Achlydosa glandulosa (Schltr.) M.A.Clem. & D.L.Jones
- Bulbophyllum baladeanum J.J.Sm.
- Bulbophyllum comptonii Rendle
- Bulbophyllum corythium N.Hallé
- Bulbophyllum keekee N.Hallé – south-central New Caledonia
- Bulbophyllum lingulatum Rendle
  - Bulbophyllum lingulatum f. lingulatum
  - Bulbophyllum lingulatum f. microphyton (Guillaumin) N.Hallé
- Bulbophyllum lophoglottis (Guillaumin) N.Hallé – southeastern New Caledonia (Mt. Ouin)
- Bulbophyllum ngoyense Schltr.
- Calanthe balansae Finet
- Calanthe × oreadum Rendle (C. balansae × C. hololeuca)
- Calanthe × villegentei M.Pignal (C. balansae × C. ventilabrum) – northern New Caledonia
- Calochilus neocaledonicus Schltr. – central and southeastern New Caledonia
- Ceratostylis micrantha Schltr.
- Clematepistephium N.Hallé
  - Clematepistephium smilacifolium (Rchb.f.) N.Hallé
- Coilochilus Schltr.
  - Coilochilus neocaledonicum Schltr. – central and eastern New Caledonia
- Corybas echinulus E.Faria
- Corybas × halleanus E.Faria (C. echinulus × C. pignalii)
- Corybas pignalii E.Faria
- Dendrobium amiceanum M.Pignal & Laud.
- Dendrobium arthrobulbum Kraenzl.
- Dendrobium begaudii (Cavestro) Schuit. & Peter B.Adams
- Dendrobium butinii M.Pignal & Munzinger
- Dendrobium camaridiorum Rchb.f.
- Dendrobium casuarinae Schltr.
- Dendrobium cleistogamum Schltr. – southeastern New Caledonia
- Dendrobium closterium Rchb.f.
  - Dendrobium closterium var. closterium
  - Dendrobium closterium var. jocosum (Rchb.f.) N.Hallé
- Dendrobium crassicaule Schltr. – southeastern New Caledonia
- Dendrobium cymatoleguum Schltr. – southeastern New Caledonia
- Dendrobium daenikerianum Kraenzl.
- Dendrobium dangioanum M.Pignal
- Dendrobium deplanchei Rchb.f.
- Dendrobium finetianum Schltr.
- Dendrobium fractiflexum Finet – east-central and southeastern New Caledonia
  - Dendrobium fractiflexum var. fractiflexum – east-central and southeastern New Caledonia
  - Dendrobium fractiflexum var. micranthum Guillaumin
- Dendrobium kanakorum Kraenzl.
- Dendrobium laudereavorum M.Pignal
- Dendrobium letocartiorum Munzinger & M.Pignal
- Dendrobium munificum (Finet) Schltr. – southeastern New Caledonia
- Dendrobium muricatum Finet
- Dendrobium ngoyense Schltr.
- Dendrobium oppositifolium (Kraenzl.) N.Hallé
- Dendrobium pectinatum Finet
- Dendrobium petrophilum (Kraenzl.) Garay ex N.Hallé
- Dendrobium poissonianum Schltr. – northwestern and central New Caledonia
- Dendrobium polycladium Rchb.f.
  - Dendrobium polycladium var. atractoglossum N.Hallé
  - Dendrobium polycladium var. polycladium
- Dendrobium sarcochilus Finet
  - Dendrobium sarcochilus var. megalorhizum (Kraenzl.) N.Hallé
  - Dendrobium sarcochilus var. sarcochilus
- Dendrobium steatoglossum Rchb.f.
- Dendrobium vandifolium Finet
- Dendrobium veillonii M.Pignal
- Dendrobium verruciferum Rchb.f. – northwestern and southeastern New Caledonia
- Dendrobium virotii Guillaumin
- Drymoanthus brigittae (N.Hallé) M.A.Clem.
- Drymoanthus florenciae (N.Hallé) M.A.Clem.
- Drymoanthus minimus (Schltr.) Garay
- Drymoanthus neocaledonicus (Rendle) M.A.Clem.
- Earina deplanchei Rchb.f.
- Earina floripecten Kraenzl.
- Eriaxis Rchb.f.
  - Eriaxis rigida Rchb.f.
- Eulophia moratii N.Hallé – New Caledonia (Î. des Pins)
- Genoplesium calopterum (Rchb.f.) D.L.Jones & M.A.Clem.
- Gonatostylis Schltr.
  - Gonatostylis bougainvillei N.Hallé – central New Caledonia
  - Gonatostylis vieillardii (Rchb.f.) Schltr.
- Goodyera suprinii M.Pignal – west-northwestern New Caledonia
- Habenaria insularis Schltr. – northwestern New Caledonia
- Hymenorchis serrulata (N.Hallé) Garay
- Liparis chalandei Finet – west-central and southeastern New Caledonia
- Liparis laxa Schltr.
- Liparis leratii Schltr.
- Liparis phalacrocorax N.Hallé – northwestern and central New Caledonia
- Liparis pulverulenta Guillaumin
- Liparis sula N.Hallé – southeastern New Caledonia
- Liparis zosterops N.Hallé – central and north-central New Caledonia
- Megastylis latilabris (Schltr.) Schltr. – southeastern New Caledonia
- Megastylis latissima (Schltr.) Schltr. – southeastern New Caledonia
- Megastylis montana (Schltr.) Schltr. – northwestern and southeastern New Caledonia
- Megastylis paradoxa (Kraenzl.) N.Hallé – southeastern New Caledonia (Mt. Humboldt)
- Megastylis rara (Schltr.) Schltr. – central and southeastern New Caledonia
- Nervilia multinervis Cavestro
- Oberonia vieillardii (Rchb.f.) M.A.Clem. & D.L.Jones
- Octarrhena saccolabioides (Schltr.) Schltr. – northwestern New Caledonia
- Pachyplectron Schltr.
  - Pachyplectron aphyllum T.Hashim. – southeastern New Caledonia
  - Pachyplectron arifolium Schltr.
- Pachyplectron neocaledonicum Schltr. – northwestern and southeastern New Caledonia
- Phreatia sublata N.Hallé – central and southeastern New Caledonia
- Platylepis scripta (Rchb.f.) M.C.Pace
- Porpax angelinae M.Pignal
- Porpax ceciliae M.Pignal
- Porpax karikouyensis (Schltr.) Schuit., Y.P.Ng & H.A.Pedersen – central and southeastern New Caledonia
- Porpax lydwinae M.Pignal
- Pterostylis bureaviana Schltr.
- Pterostylis longilabia M.Pignal
- Pterostylis repanda (M.A.Clem. & D.L.Jones) J.M.H.Shaw
- Pterostylis splendens D.L.Jones & M.A.Clem.
- Pterostylis tenuicauda Kraenzl.
- Sarcochilus gildasii N.Hallé
- Sarcochilus koghiensis Schltr.
- Sarcochilus rarus Schltr. – northwestern and southeastern New Caledonia
- Sarcochilus thycola (N.Hallé) M.A.Clem.
- Stigmatodactylus aegeridantennatus (N.Hallé) M.A.Clem. & D.L.Jones – northwestern and southeastern New Caledonia
- Stigmatodactylus bracteatus (Rendle) M.A.Clem. & D.L.Jones – southeastern New Caledonia (Mt. Mou)
- Stigmatodactylus confusus (Guillaumin) M.A.Clem. & D.L.Jones
- Stigmatodactylus corniculatus (Rendle) M.A.Clem. & D.L.Jones – northwestern New Caledonia
- Stigmatodactylus cymbalariifolius (F.Muell. & Kraenzl.) M.A.Clem. & D.L.Jones
- Stigmatodactylus elegans (Rchb.f.) M.A.Clem. & D.L.Jones
- Stigmatodactylus grandiflorus (Schltr.) M.A.Clem. & D.L.Jones – central and southeastern New Caledonia
- Stigmatodactylus halleanus (Kores) M.A.Clem. & D.L.Jones – northwestern and southeastern New Caledonia
- Stigmatodactylus heptadactylus (Kraenzl.) M.A.Clem. & D.L.Jones
- Stigmatodactylus macroglossus (Schltr.) M.A.Clem. & D.L.Jones – southeastern New Caledonia
- Stigmatodactylus oxyglossus (Schltr.) M.A.Clem. & D.L.Jones – southeastern New Caledonia
- Stigmatodactylus tenuilabris (Schltr.) M.A.Clem. & D.L.Jones – central and southeastern New Caledonia
- Stigmatodactylus veillonis (N.Hallé) M.A.Clem. & D.L.Jones – southeastern New Caledonia
- Taeniophyllum graptolitum N.Hallé
- Taeniophyllum labatii (M.Pignal & Munzinger) J.M.H.Shaw
- Taeniophyllum oreophilum (Schltr.) Kocyan & Schuit. – central and southeastern New Caledonia
- Taeniophyllum trachypus Schltr. – central and southeastern New Caledonia
- Thelymitra sarasiniana Kraenzl.
- Townsonia atepala (Rchb.f.) M.A.Clem. & D.L.Jones – southeastern New Caledonia
- Zeuxine mamiefoglianiae M.Pignal – northern New Caledonia

== Oxalidaceae ==
- Oxalis balansae Guillaumin
- Oxalis elsae R.Knuth
- Oxalis novae-caledoniae R.Knuth & Schltr.

== Pandanaceae ==
- Freycinetia brevifolia Martelli
- Freycinetia comptonii Rendle
- Freycinetia erythrostigma Solms ex Martelli
- Freycinetia graminifolia Solms
- Freycinetia hydra B.C.Stone
  - Freycinetia hydra subsp. apodistigma Huynh
  - Freycinetia hydra subsp. hydra
- Freycinetia lorifolia Martelli
- Freycinetia modica Huynh
- Freycinetia novocaledonica Warb.
- Freycinetia panica Huynh
- Freycinetia pseudograminifolia Huynh
- Freycinetia spectabilis Solms
- Freycinetia verruculosa Warb.
- Freycinetia vieillardii Martelli
- Pandanus adpressus H.St.John
- Pandanus alticonvexus H.St.John
- Pandanus altissimus (Brongn.) Solms
- Pandanus amnicola H.St.John
- Pandanus anomesos H.St.John
- Pandanus aragoensis (Brongn.) Solms
- Pandanus balansae (Brongn.) Solms
- Pandanus belepensis Callm. & Munzinger
- Pandanus bernardii H.St.John ex Callm.
- Pandanus bilinearis H.St.John
- Pandanus breviendocarpicus H.St.John
- Pandanus brongniartii H.St.John
- Pandanus bryanii H.St.John
- Pandanus cavatus H.St.John
- Pandanus clandestinus B.C.Stone
- Pandanus crenifer H.St.John
- Pandanus daenikeri H.St.John
- Pandanus dasodes H.St.John
- Pandanus decastigma B.C.Stone
- Pandanus decumbens (Brongn.) Solms
- Pandanus fidelis H.St.John
- Pandanus gibberosus H.St.John
- Pandanus globatus H.St.John
- Pandanus gracilialatus H.St.John – New Caledonia (Loyalty Islands)
- Pandanus induratus H.St.John
- Pandanus jaffrei H.St.John
- Pandanus lacuum H.St.John
- Pandanus laticonvexus H.St.John
- Pandanus letocartiorum Callm. & Buerki
- Pandanus lifouensis H.St.John
- Pandanus mareensis H.St.John
- Pandanus mc-keei H.St.John
- Pandanus medialis H.St.John
- Pandanus mesos H.St.John
- Pandanus metaceus H.St.John
- Pandanus noumeaensis H.St.John
- Pandanus oblongus (Brongn.) Balf.f.
- Pandanus ouveaensis H.St.John
- Pandanus pancheri (Brongn.) Balf.f.
- Pandanus pinensis H.St.John
- Pandanus pistikos H.St.John – New Caledonia (Loyalty Islands)
- Pandanus pistos H.St.John – New Caledonia (Loyalty Islands)
- Pandanus planatus H.St.John
- Pandanus recavilapideus H.St.John
- Pandanus recavisaxosus H.St.John
- Pandanus rectus H.St.John
- Pandanus reticulatus Vieill.
- Pandanus semipilaris H.St.John
- Pandanus serpentinicus H.St.John
- Pandanus sphaerocephalus Pancher ex Brongn.
- Pandanus spheniskos H.St.John
- Pandanus spissus H.St.John
- Pandanus stipiformis H.St.John
- Pandanus subcylindricus H.St.John
- Pandanus taluucensis Callm. – New Caledonia (Mt. Panié)
- Pandanus veillonii H.St.John
- Pandanus verecundus B.C.Stone
- Pandanus verticalis H.St.John
- Pandanus viscidus Pancher ex Brongn.
- Pandanus yandeensis H.St.John
- Pandanus yoshioi H.St.John – New Caledonia (Loyalty Islands)

== Paracryphiaceae ==
- Paracryphia Baker f.
  - Paracryphia alticola (Schltr.) Steenis
- Quintinia hyehenensis Pillon & Hequet
- Quintinia major (Baill.) Schltr.
- Quintinia minor (Baill.) Schltr.
- Quintinia oreophila (Schltr.) Schltr.
- Quintinia sessiliflora Pillon & Hequet
- Sphenostemon balansae Baill. – central New Caledonia
- Sphenostemon comptonii Baker f. – northern New Caledonia
- Sphenostemon oppositifolius Hürl. – New Caledonia
- Sphenostemon pachycladus Baill.
- Sphenostemon thibaudii Jérémie – northern New Caledonia (Mt. Panié)
- Sphenostemon tireliae Jérémie – west-central and southeastern New Caledonia

== Phellinaceae ==
- Phelline Labill.
  - Phelline barrierei Barriera & Schlüssel – New Caledonia
  - Phelline billardierei Pancher ex Loes.
  - Phelline brachyphylla Baill. – central New Caledonia
  - Phelline comosa Labill.
  - Phelline dumbeensis Guillaumin
  - Phelline erubescens Baill.
  - Phelline gracilior (Loes.) Barriera – northwestern and west-northwestern New Caledonia
  - Phelline indivisa (Baill.) Harms & Loes. – central and southern New Caledonia
  - Phelline lucida Vieill. ex Baill.
  - Phelline macrophylla Baill.

== Phyllanthaceae ==
- Antidesma messianianum Guillaumin – central New Caledonia
- Cleistanthus stipitatus (Baill.) Müll.Arg.
- Phyllanthus aeneus Baill.
  - Phyllanthus aeneus var. aeneus
  - Phyllanthus aeneus var. cordifolius – southeastern New Caledonia (Yaté-Ounia Reg.)
  - Phyllanthus aeneus var. longistylis M.Schmid – southeastern New Caledonia
  - Phyllanthus aeneus var. nepouiensis M.Schmid – New Caledonia (Népoui Pen.)
  - Phyllanthus aeneus var. papillosus M.Schmid – New Caledonia (Mt. Koniambo)
- Phyllanthus amieuensis Guillaumin – New Caledonia (Col d'Amieu)
- Phyllanthus aoupinieensis M.Schmid – New Caledonia (Massif de l'Aoupinié)
- Phyllanthus artensis M.Schmid – New Caledonia (N. Ile Art)
- Phyllanthus avanguiensis M.Schmid – New Caledonia (Mt. Boulinda)
- Phyllanthus baladensis Baill. – northwestern and central New Caledonia
- Phyllanthus balansanus Guillaumin – New Caledonia
- Phyllanthus baraouaensis M.Schmid – New Caledonia (W. Mé Maoya)
- Phyllanthus billardierei (Baill.) Müll.Arg. – New Caledonia (incl. Loyalty Islands)
- Phyllanthus boguenensis M.Schmid – central New Caledonia
- Phyllanthus bupleuroides Baill.
  - Phyllanthus bupleuroides var. bupleuroides – New Caledonia (Canala Reg.)
  - Phyllanthus bupleuroides var. latiaxialis M.Schmid – New Caledonia (Thio to Poindimié)
  - Phyllanthus bupleuroides var. meoriensis M.Schmid – New Caledonia (Mt. Ori)
  - Phyllanthus bupleuroides var. ngoyensis (Schltr.) M.Schmid – east-central and southeastern New Caledonia
  - Phyllanthus bupleuroides var. poroensis M.Schmid – New Caledonia (Canala to Houaïlou)
- Phyllanthus buxoides Guillaumin – northwestern New Caledonia
- Phyllanthus calcicola M.Schmid – northwestern New Caledonia
- Phyllanthus caledonicus (Müll.Arg.) Müll.Arg. – New Caledonia (incl. Î. des Pins, Loyalty Islands)
- Phyllanthus carlottae M.Schmid – southeastern New Caledonia
- Phyllanthus casearioides S.Moore – New Caledonia (Touho Reg.)
- Phyllanthus castus S.Moore – southeastern New Caledonia
- Phyllanthus caudatus Müll.Arg – southeastern New Caledonia
  - Phyllanthus caudatus var. caudatus – southeastern New Caledonia
  - Phyllanthus caudatus var. pubescens M.Schmid – southeastern New Caledonia
- Phyllanthus chamaecerasus Baill.
  - Phyllanthus chamaecerasus var. aoupinieensis M.Schmid – New Caledonia (Houaïlou Reg.)
  - Phyllanthus chamaecerasus var. chamaecerasus – northwestern New Caledonia (Balade)
  - Phyllanthus chamaecerasus var. intermedius M.Schmid – central and southern New Caledonia
  - Phyllanthus chamaecerasus var. longipedicellatus M.Schmid – New Caledonia (Bourail Reg.)
  - Phyllanthus chamaecerasus var. meoriensis M.Schmid – south-central New Caledonia
  - Phyllanthus chamaecerasus f. ripicola (Guillaumin) M.Schmid – southern New Caledonia
  - Phyllanthus chamaecerasus var. vieillardii (Baill.) M.Schmid – south-central New Caledonia
- Phyllanthus cherrieri M.Schmid – New Caledonia (Mt. Arago)
- Phyllanthus chrysanthus Baill.
  - Phyllanthus chrysanthus var. chrysanthus
  - Phyllanthus chrysanthus var. deverdensis M.Schmid – New Caledonia (Cap Deverd)
  - Phyllanthus chrysanthus var. micrantheoides (Baill.) M.Schmid
- Phyllanthus comptonii S.Moore – northern New Caledonia
- Phyllanthus conjugatus M.Schmid
  - Phyllanthus conjugatus var. conjugatus – New Caledonia (Vallée de la Kalouehola)
  - Phyllanthus conjugatus var. ducosensis M.Schmid – New Caledonia (Ducos Pen.)
  - Phyllanthus conjugatus var. maaensis M.Schmid – New Caledonia (Mt. Maa)
- Phyllanthus cornutus Baill. – New Caledonia (incl. Î. des Pins)
- Phyllanthus deciduiramus Däniker – New Caledonia (Mt. Kaala)
- Phyllanthus deplanchei Müll.Arg. – New Caledonia (incl. Î. des Pins)
- Phyllanthus dorotheae M.Schmid – central and east-central New Caledonia
- Phyllanthus dracunculoides Baill.
  - Phyllanthus dracunculoides var. amieuensis M.Schmid – central New Caledonia
  - Phyllanthus dracunculoides var. dracunculoides – northwestern New Caledonia
  - Phyllanthus dracunculoides var. tiwakaensis M.Schmid – northwestern New Caledonia
- Phyllanthus dumbeaensis M.Schmid – New Caledonia (Dumbéa-Couvelée)
- Phyllanthus dzumacensis M.Schmid – New Caledonia (Dzumac Mts.)
- Phyllanthus faguetii Boiv. ex Baill.
  - Phyllanthus faguetii var. brevipedicellatus M.Schmid – north-central New Caledonia (Touho)
  - Phyllanthus faguetii var. faguetii – western and southern New Caledonia
  - Phyllanthus faguetii var. gracilipedicellatus M.Schmid – north-central New Caledonia (Touho)
  - Phyllanthus faguetii var. lifuensis (Guillaumin) M.Schmid – northwestern and north-central New Caledonia
  - Phyllanthus faguetii var. rhombifolius M.Schmid – New Caledonia (Poindimié-Tuoho Reg.)
- Phyllanthus favieri M.Schmid
  - Phyllanthus favieri var. favieri – New Caledonia (Koniambo)
  - Phyllanthus favieri var. kaalaensis M.Schmid – New Caledonia (Mt. Kaala)
- Phyllanthus fractiflexus M.Schmid – New Caledonia (Mt. Koniambo)
- Phyllanthus francii Guillaumin – southern New Caledonia
- Phyllanthus gneissicus S.Moore
  - Phyllanthus gneissicus var. broumoiriensis M.Schmid – New Caledonia (Mé Broumoiri)
  - Phyllanthus gneissicus var. gneissicus – northwestern New Caledonia
  - Phyllanthus gneissicus var. ramosus M.Schmid – New Caledonia (Ponérihouen to Touho)
  - Phyllanthus gneissicus var. toninensis (S.Moore) M.Schmid – northwestern New Caledonia
- Phyllanthus golonensis M.Schmid – New Caledonia (Golone)
- Phyllanthus guillauminii Däniker – New Caledonia (Tiébaghi Mts.)
- Phyllanthus helenae M.Schmid – central New Caledonia
- Phyllanthus houailouensis M.Schmid – central New Caledonia (Houaïlou)
- Phyllanthus jaffrei M.Schmid – central New Caledonia
- Phyllanthus jaubertii Vieill. ex Guillaumin
  - Phyllanthus jaubertii var. brachypoda Guillaumin – New Caledonia (Canala)
  - Phyllanthus jaubertii var. jaubertii – New Caledonia (Poindimié-Tuoho Reg.)
- Phyllanthus kanalensis Baill.
- Phyllanthus koghiensis Guillaumin – southeastern New Caledonia (Massif des Koghis)
- Phyllanthus koniamboensis M.Schmid
  - Phyllanthus koniamboensis var. koniamboensis – northwestern New Caledonia
  - Phyllanthus koniamboensis var. taomensis M.Schmid – New Caledonia (Massif du Taom)
- Phyllanthus kouaouaensis M.Schmid – central New Caledonia
- Phyllanthus koumacensis Guillaumin – northwestern New Caledonia
  - Phyllanthus koumacensis var. brevitepalus M.Schmid – northwestern New Caledonia
  - Phyllanthus koumacensis var. koumacensis – northwestern New Caledonia (Tiébaghi)
- Phyllanthus ligustrifolius S.Moore
  - Phyllanthus ligustrifolius var. boulindaensis M.Schmid – west-central New Caledonia
  - Phyllanthus ligustrifolius var. colnettensis M.Schmid – central New Caledonia
  - Phyllanthus ligustrifolius var. ligustrifolius – northwestern New Caledonia
- Phyllanthus longeramosus Guillaumin – New Caledonia (Dumbéa-Païta Reg.)
- Phyllanthus loranthoides Baill.
  - Phyllanthus loranthoides var. longifolius M.Schmid – northwestern New Caledonia
  - Phyllanthus loranthoides var. loranthoides – northwestern New Caledonia
  - Phyllanthus loranthoides var. ripicola M.Schmid – northwestern and central New Caledonia
- Phyllanthus luciliae M.Schmid – New Caledonia (Cap Bocage)
- Phyllanthus macrochorion Baill. – northwestern New Caledonia
- Phyllanthus macrophyllus (Labill.) Müll.Arg.
- Phyllanthus mandjeliaensis M.Schmid – northwestern New Caledonia
- Phyllanthus mangenotii M.Schmid – central New Caledonia (Monéo Reg.)
- Phyllanthus margaretiae M.Schmid – central New Caledonia (Mt. Aoupinié)
- Phyllanthus mcphersonii M.Schmid – New Caledonia (Ouaco)
- Phyllanthus memaoyaensis M.Schmid – central New Caledonia
- Phyllanthus meuieensis M.Schmid – New Caledonia (Mé Ouié)
- Phyllanthus montis-fontium M.Schmid – southeastern New Caledonia
- Phyllanthus montrouzieri Guillaumin – northwestern and west-central New Caledonia
  - Phyllanthus montrouzieri var. montrouzieri – northwestern and west-central New Caledonia
  - Phyllanthus montrouzieri var. pandopensis M.Schmid – northwestern New Caledonia (S. of Koumac)
  - Phyllanthus montrouzieri var. poyaensis M.Schmid – west-central New Caledonia (Massif du Boulinda)
- Phyllanthus moorei M.Schmid
  - Phyllanthus moorei var. acutitepalus M.Schmid
  - Phyllanthus moorei var. moorei
- Phyllanthus moratii M.Schmid – northwestern New Caledonia (Tiwaka-Amoa Reg.)
- Phyllanthus mouensis M.Schmid – southeastern New Caledonia
- Phyllanthus natoensis M.Schmid – New Caledonia (Ponérihouen Reg.)
- Phyllanthus ningaensis M.Schmid – New Caledonia (Mt. Ninga)
- Phyllanthus nitens M.Schmid – New Caledonia (Massif du Boulinda)
- Phyllanthus nothisii M.Schmid – west-central New Caledonia
  - Phyllanthus nothisii var. alticola M.Schmid – west-central New Caledonia (Mt. Boulinda, Mt. Paéoua: above 1000 m )
  - Phyllanthus nothisii var. nothisii – west-central New Caledonia (Mt. Boulinda)
- Phyllanthus ouveanus Däniker – New Caledonia (Loyalty Islands)
- Phyllanthus pancherianus Baill.
  - Phyllanthus pancherianus var. kopetoensis M.Schmid – north-central New Caledonia (Mt. Kopéto)
  - Phyllanthus pancherianus var. memaoyaensis M.Schmid – central New Caledonia (S. of Mé Maoya)
  - Phyllanthus pancherianus var. nakadaensis M.Schmid – southeast central New Caledonia (Mt. Nakada)
  - Phyllanthus pancherianus var. pancherianus – central New Caledonia
- Phyllanthus parainduratus M.Schmid – east-central and west-central New Caledonia
- Phyllanthus parangoyensis M.Schmid – New Caledonia (Canala)
- Phyllanthus paucitepalus M.Schmid – New Caledonia (Col de Mô)
- Phyllanthus peltatus Guillaumin – northwestern New Caledonia
- Phyllanthus petchikaraensis M.Schmid – New Caledonia (Col de Petchikara)
- Phyllanthus pilifer M.Schmid
  - Phyllanthus pilifer var. grandieensis M.Schmid – New Caledonia (Mt. Grandié)
  - Phyllanthus pilifer var. pilifer – central New Caledonia
- Phyllanthus pindaiensis M.Schmid – west-central New Caledonia (Népoui Pen.)
- Phyllanthus pinjenensis M.Schmid – northwestern New Caledonia (near Koné)
- Phyllanthus platycalyx Müll.Arg.
  - Phyllanthus platycalyx var. angustifolius Guillaumin – New Caledonia (Tiwaka)
  - Phyllanthus platycalyx var. platycalyx – northwestern and north-central New Caledonia
- Phyllanthus polygynus M.Schmid – northwestern New Caledonia
- Phyllanthus poueboensis M.Schmid – northwestern New Caledonia (Pouébo Reg.)
- Phyllanthus poumensis Guillaumin – northwestern New Caledonia
  - Phyllanthus poumensis var. longistylis M.Schmid – northwestern New Caledonia
  - Phyllanthus poumensis var. longitepalus M.Schmid – northwestern New Caledonia
  - Phyllanthus poumensis var. poumensis – northwestern New Caledonia
- Phyllanthus pronyensis Guillaumin – southeastern New Caledonia
- Phyllanthus pseudotrichopodus M.Schmid – east-central New Caledonia (Houaïlou to Touho)
- Phyllanthus pterocladus S.Moore – northwestern New Caledonia
- Phyllanthus quintuplinervis M.Schmid – south-central New Caledonia
  - Phyllanthus quintuplinervis var. meoriensis M.Schmid – south-central New Caledonia (Mé Ori)
  - Phyllanthus quintuplinervis var. quintuplinervis – south-central New Caledonia
- Phyllanthus rhodocladus S.Moore – New Caledonia (E. Ignambi)
- Phyllanthus rozennae M.Schmid – New Caledonia (S. Î. Art)
- Phyllanthus salicifolius Baill. – northwestern New Caledonia
- Phyllanthus sarasinii Guillaumin – central New Caledonia
- Phyllanthus serpentinus S.Moore – northwestern New Caledonia
- Phyllanthus stenophyllus Guillaumin – New Caledonia (Poindimié-Tuoho Reg.)
- Phyllanthus stipitatus M.Schmid – north-central New Caledonia (Massif du Boulinda)
- Phyllanthus sylvincola S.Moore – south-central New Caledonia
- Phyllanthus tangoensis M.Schmid, – New Caledonia (Plateau de Tango)
- Phyllanthus tenuipedicellatus M.Schmid
  - Phyllanthus tenuipedicellatus var. kaloueholaensis M.Schmid – New Caledonia (S. of Tontouta)
  - Phyllanthus tenuipedicellatus var. tenuipedicellatus
  - Phyllanthus tenuipedicellatus var. tontoutaensis M.Schmid – New Caledonia (Tontouta)
- Phyllanthus tiebaghiensis M.Schmid – northwestern New Caledonia (Massif de la Tiébaghi)
- Phyllanthus tireliae M.Schmid – New Caledonia (Massif du Boulinda)
- Phyllanthus tixieri M.Schmid – New Caledonia (Kouaoua Reg.)
- Phyllanthus torrentium Müll.Arg.
  - Phyllanthus torrentium var. induratus (S.Moore) M.Schmid – central New Caledonia
  - Phyllanthus torrentium var. torrentium – west-central New Caledonia
- Phyllanthus trichopodus Guillaumin – New Caledonia (Touho Reg.)
- Phyllanthus tritepalus M.Schmid – east-central New Caledonia (Canala)
- Phyllanthus umbricola Guillaumin – southeastern New Caledonia
- Phyllanthus unifoliatus M.Schmid – west-central New Caledonia (Pindai Pen.)
- Phyllanthus unioensis M.Schmid – south-central New Caledonia (Table Unio)
- Phyllanthus veillonii M.Schmid – New Caledonia (S. Î. Art)
- Phyllanthus vespertilio Baill. – New Caledonia (Canala, Col d'Amos)
- Phyllanthus virgultiramus Däniker – northwestern New Caledonia (Masssif du Koniambo)
- Phyllanthus vulcani Guillaumin – east-central and southeastern New Caledonia
  - Phyllanthus vulcani var. baumannii Guillaumin – southeastern New Caledonia
  - Phyllanthus vulcani var. vulcani – east-central and southeastern New Caledonia
- Phyllanthus yaouhensis Schltr. – New Caledonia (Nouméa)
- Phyllanthus yvettae M.Schmid – east-central and southeastern New Caledonia

== Picrodendraceae ==
- Austrobuxus alticola McPherson – northeastern New Caledonia
- Austrobuxus brevipes Airy Shaw – eastern New Caledonia
- Austrobuxus carunculatus (Baill.) Airy Shaw
- Austrobuxus clusiaceus (Baill.) Airy Shaw – New Caledonia (near Païta)
- Austrobuxus cracens McPherson – east-central New Caledonia
- Austrobuxus cuneatus (Airy Shaw) Airy Shaw – southern New Caledonia
- Austrobuxus ellipticus McPherson – central and east-central New Caledonia
- Austrobuxus eugeniifolius (Guillaumin) Airy Shaw
- Austrobuxus huerlimannii Airy Shaw – southeastern New Caledonia
- Austrobuxus mandjelicus McPherson – northern New Caledonia
- Austrobuxus montis-do Airy Shaw – New Caledonia (Mt. Do)
- Austrobuxus ovalis Airy Shaw – northwestern and central New Caledonia
- Austrobuxus pauciflorus Airy Shaw – southeastern New Caledonia
- Austrobuxus rubiginosus (Guillaumin) Airy Shaw – eastern New Caledonia
- Austrobuxus vieillardii (Guillaumin) Airy Shaw – northeastern New Caledonia
- Longetia Baill.
  - Longetia buxoides Baill.
- Scagea McPherson
  - Scagea depauperata (Baill.) McPherson southeastern New Caledonia
  - Scagea oligostemon (Guillaumin) McPherson

== Piperaceae ==
- Peperomia caledonica C.DC.
- Peperomia canalensis C.DC.
- Peperomia lifuana C.DC. – New Caledonia (Loyalty Islands)
- Peperomia sarasinii C.DC. – New Caledonia (Loyalty Islands)
- Peperomia subpallescens C.DC.
- Piper staminodiferum C.DC.

== Pittosporaceae ==
- Pittosporum aliferum Tirel & Veillon – west-central New Caledonia
- Pittosporum artense Guillaumin – New Caledonia (Î. Art)
- Pittosporum baudouinii Brongn. & Gris – southeastern New Caledonia
- Pittosporum bernardii Tirel & Veillon – east-central New Caledonia
- Pittosporum bouletii Veillon & Tirel – west-central New Caledonia (Plateau de Tango)
- Pittosporum brevispinum Veillon & Tirel – west-central New Caledonia
- Pittosporum cherrieri Tirel & Veillon – southern New Caledonia (and Î des Pins)
- Pittosporum coccineum (Montrouz.) Beauvis. – northwestern and west-central New Caledonia
- Pittosporum collinum Guillaumin – western New Caledonia
- Pittosporum croceum Guillaumin – northwestern New Caledonia
- Pittosporum deplanchei Brongn. & Gris – central and southeastern New Caledonia
- Pittosporum dzumacense Guillaumin
- Pittosporum echinatum Brongn. & Gris – northern and northwestern New Caledonia
- Pittosporum gatopense Guillaumin – western New Caledonia
- Pittosporum gracile Pancher ex Brongn. & Gris,
- Pittosporum heckelii Dubard – northern and central New Caledonia
- Pittosporum hematomallum Guillaumin – eastern and southeastern New Caledonia
- Pittosporum kaalense Guillaumin – northwestern and west-central New Caledonia
- Pittosporum koghiense Guillaumin – southeastern New Caledonia
- Pittosporum lanipetalum Tirel & Veillon – northern New Caledonia
- Pittosporum leratii Guillaumin – central and southeastern New Caledonia
- Pittosporum leroyanum Tirel & Veillon – New Caledonia (Î des Pins)
- Pittosporum letocartiorum Veillon & Tirel – central and east-central New Caledonia
- Pittosporum loniceroides Brongn. & Gris – east-central New Caledonia
- Pittosporum mackeei Tirel & Veillon – north-central New Caledonia
- Pittosporum malaxanii Veillon & Tirel – central New Caledonia
- Pittosporum morierei Vieill. ex Guillaumin – central New Caledonia
- Pittosporum muricatum Tirel & Veillon – southeastern New Caledonia
- Pittosporum obovatum Guillaumin – New Caledonia (Loyalty Islands)
- Pittosporum oreophilum Guillaumin
- Pittosporum ornatum Tirel & Veillon – central New Caledonia
- Pittosporum oubatchense Schltr.
- Pittosporum pancheri Brongn. & Gris – south-central and southeastern New Caledonia
- Pittosporum paniculatum Brongn. & Gris – northern and central New Caledonia
- Pittosporum paniense Guillaumin - New Caledonia (Mt. Panié)
- Pittosporum poueboense Guillaumin – northern and central New Caledonia
- Pittosporum poumense Guillaumin – western and central New Caledonia
- Pittosporum pronyense Guillaumin – east-central and southeastern New Caledonia
- Pittosporum scythophyllum Schltr. – eastern and southeastern New Caledonia
- Pittosporum sessilifolium Tirel & Veillon – western and central New Caledonia
- Pittosporum simsonii Montrouz.
- Pittosporum sylvaticum Guillaumin – southern New Caledonia
- Pittosporum tanianum Veillon & Tirel – New Caledonia (Î. Leprédour)
- Pittosporum verrucosum Veillon & Tirel – central New Caledonia
- Pittosporum xanthanthum Schltr. – central and southeastern New Caledonia

== Poaceae ==
- Ancistrachne numaeensis (Balansa) S.T.Blake
- Aristida novae-caledoniae Henrard
- Aristida pilosa Labill.
- Digitaria montana Henrard
- Greslania Balansa
  - Greslania circinata Balansa
  - Greslania rivularis Balansa
- Oryza neocaledonica Morat
- Setaria austrocaledonica (Balansa) A.Camus
- Setaria jaffrei Morat

== Podocarpaceae ==
- Acmopyle pancheri (Brongn. & Gris) Pilg.
- Dacrycarpus vieillardii (Parl.) de Laub.
- Dacrydium araucarioides Brongn. & Gris – southeastern New Caledonia
- Dacrydium balansae Brongn. & Gris
- Dacrydium guillauminii J.Buchholz – New Caledonia (Grand Lac, Lac en Huit, Rivière des Lacs)
- Dacrydium lycopodioides Brongn. & Gris – southeastern New Caledonia
- Dacrydium × suprinii Nimsch (D. araucarioides × D. guillauminii) – New Caledonia (Grand Lac, Rivière des Lacs)
- Falcatifolium taxoides (Brongn. & Gris) de Laub.
- Parasitaxus de Laub.
  - Parasitaxus usta (Vieill.) de Laub. – Parasitic on Falcatifolium taxoides
- Pectinopitys ferruginoides (Compton) C.N.Page
- Podocarpus beecherae de Laub. southeastern New Caledonia
- Podocarpus decumbens N.E.Gray –southeastern New Caledonia
- Podocarpus gnidioides Carrière – southeastern New Caledonia
- Podocarpus longifoliolatus Pilg. – southeastern New Caledonia (incl. î. des Pins)
- Podocarpus lucienii de Laub.
- Podocarpus novae-caledoniae Vieill. ex Brongn. & Gris – southeastern New Caledonia (incl. î des Pins)
- Podocarpus polyspermus de Laub. – central New Caledonia
- Podocarpus sylvestris J.Buchholz
- Retrophyllum comptonii (J.Buchholz) C.N.Page
- Retrophyllum minus (Carrière) C.N.Page – New Caledonia

== Polygalaceae ==
- Moutabea pacifica (Morat & Meijden) Byng & Christenh.

== Polypodiaceae ==
- Arthropteris neocaledonica Copel.
- Elaphoglossum glabratum (Mett.) T.Moore
- Elaphoglossum hurlimannii Guillaumin
- Elaphoglossum vieillardii (Mett.) T.Moore
- Grammitis deplanchei (Baker) Copel.
- Grammitis neocaledonica Copel.
- Grammitis pseudaustralis E.Fourn.
- Lastreopsis abscondita Perrie & Amice
- Lastreopsis subsericea (Mett.) Tindale
- Lastreopsis vieillardii (Mett.) Tindale
- Lecanopteris latilobata (Hennipman & Hett.) Perrie & Brownsey
- Lecanopteris varians (Mett.) Perrie & Brownsey
- Lecanopteris vieillardii (Mett.) Perrie & Brownsey
- Lomariopsis novae-caledoniae Mett.
- Selliguea lanceola (Mett.) E.Fourn.
- Tectaria kouniensis Brownlie
- Tectaria lifuensis (E.Fourn.) C.Chr. – New Caledonia (Loyalty Islands)
- Tectaria moorei (Hook.) C.Chr.
- Tectaria seemannii (E.Fourn.) Copel.
- Tectaria vieillardii (E.Fourn.) C.Chr.

== Primulaceae ==
- Maesa jaffrei M.Schmid
- Maesa novocaledonica Mez
- Mangenotiella M.Schmid
  - Mangenotiella stellata M.Schmid
- Myrsine albiflorens (M.Schmid) Ricketson & Pipoly
- Myrsine arborea (M.Schmid) Ricketson & Pipoly
- Myrsine asymmetrica (Mez) Ricketson & Pipoly
  - Myrsine asymmetrica subsp. asymmetrica
  - Myrsine asymmetrica subsp. magnifolia (M.Schmid) Ricketson & Pipoly
  - Myrsine asymmetrica subsp. paniensis (M.Schmid) Ricketson & Pipoly
  - Myrsine asymmetrica subsp. parvifolia (M.Schmid) Ricketson & Pipoly
- Myrsine belepensis (M.Schmid) Ricketson & Pipoly
- Myrsine boulindaensis (M.Schmid) Ricketson & Pipoly
- Myrsine citrifolia (Mez) Ricketson & Pipoly
- Myrsine diminuta (Mez) Ricketson & Pipoly
- Myrsine discocarpa (M.Schmid) Ricketson & Pipoly
- Myrsine dumbeaensis (M.Schmid) Ricketson & Pipoly
- Myrsine grandifolia (S.Moore) Ricketson & Pipoly
- Myrsine humboldtensis (M.Schmid) Ricketson & Pipoly
- Myrsine katrikouensis (M.Schmidt) Ricketson & Pipoly
- Myrsine koghiensis (M.Schmid) Ricketson & Pipoly
- Myrsine kuebiniensis (M.Schmid) Ricketson & Pipoly
- Myrsine lanceolata Pancher & Sebert
  - Myrsine lanceolata subsp. lanceolata
  - Myrsine lanceolata subsp. ouenarouensis (M.Schmid) Ricketson & Pipoly
- Myrsine macrophylla (Mez) Pancher & Sebert ex Prain
  - Myrsine macrophylla subsp. macrophylla
  - Myrsine macrophylla subsp. menaziensis (M.Schmid) Ricketson & Pipoly
- Myrsine mcphersonii (M.Schmid) Ricketson & Pipoly
- Myrsine memaoyaensis (M.Schmid) Ricketson & Pipoly
- Myrsine modesta subsp. coriaria (M.Schmid) Ricketson & Pipoly
- Myrsine modesta subsp. tiebaghiensis (M.Schmid) Ricketson & Pipoly
- Myrsine munzingeri (M.Schmid) Ricketson & Pipoly
- Myrsine nigricans (M.Schmid) Ricketson & Pipoly
  - Myrsine nigricans subsp. nigricans
  - Myrsine nigricans subsp. ouinensis (M.Schmid) Ricketson & Pipoly
- Myrsine nitens (M.Schmid) Ricketson & Pipoly
- Myrsine novocaledonica (Mez) Ricketson & Pipoly
  - Myrsine novocaledonica subsp. balabioensis (M.Schmid) Ricketson & Pipoly
  - Myrsine novocaledonica subsp. boulindaensis (M.Schmid) Ricketson & Pipoly
  - Myrsine novocaledonica subsp. kaalaensis (M.Schmid) Ricketson & Pipoly
  - Myrsine novocaledonica subsp. mueoensis (M.Schmid) Ricketson & Pipoly
  - Myrsine novocaledonica subsp. novocaledonica
  - Myrsine novocaledonica subsp. piroguensis (M.Schmid) Ricketson & Pipoly
- Myrsine oblanceolata (M.Schmid) Ricketson & Pipoly
  - Myrsine oblanceolata subsp. doensis (M.Schmid) Ricketson & Pipoly
  - Myrsine oblanceolata subsp. oblanceolata
- Myrsine obovalifolia (M.Schmid) Ricketson & Pipoly
- Myrsine ouameniensis (M.Schmid) Ricketson & Pipoly
- Myrsine ouazangouensis (M.Schmid) Ricketson & Pipoly
- Myrsine ovicarpa (M.Schmid) Ricketson & Pipoly
- Myrsine paniensis (M.Schmid) Ricketson & Pipoly
- Myrsine parvicarpa (M.Schmid) Ricketson & Pipoly
  - Myrsine parvicarpa subsp. amossensis (M.Schmid) Ricketson & Pipoly
  - Myrsine parvicarpa subsp. pachyphylla (M.Schmid) Ricketson & Pipoly
  - Myrsine parvicarpa subsp. parvicarpa
- Myrsine poumensis (M.Schmid) Ricketson & Pipoly
- Myrsine pronyensis (Guillaumin) Ricketson & Pipoly
- Myrsine spissifolia (M.Schmid) Ricketson & Pipoly
- Myrsine stenophylla (Mez) Ricketson & Pipoly
- Myrsine taomensis (M.Schmid) Ricketson & Pipoly
- Myrsine tchingouensis (M.Schmid) Ricketson & Pipoly
- Myrsine verrucosa (M.Schmid) Ricketson & Pipoly
  - Myrsine verrucosa subsp. microphylla (M.Schmid) Ricketson & Pipoly
  - Myrsine verrucosa subsp. verrucosa
- Myrsine yateensis (M.Schmid) Ricketson & Pipoly
- Tapeinosperma acutangulum Mez
- Tapeinosperma amieuense M.Schmid
- Tapeinosperma amosense Guillaumin
- Tapeinosperma amplexicaule Mez
- Tapeinosperma aragoense Guillaumin
- Tapeinosperma ateouense M.Schmid
- Tapeinosperma boulindaense M.Schmid
- Tapeinosperma brevipedicellatum M.Schmid
- Tapeinosperma campanula Mez
- Tapeinosperma canalense Guillaumin
- Tapeinosperma clethroides Mez
- Tapeinosperma colnettianum Guillaumin
- Tapeinosperma deflexum Mez
- Tapeinosperma deroini M.Schmid
- Tapeinosperma ellipticum Mez
- Tapeinosperma glandulosum Guillaumin
- Tapeinosperma golonense M.Schmid
- Tapeinosperma gracile Mez
- Tapeinosperma grandiflorum Guillaumin
- Tapeinosperma kaalaense M.Schmid
- Tapeinosperma koghiense Guillaumin
- Tapeinosperma laeve Mez
- Tapeinosperma laurifolium Mez
- Tapeinosperma lecardii Mez
- Tapeinosperma lenormandii Hook.f.
- Tapeinosperma mackeei M.Schmid
- Tapeinosperma minutum Mez
- Tapeinosperma multipunctatum Guillaumin
- Tapeinosperma nectandroides Mez
- Tapeinosperma nitidum Mez
- Tapeinosperma oblongifolium Mez
- Tapeinosperma pancheri Mez
- Tapeinosperma paniense M.Schmid
- Tapeinosperma pauciflorum Mez
- Tapeinosperma pennellii Guillaumin
- Tapeinosperma poueboense M.Schmid
- Tapeinosperma psaladense Mez
  - Tapeinosperma psaladense f. psaladense
  - Tapeinosperma psaladense f. salignum (Mez) M.Schmid
- Tapeinosperma pulchellum Mez
- Tapeinosperma robustum Mez
- Tapeinosperma rubidum Mez
- Tapeinosperma rubriscapum Guillaumin
- Tapeinosperma schlechteri Mez
- Tapeinosperma sessilifolium Mez
  - Tapeinosperma sessilifolium var. calcicola M.Schmid
  - Tapeinosperma sessilifolium var. ouazangouense M.Schmid
  - Tapeinosperma sessilifolium var. sessilifolium
- Tapeinosperma squarrosum Mez
- Tapeinosperma storezii M.Schmid
- Tapeinosperma tchingouense M.Schmid
  - Tapeinosperma tchingouense var. longipetiolatum M.Schmid
  - Tapeinosperma tchingouense var. tchingouense
- Tapeinosperma tenue Mez
- Tapeinosperma veillonii M.Schmid
- Tapeinosperma vestitum Mez
- Tapeinosperma vieillardii Hook.f.
- Tapeinosperma wagapense Mez
- Tapeinosperma whitei Guillaumin

== Proteaceae ==
- Beauprea Brongn. & Gris
  - Beauprea asplenioides Schltr. – southeastern New Caledonia
  - Beauprea balansae Brongn. & Gris – central New Caledonia
  - Beauprea comptonii S.Moore – central and northern New Caledonia
  - Beauprea congesta Virot – New Caledonia (Mt. Humboldt)
  - Beauprea crassifolia Virot – New Caledonia (Roche Ouaième)
  - Beauprea filipes Schltr.
  - Beauprea gracilis Brongn. & Gris
  - Beauprea montana (Brongn. & Gris) Virot – central and southeastern New Caledonia
  - Beauprea montis-fontium Guillaumin – southeastern New Caledonia
  - Beauprea neglecta Virot
  - Beauprea pancheri Brongn. & Gris – central and southeastern New Caledonia
  - Beauprea penariensis Guillaumin – New Caledonia (Mt. Pénari)
  - Beauprea spathulaefolia Brongn. & Gris
- Beaupreopsis Virot
  - Beaupreopsis paniculata (Brongn. & Gris) Virot
- Eucarpha (R.Br.) Spach
  - Eucarpha deplanchei (Vieill. ex Brongn. & Gris) P.H.Weston & Mabb.
  - Eucarpha strobilina (Labill.) P.H.Weston & Mabb.
- Grevillea deplanchei Brongn. & Gris
- Grevillea exul Lindl.
- Grevillea gillivrayi Hook. – central and southeastern New Caledonia
- Grevillea macmillanii Guillaumin
- Grevillea meisneri Montrouz. – northwestern and west-central New Caledonia.
  - Grevillea meisneri var. argyrophylla Guillaumin – northwestern New Caledonia
  - Grevillea meisneri var. meisneri – northwestern and west-central New Caledonia
- Grevillea mondorensis Majourau & Pillon
- Grevillea nepwiensis Majourau & Pillon
- Grevillea rubiginosa Brongn. & Gris – southeastern New Caledonia
- Grevillea sinuata Brongn. & Gris
- Grevillea vuniana Pillon
- Kermadecia austrocaledonica (Brongn. & Gris) Benth. & Hook.f. ex B.D.Jacks.
- Kermadecia brinoniae H.C.Hopkins & Pillon
- Kermadecia pronyensis (Guillaumin) Guillaumin – west-central and southeastern New Caledonia
- Kermadecia rotundifolia Brongn. & Gris – northern and central New Caledonia
- Kermadecia sinuata Brongn. & Gris – northern and central New Caledonia
- Persoonia spathulifolia (Brongn. & Gris) Pillon
- Stenocarpus comptonii S.Moore – southeastern New Caledonia
- Stenocarpus dumbeensis Guillaumin – southeastern New Caledonia
- Stenocarpus gracilis Brongn. & Gris – northwestern and southeastern New Caledonia
- Stenocarpus heterophyllus Brongn. & Gris – southeastern New Caledonia
- Stenocarpus intermedius Brongn. & Gris
- Stenocarpus milnei Hook.
- Stenocarpus phyllodineus S.Moore – northwestern and west-central New Caledonia
- Stenocarpus rubiginosus Brongn. & Gris – northern and central New Caledonia
- Stenocarpus tremuloides Brongn. & Gris – eastern and southeastern New Caledonia
- Stenocarpus trinervis (Montrouz.) Guillaumin
- Stenocarpus umbelliferus (J.R.Forst. & G.Forst.) Druce
- Stenocarpus villosus Brongn. & Gris – northern and east-central New Caledonia
- Virotia L.A.S.Johnson & B.G.Briggs
  - Virotia angustifolia (Virot) P.H.Weston & A.R.Mast – northwestern New Caledonia
  - Virotia azurea H.C.Hopkins & Pillon
  - Virotia francii (Guillaumin) P.H.Weston & A.R.Mast
  - Virotia leptophylla (Guillaumin) L.A.S.Johnson & B.G.Briggs – central and southern New Caledonia
  - Virotia neurophylla (Guillaumin) P.H.Weston & A.R.Mast – southeastern New Caledonia
  - Virotia rousselii (Vieill.) P.H.Weston & A.R.Mast – central and northern New Caledonia
  - Virotia vieillardii (Brongn. & Gris) P.H.Weston & A.R.Mast – northwestern New Caledonia

== Psilotaceae ==
- Tmesipteris alticola Perrie & Brownsey
- Tmesipteris vieillardii P.A.Dang.

== Pteridaceae ==
- Acrostichum urvillei (Fée) C.Presl
- Adiantum fournieri Copel.
- Adiantum novae-caledoniae Keyserl.
- Antrophyum novae-caledoniae Hieron.
- Austrogramme francii (Rosenst.) Hennipman
- Austrogramme marginata (Mett.) E.Fourn.
- Pteris balansae E.Fourn.
- Pteris laevis Mett.
- Pteris novae-caledoniae Hook.
- Pteris vieillardii Mett.
- Syngramma magnifica (Copel.) Holttum

== Ranunculaceae ==
- Clematis novocaledoniaensis W.T.Wang

== Rhamnaceae ==
- Alphitonia neocaledonica (Schltr.) Guillaumin
- Gouania leratii Schltr.
- Jaffrea H.C.Hopkins & Pillon
  - Jaffrea erubescens (Baill.) H.C.Hopkins & Pillon – southern New Caledonia
  - Jaffrea xerocarpa (Baill.) H.C.Hopkins & Pillon
- Ventilago buxoides Baill.
- Ventilago neocaledonica Schltr.
- Ventilago pseudocalyculata Guillaumin – Loyalty Islands
- Ventilago tinctoria Cahen, Toussirot & Pillon

== Rhizophoraceae ==
- Crossostylis grandiflora Brongn. & Gris
- Crossostylis multiflora Brongn. & Gris
- Crossostylis sebertii Pancher ex Brongn. & Gris
- Rhizophora × tomlinsonii N.C.Duke (R. apiculata × R. samoensis)

== Rosaceae ==
- Rubus moluccanus var. neocaledonicus Schltr.

== Rubiaceae ==
- Achilleanthus glabrescens (Schltr.) J.G.Chavez, Liede & Meve
- Achilleanthus hypolasius (Baill.) J.G.Chavez
- Achilleanthus ngoyensis (Schltr.) J.G.Chavez
- Aidia congesta (Schltr. & K.Krause) Ridsdale – southeastern New Caledonia
- Aidia vieillardii (Baill.) Ridsdale
- Atractocarpus aragoensis Guillaumin
- Atractocarpus artensis (Montrouz.) Mouly
- Atractocarpus baladicus (Montrouz. ex Guillaumin & Beauvis.) Mouly
- Atractocarpus bracteatus Schltr. & K.Krause – east-central and southeastern New Caledonia
- Atractocarpus brandzeanus (Baill.) Mouly
- Atractocarpus colnettianus (Guillaumin) Mouly
- Atractocarpus confertus (Guillaumin) Mouly
- Atractocarpus cucumicarpus S.Moore
- Atractocarpus deplanchei (Vieill. ex Guillaumin) Mouly
- Atractocarpus heterophyllus (Montrouz.) Guillaumin & Beauvis. – northwestern and central New Caledonia
- Atractocarpus longistipitatus Guillaumin
- Atractocarpus mollis (Schltr.) Mouly
- Atractocarpus ngoyensis (Schltr.) Mouly
- Atractocarpus nigricans (Schltr.) Mouly
- Atractocarpus oblongus S.Moore
- Atractocarpus pancherianus (Guillaumin) Mouly
- Atractocarpus platixylon (Vieill. ex Pancher & Sebert) Guillaumin
- Atractocarpus pseudoterminalis (Guillaumin) Mouly
- Atractocarpus pterocarpon (Guillaumin) Puttock
- Atractocarpus rotundifolius Guillaumin
- Atractocarpus simulans Guillaumin
- Atractocarpus vaginatus Guillaumin
- Augusta austrocaledonica (Brongn.) J.H.Kirkbr.
- Coelospermum balansanum Baill.
- Coelospermum crassifolium J.T.Johanss. – southeastern New Caledonia
- Coelospermum fragrans (Montrouz.) Baill. ex Guillaumin – northwestern New Caledonia
- Coelospermum nomac Mouly & Fleurot
- Cyclophyllum baladense Guillaumin
- Cyclophyllum balansae (Baill.) Guillaumin
- Cyclophyllum calyculatum Guillaumin
- Cyclophyllum cardiocarpum (Baill.) Guillaumin
- Cyclophyllum cymosum S.Moore
- Cyclophyllum deplanchei Hook.f.
- Cyclophyllum fragrans (Schltr. & K.Krause) Mouly – northwestern New Caledonia
- Cyclophyllum francii Guillaumin
- Cyclophyllum guillauminianum Baum.-Bod. ex Mouly & Jeanson
- Cyclophyllum henriettiae (Baill.) Guillaumin
- Cyclophyllum jasminifolium Guillaumin & McKee
- Cyclophyllum letocartiorum Mouly
- Cyclophyllum macphersonii Mouly
- Cyclophyllum memaoyaense Mouly
- Cyclophyllum merrillianum Guillaumin
- Cyclophyllum pancheri (Baill.) Guillaumin
- Cyclophyllum pindaiense Mouly
- Cyclophyllum sagittatum (Baill.) Guillaumin
- Cyclophyllum subulatum (Baill.) Guillaumin
- Cyclophyllum tenuipes Guillaumin – New Caledonia (Î. des Pins)
- Cyclophyllum tieaense Mouly
- Cyclophyllum tiebaghiense Mouly & Jeanson
- Cyclophyllum vieillardii (Baill.) Guillaumin
- Eumachia collina (Labill.) Barrabé, C.M.Taylor & Razafim.
- Eumachia lyciiflora (Baill.) Barrabé, C.M.Taylor & Razafim.
- Eumachia oleoides (Baill.) Barrabé, C.M.Taylor & Razafim.
- Gardenia aubryi Vieill.
- Gardenia oudiepe Vieill.
- Gardenia schlechteri Bonati & Petitm.
- Gardenia urvillei Montrouz.
- Guettarda artensis Guillaumin
- Guettarda baladensis Guillaumin
- Guettarda fusca Pancher ex Baill.
- Guettarda heterosepala Guillaumin
- Guettarda humboldtensis Guillaumin
- Guettarda mephitica Guillaumin
- Guettarda splendens Baill.
- Guettarda trimera Guillaumin
- Guettarda vieillardii Guillaumin
- Guettarda wagapensis Guillaumin
- Guettardella ioensis (Baill.) J.G.Chavez
- Guettardella rhamnoides (Baill.) J.G.Chavez
- Gynochthodes artensis (Montrouz.) Razafim. & B.Bremer – New Caledonia (Île Art)
- Gynochthodes billardierei (Baill.) Razafim. & B.Bremer
- Gynochthodes candollei (Montrouz.) Razafim. & B.Bremer
- Gynochthodes collina (Schltr.) Razafim. & B.Bremer – central and southeastern New Caledonia
- Gynochthodes decipiens (Schltr.) Razafim. & B.Bremer – northwestern and central New Caledonia
- Gynochthodes deplanchei (Hook.f.) Razafim. & B.Bremer – northwestern and central New Caledonia
- Gynochthodes glaucescens (Schltr.) Razafim. & B.Bremer – New Caledonia (incl. Î. des Pins)
- Gynochthodes kanalensis (Baill. ex Guillaumin) Razafim. & B.Bremer – central and southeastern New Caledonia
- Gynochthodes montana (J.T.Johanss.) Razafim. & B.Bremer – northwestern New Caledonia
- Gynochthodes neocaledonica (S.Moore) Razafim. & B.Bremer – northwestern and west-central New Caledonia
- Gynochthodes phyllireoides (Labill.) Razafim. & B.Bremer
- Gynochthodes truncata (J.T.Johanss.) Razafim. & B.Bremer – New Caledonia (northern Mt. Kaala)
- Ixora aoupinieensis Hoang & Mouly
- Ixora buxina Baill.
- Ixora cauliflora Montrouz.
  - Ixora cauliflora var. cauliflora
  - Ixora cauliflora var. graciliflora Guillaumin
- Ixora clarae Mouly & Pisivin
- Ixora collina (Montrouz.) Beauvis.
- Ixora comptonii S.Moore
- Ixora dzumacensis Guillaumin
- Ixora elisae Mouly & Pisivin
- Ixora florida S.Moore
- Ixora francii Schltr. & K.Krause
- Ixora ixoroides (Guillaumin) Mouly & B.Bremer
- Ixora kuakuensis S.Moore
- Ixora lecardii Guillaumin
- Ixora longiloba Guillaumin
- Ixora margaretae (N.Hallé) Mouly & B.Bremer – New Caledonia (near Pouembout)
- Ixora neocaledonica Hochr.
- Ixora oligantha Schltr. & K.Krause
- Ixora schlechteri Bremek.
- Ixora vieillardii Guillaumin
- Ixora yaouhensis Schltr.
- Normandia Hook.f.
  - Normandia neocaledonica Hook.f.
- Psychotria amieuensis Guillaumin
- Psychotria ammericola Guillaumin
- Psychotria artensis (Montrouz.) Guillaumin – New Caledonia (Î. Art)
- Psychotria avenis Pancher ex Prain – New Caledonia ( Î. Belep)
- Psychotria baillonii Schltr.
- Psychotria baladensis (Baill.) Guillaumin
- Psychotria bourailensis Guillaumin
- Psychotria brachylaena (Baill.) Guillaumin
- Psychotria calliantha (Baill.) Guillaumin
- Psychotria calorhamnus (Baill.) Guillaumin ex Däniker
- Psychotria calothyrsa (Baill.) Guillaumin
- Psychotria canalensis (Baill.) Guillaumin
- Psychotria cardiochlamys (Baill.) Schltr.
- Psychotria comptonii S.Moore
- Psychotria coptosperma (Baill.) Guillaumin
- Psychotria declieuxioides S.Moore
- Psychotria deverdiana Guillaumin
- Psychotria faguetii (Baill.) Schltr.
- Psychotria fambartiae Barrabé
- Psychotria ferdinandi-muelleri Guillaumin
- Psychotria frondosa S.Moore
- Psychotria fuscopilosa Schltr.
- Psychotria gabrieliae (Baill.) Guillaumin
- Psychotria gneissica S.Moore
- Psychotria goniocarpa (Baill.) Guillaumin
- Psychotria guillauminiana Barrabé & Mouly
- Psychotria hootmawaapensis Barrabé & J.Florence
- Psychotria ianthina Guillaumin
- Psychotria ireneae Barrabé
- Psychotria leratii Guillaumin
- Psychotria lycioides (Baill.) Guillaumin
- Psychotria macroglossa (Baill.) Guillaumin
- Psychotria microglossa (Baill.) Baill. ex Guillaumin
- Psychotria micromyrtus (Baill.) Schltr.
- Psychotria monanthos (Baill.) Schltr.
- Psychotria montrouzieri Barrabé & J.Florence
- Psychotria nathaliae (Baill.) Guillaumin
- Psychotria nekouana (Baill.) Guillaumin
- Psychotria neodouarrei Barrabé & A.Martini
- Psychotria nigotei Barrabé
- Psychotria nummularioides Guillaumin
- Psychotria oua-tilouensis Guillaumin
- Psychotria oubatchensis Schltr.
- Psychotria pancheri (Baill.) Schltr.
- Psychotria pininsularis Guillaumin
- Psychotria poissoniana (Baill.) Guillaumin ex S.Moore
- Psychotria pseudomicrodaphne Guillaumin
- Psychotria pubituba S.Moore
- Psychotria pulchrebracteata Guillaumin
- Psychotria roseotincta S.Moore
- Psychotria rosmarinifolia (Baill.) Schltr.
- Psychotria rubefacta (S.Moore) Guillaumin
- Psychotria rupicola (Baill.) Schltr.
- Psychotria sagittalis (Baill.) Guillaumin
- Psychotria saltiensis (S.Moore) Guillaumin
- Psychotria schlechteriana K.Krause
- Psychotria schumanniana Schltr.
- Psychotria semperflorens (Beauvis.) Pancher ex Prain
- Psychotria spachiana (Baill.) Guillaumin ex Barrabé & Mouly
- Psychotria toninensis S.Moore
- Psychotria trisulcata (Baill.) Guillaumin
- Psychotria unioensis Guillaumin
- Psychotria veillonii Barrabé – New Caledonia (Plateau de la Tiébaghi
- Psychotria vieillardii (Baill.) Guillaumin
- Psychotria wagapensis Guillaumin
- Psydrax paradoxus (Virot) Mouly
- Tarenna hexamera (Schltr. & K.Krause) Jérémie
- Tarenna ignambiensis (Guillaumin) Jérémie – northwestern and central New Caledonia
- Tarenna leioloba (Guillaumin) S.Moore – central and southeastern New Caledonia
- Tarenna lifouana (Däniker) Jérémie – New Caledonia (Loyalty Islands)
- Tarenna microcarpa (Guillaumin) Jérémie – New Caledonia (incl. Loyalty Islands)
- Tarenna peekeliana Valeton
- Tarenna rhypalostigma (Schltr.) Bremek.
- Tarenna truncatocalyx (Guillaumin) Bremek. – New Caledonia (incl. Loyalty Islands)
  - Tarenna truncatocalyx var. artensis (Guillaumin) Jérémie – New Caledonia (Î. Art)
  - Tarenna truncatocalyx var. truncatocalyx – New Caledonia (incl. Loyalty Islands)
- Tarenna unioensis (Guillaumin) Jérémie
- Tarenna verticillata Jérémie – central New Caledonia
- Tarenna warburgiana Valeton
- Thiollierea Montrouz.
  - Thiollierea artensis Montrouz. – northwestern New Caledonia
  - Thiollierea campanulata (Brongn.) Baum.-Bod. – central and southeastern New Caledonia
  - Thiollierea dagostinii Barrabé & Mouly
  - Thiollierea kaalaensis (N.Hallé & Jérémie) Barrabé & Mouly, – northwestern New Caledonia (Mt. Kaala)
  - Thiollierea laureana Mouly
  - Thiollierea lenormandii (N.Hallé & Jérémie) Barrabé & Mouly – northwestern New Caledonia
  - Thiollierea macrophylla (Brongn.) Baum.-Bod. – central and southeastern New Caledonia
  - Thiollierea montana (Vieill.) Paudyal & Delprete
  - Thiollierea naounarum Fleurot & Barrabé
  - Thiollierea neriifolia (Brongn.) Barrabé & Mouly – northwestern New Caledonia
  - Thiollierea pachyphylla (Guillaumin) Barrabé & Mouly – southestern New Caledonia
  - Thiollierea papineaui Barrabé & Fleurot
  - Thiollierea parviflora (Schltr. & K.Krause) Barrabé & Mouly – southeastern New Caledonia
  - Thiollierea propinqua (Brongn. & Gris) Paudyal & Delprete
  - Thiollierea retusiflora (Brongn.) Barrabé & Mouly – north-central New Caledonia
  - Thiollierea rigaultii Barrabé & Mouly – west-central New Caledonia
  - Thiollierea tubiflora (Brongn.) Barrabé & Mouly – southeastern New Caledonia
- Timonius balansanus (Baill.) Schltr.
- Timonius eximius (Baill.) Schltr.
- Timonius neocaledonicus Schltr. & K.Krause
- Timonius platycarpus Montrouz.
- Tinadendron noumeanum (Baill.) Achille

== Rutaceae ==
- Boronia hartleyi Duretto & Bayly
- Boronia koniambiensis Däniker
- Boronia pancheri (Baill.) Duretto & Bayly
- Boronia parvifolia (Baker f.) Duretto & Bayly
- Citrus neocaledonica Guillaumin
- Citrus oxanthera Beauvis.
- Citrus undulata Guillaumin
- Comptonella Baker f.
  - Comptonella baudouinii (Baill.) T.G.Hartley
  - Comptonella drupacea (Labill.) Guillaumin
  - Comptonella fruticosa T.G.Hartley - northwestern New Caledonia
  - Comptonella glabra T.G.Hartley - northwestern New Caledonia
  - Comptonella lactea (Baker f.) T.G.Hartley
    - Comptonella lactea var. lactea
    - Comptonella lactea var. poissonii (Guillaumin) T.G.Hartley - southeastern New Caledonia
  - Comptonella microcarpa (G.Perkins) T.G.Hartley
  - Comptonella oreophila (Guillaumin) T.G.Hartley - southeastern New Caledonia
    - Comptonella oreophila var. longipes (Guillaumin) T.G.Hartley
    - Comptonella oreophila var. oreophila – southeastern New Caledonia
  - Comptonella sessilifoliola (Guillaumin) T.G.Hartley
- Crossosperma T.G.Hartley
  - Crossosperma cauliflora T.G.Hartley - central New Caledonia
  - Crossosperma velutina (Guillaumin) T.G.Hartley - northwestern and southeastern New Caledonia
- Dutailliopsis T.G.Hartley
  - Dutailliopsis gordonii T.G.Hartley - southeastern New Caledonia
- Dutaillyea Baill.
  - Dutaillyea amosensis (Guillaumin) T.G.Hartley
  - Dutaillyea comptonii Baker f.
  - Dutaillyea trifoliolata Baill.
- Euodia tietaensis (Guillaumin) T.G.Hartley
- Geijera balansae (Baill.) Schinz & Guillaumin
- Geijera cauliflora Baill.
- Geijera tartarea T.G.Hartley ex Munzinger & Bruy
- Medicosma articulata T.G.Hartley
- Medicosma congesta T.G.Hartley
- Medicosma diversifolia T.G.Hartley
- Medicosma emarginata T.G.Hartley
- Medicosma exigua T.G.Hartley
- Medicosma gracilis T.G.Hartley
- Medicosma latifolia T.G.Hartley
- Medicosma leratii (Guillaumin) T.G.Hartley
- Medicosma obliqua T.G.Hartley
- Medicosma parvifolia T.G.Hartley
- Medicosma petiolaris T.G.Hartley
- Medicosma suberosa T.G.Hartley
- Medicosma subsessilis T.G.Hartley
- Medicosma tahafeana T.G.Hartley
- Medicosma verticillata T.G.Hartley
- Melicope fulva (Guillaumin) B.C.Stone
- Melicope glaberrima Guillaumin
- Melicope lasioneura (Baill.) Baill. ex Guillaumin
- Melicope leptococca Guillaumin
- Melicope montana Baker f.
- Melicope pedicellata T.G.Hartley
- Melicope vieillardii (Baill.) Guillaumin
- Micromelum coriaceum Seem.
- Myrtopsis Engl.
  - Myrtopsis calophylla (Baill.) Guillaumin
  - Myrtopsis corymbosa (Labill.) Guillaumin
  - Myrtopsis deplanchei (Baill.) Guillaumin
  - Myrtopsis macrocarpa Schltr.
  - Myrtopsis myrtoidea (Baill.) Guillaumin
  - Myrtopsis novae-caledoniae Engl.
  - Myrtopsis pomaderridifolia (Baill.) Guillaumin
  - Myrtopsis sellingii Guillaumin
- Neoschmidia T.G.Hartley
  - Neoschmidia calycina T.G.Hartley
  - Neoschmidia pallida T.G.Hartley - central and southern New Caledonia
- Picrella Baill.
  - Picrella glandulosa T.G.Hartley
  - Picrella ignambiensis (Guillaumin) T.G.Hartley & Mabb.
  - Picrella trifoliata Baill.
    - Picrella trifoliata var. gracilis (Baill.) T.G.Hartley & Mabb.
    - Picrella trifoliata var. gracillima T.G.Hartley
    - Picrella trifoliata var. trifoliata
- Sarcomelicope argyrophylla Guillaumin
- Sarcomelicope dogniensis T.G.Hartley
- Sarcomelicope follicularis T.G.Hartley
- Sarcomelicope glauca T.G.Hartley
- Sarcomelicope leiocarpa (P.S.Green) T.G.Hartley
- Sarcomelicope megistophylla T.G.Hartley
- Sarcomelicope pembaiensis T.G.Hartley
- Sarcomelicope sarcococca (Baill.) Engl.
- Zanthoxylum albiflorum Baker f.
- Zanthoxylum canalense (Guillaumin) P.G.Waterman
- Zanthoxylum leratii Guillaumin
- Zanthoxylum neocaledonicum Baker f.
- Zanthoxylum oreophilum (Guillaumin) P.G.Waterman
- Zanthoxylum pancheri P.S.Green
- Zanthoxylum sarasinii Guillaumin
- Zanthoxylum schlechteri Guillaumin
- Zieria chevalieri Virot

== Salicaceae ==
- Casearia coriifolia Lescot & Sleumer – north-central and south-central New Caledonia
- Casearia deplanchei Sleumer – northwestern and west-central New Caledonia
- Casearia kaalaensis Lescot & Sleumer – northwestern New Caledonia
- Casearia lifuana Däniker – New Caledonia (Î Lifou)
- Casearia puberula Guillaumin
- Casearia silvana Schltr.
- Homalium austrocaledonicum Seem.
- Homalium betulifolium Däniker – southeastern New Caledonia
- Homalium buxifolium Däniker – northwestern New Caledonia
- Homalium decurrens (Vieill.) Briq. – northwestern and west-central New Caledonia
- Homalium deplanchei (Vieill.) Warb.
- Homalium francii Guillaumin
- Homalium guillainii (Vieill.) Briq.
- Homalium intermedium (Vieill.) Briq. – northern New Caledonia
- Homalium juxtapositum Sleumer – west-central New Caledonia
- Homalium kanaliense (Vieill.) Briq. – east-central and southeastern New Caledonia
  - Homalium kanaliense var. boulindae Sleumer – west-central New Caledonia
  - Homalium kanaliense var. kanaliense – east-central and southeastern New Caledonia
- Homalium leratiorum Guillaumin
- Homalium mathieuanum (Vieill.) Briq. – northwestern New Caledonia
- Homalium polystachyum (Vieill.) Briq. – northern New Caledonia
- Homalium rivulare (Vieill.) Briq. – northern New Caledonia
- Homalium rubiginosum (Vieill.) Warb. – north-central and central New Caledonia
- Homalium rubrocostatum Sleumer – west-central New Caledonia
- Homalium serratum Guillaumin
- Homalium sleumerianum Lescot – central New Caledonia
- Xylosma bernardiana Sleumer – northwestern and west-central New Caledonia
- Xylosma boulindae Sleumer – west-central New Caledonia
- Xylosma capillipes Guillaumin – southeastern New Caledonia
- Xylosma confusa Guillaumin – southeastern New Caledonia
- Xylosma cordifolia (Sleumer) Pillon – north-central New Caledonia
- Xylosma dothioensis Guillaumin – central New Caledonia
- Xylosma fasciculata Guillaumin
- Xylosma gigantifolia Sleumer
- Xylosma grossecrenata (Sleumer) Lescot – west-central New Caledonia
- Xylosma hurlimannii Guillaumin – southeastern New Caledonia
- Xylosma inaequinervia Sleumer – west-central New Caledonia
- Xylosma kaalaensis Sleumer – New Caledonia
- Xylosma koghiensis Guillaumin – southeastern New Caledonia
- Xylosma lancifolia Sleumer – north-central New Caledonia
- Xylosma lifuana Guillaumin – New Caledonia (Loyalty Islands, Î des Pins)
- Xylosma mandjeliana (Sleumer) Pillon – northern New Caledonia
- Xylosma molesta Sleumer – west-central and central New Caledonia
- Xylosma nervosa Guillaumin
- Xylosma pancheri Guillaumin
- Xylosma peltata (Sleumer) Lescot – southeastern New Caledonia
- Xylosma pininsularis Guillaumin – north-central New Caledonia (and Î. des Pins)
- Xylosma planchonellifolia Guillaumin – central and southeastern New Caledonia
- Xylosma pseudocoriacea (Sleumer) Pillon – central New Caledonia
- Xylosma reticulata (Schltr.) Pillon – northern and west-central New Caledonia
- Xylosma rivularis (Sleumer) Pillon – southeastern New Caledonia
- Xylosma serpentina Sleumer – northwestern New Caledonia
- Xylosma trichostemona Guillaumin – southeastern New Caledonia
- Xylosma tuberculata Sleumer – west-central New Caledonia
- Xylosma vincentii Guillaumin – west-central and southeastern New Caledonia
- Xylosma zongoi Pillon – northern and north-central New Caledonia

== Santalaceae ==
- Amphorogyne Stauffer & Hürl.
  - Amphorogyne celastroides Stauffer & Hürl. – west-central and southeastern New Caledonia
  - Amphorogyne spicata Stauffer & Hürl. – central and southeastern New Caledonia
  - Amphorogyne staufferi Markgr. ex Stauffer – east-central and southeastern New Caledonia
- Daenikera Hürl. & Stauffer
  - Daenikera corallina Hürl. & Stauffer central and southeastern New Caledonia
- Exocarpos baumannii Stauffer northwestern and southeastern New Caledonia
- Exocarpos clavatus Stauffer – southeastern New Caledonia
- Exocarpos montanus (Stauffer) Baum.-Bod.
- Exocarpos neocaledonicus Schltr. & Pilg.
- Exocarpos pseudocasuarina Guillaumin – southeastern New Caledonia
- Exocarpos spathulatus Schltr. & Pilg. – southeastern New Caledonia
- Korthalsella amentacea (Tiegh.) Engl. – New Caledonia ( Î. Art)
- Korthalsella dichotoma (Tiegh.) Engl.
  - Korthalsella dichotoma var. balansae (Tiegh.) Danser
  - Korthalsella dichotoma var. dichotoma
- Korthalsella striata Danser – east-central New Caledonia (and Î. des Pins)
- Santalum austrocaledonicum var. glabrum Hürl. – New Caledonia (Loyalty Islands)
- Santalum austrocaledonicum var. minutum N.Hallé – northwestern New Caledonia
- Santalum austrocaledonicum var. pilosulum N.Hallé – southern New Caledonia

== Sapindaceae ==
- Alectryon hirsutus Munzinger
- Cossinia trifoliata (Baill.) Radlk.
- Cupaniopsis apiocarpa Radlk.
- Cupaniopsis azantha Radlk.
- Cupaniopsis chytradenia Radlk.
- † Cupaniopsis crassivalvis Radlk.
- Cupaniopsis grisea Adema
- Cupaniopsis hypodermatica Radlk. – New Caledonia (Loyalty Islands)
- Cupaniopsis mackeeana Adema
- Cupaniopsis macrocarpa Radlk. – central and southeastern New Caledonia
  - Cupaniopsis macrocarpa var. macrocarpa – central and southeastern New Caledonia
  - Cupaniopsis macrocarpa var. polyphylla Adema – northwestern and southeastern New Caledonia
- Cupaniopsis megalocarpa Adema
- Cupaniopsis petiolulata Radlk.
- Cupaniopsis phalacrocarpa Adema
- Cupaniopsis sylvatica Guillaumin – New Caledonia (incl. Î. des Pins)
- Cupaniopsis trigonocarpa Radlk.
- Elattostachys dzumacensis Adema
- Elattostachys incisa Radlk.
- Gongrodiscus Radlk.
  - Gongrodiscus bilocularis H.Turner
  - Gongrodiscus parvifolius Radlk.
  - Gongrodiscus sufferrugineus Radlk.
- Guioa aryteroides Guillaumin
- Guioa crenata Radlk.
- Guioa crenulata Radlk.
- Guioa fusca Radlk.
- Guioa glauca (Labill.) Radlk.
- Guioa gracilis (Pancher & Sebert) Radlk.
- Guioa koniamboensis Guillaumin
- Guioa microsepala Radlk.
- Guioa ovalis Radlk.
- Guioa pectinata Radlk.
- Guioa villosa Radlk.
- Harpullia austrocaledonica Baill.
- Lepidocupania arcuata (Radlk.) Buerki
- Lepidocupania fruticosa (Radlk.) Buerki, Callm., Munzinger & Lowry – southwestern New Caledonia
- Lepidocupania glabra (Adema) Buerki
- Lepidocupania globosa (Adema) Buerki
- Lepidocupania glomeriflora (Radlk.) Buerki, Callm., Munzinger & Lowry – New Caledonia (incl. Loyalty Islands)
- Lepidocupania gracilipes (Radlk.) Buerki, Callm., Munzinger & Lowry
- Lepidocupania grandiflora (Adema) Buerki, Callm., Munzinger & Lowry
- Lepidocupania inoplea (Radlk.) Buerki, Callm., Munzinger & Lowry – northwestern New Caledonia (incl. Loyalty Islands)
- Lepidocupania lepidota (Radlk.) Buerki, Callm., Munzinger & Lowry
- Lepidocupania mouana (Guillaumin) Buerki, Callm., Munzinger & Lowry – New Caledonia (Mt. Mou)
- Lepidocupania myrmoctona (Radlk.) Buerki, Callm., Munzinger & Lowry
- Lepidocupania oedipoda (Radlk.) Buerki, Callm., Munzinger & Lowry
- Lepidocupania pennelii (Guillaumin) Buerki, Callm., Munzinger & Lowry
- Lepidocupania rosea (Adema) Buerki, Callm., Munzinger & Lowry
- Lepidocupania squamosa (Adema) Buerki, Callm., Munzinger & Lowry
- Lepidocupania subfalcata (Adema) Buerki, Callm., Munzinger & Lowry – New Caledonia (Mt. Koniambo)
- Lepidocupania tontoutensis (Guillaumin) Buerki, Callm., Munzinger & Lowry
- Loxodiscus Hook.f.
  - Loxodiscus coriaceus Hook.f. – New Caledonia (Î. des Pins)
- Neoarytera chartacea (Radlk.) Callm., Buerki, Munzinger & Lowry
- Neoarytera collina (Pancher & Sebert) Callm., Buerki, Munzinger & Lowry
- Neoarytera nekorensis (H.Turner) Callm., Buerki, Munzinger & Lowry – west-central New Caledonia
- Podonephelium Baill.
  - Podonephelium concolor Radlk.
  - Podonephelium cristagalli Munzinger
  - Podonephelium davidsonii Munzinger
  - Podonephelium gongrocarpum (Radlk.) Munzinger, Lowry, Callm. & Buerki
  - Podonephelium homei (Seem.) Radlk.
  - Podonephelium pachycaule Munzinger, Lowry, Callm. & Buerki
  - Podonephelium parvifolium Radlk.
  - Podonephelium plicatum Munzinger, Lowry, Callm. & Buerki
  - Podonephelium subaequilaterum Radlk.
- Storthocalyx Radlk.
  - Storthocalyx chryseus Radlk.
  - Storthocalyx corymbosus Munzinger, Lowry, Buerki & Callm.
  - Storthocalyx leioneurus Radlk.
  - Storthocalyx pancheri (Baill.) Radlk. – southeastern New Caledonia
  - Storthocalyx sordidus Radlk.

== Sapotaceae ==
- Pichonia balansae (Baehni) Swenson & Munzinger – north-central and southeastern New Caledonia
- Pichonia balansana Pierre – northwestern and south-central New Caledonia (incl. Loyalty Islands)
- Pichonia daenikeri (Aubrév.) Swenson, Bartish & Munzinger
- Pichonia deplanchei (Baill.) Swenson & Munzinger
- Pichonia dubia (Pierre ex Guillaumin) Swenson & Munzinger
- Pichonia grandiflora Swenson & Munzinger – west-central New Caledonia
- Pichonia lecomtei (Guillaumin) T.D.Penn. – New Caledonia
- Pichonia munzingeri Gâteblé & Swenson
- Planchonella amieuana (Guillaumin) Aubrév. – New Caledonia (Col d'Amieu)
- Planchonella baillonii (Zahlbr.) Dubard – east-central and southeastern New Caledonia
- Planchonella cauliflora Munzinger & Swenson – New Caledonia (Mt. Do)
- Planchonella cinerea (Pancher ex Baill.) P.Royen – northwestern and southeastern New Caledonia
- Planchonella contermina Pierre ex Dubard – northwestern New Caledonia
- Planchonella crassinervia Dubard
- Planchonella crenata Munzinger & Swenson – west-central New Caledonia
- Planchonella dothioensis (Aubrév.) Swenson, Bartish & Munzinger
- Planchonella endlicheri (Montrouz.) Guillaumin – east-central and southeastern New Caledonia
- Planchonella ericiflora Munzinger & Swenson – southern New Caledonia
- Planchonella glauca Swenson & Munzinger – northern New Caledonia
- Planchonella kaalaensis Aubrév. – northwestern New Caledonia
- Planchonella koumaciensis Aubrév. – northwestern New Caledonia
- Planchonella kuebiniensis Aubrév. – central and southeastern New Caledonia
- Planchonella laetevirens (Baill.) Pierre ex Dubard – southeastern New Caledonia
- Planchonella latihila Munzinger & Swenson – southeastern New Caledonia
- Planchonella lauracea (Baill.) Dubard
- Planchonella leptostylidifolia Guillaumin – northwestern New Caledonia
- Planchonella lifuana (Baill.) Pierre ex Dubard – central New Caledonia
- Planchonella luteocostata Munzinger & Swenson – western New Caledonia
- Planchonella mandjeliana Munzinger & Swenson – northern New Caledonia
- Planchonella microphylla Pierre ex Dubard – southeastern New Caledonia
- Planchonella minutiflora Munzinger & Swenson – northwestern New Caledonia
- Planchonella pinifolia (Baill.) Dubard
- Planchonella povilana Swenson & Munzinger – northeastern New Caledonia
- Planchonella pronyensis Guillaumin – southeastern New Caledonia
- Planchonella reticulata (Baill.) Pierre ex Dubard – east-central New Caledonia
- Planchonella rheophytopsis P.Royen – central New Caledonia
- Planchonella roseoloba Munzinger & Swenson – north-central and central New Caledonia
- Planchonella rufocostata Munzinger & Swenson – northeastern New Caledonia
- Planchonella saligna S.Moore – west-central and northwestern New Caledonia
- Planchonella serpentinicola Swenson & Munzinger
- Planchonella skottsbergii Guillaumin – southeastern New Caledonia
- Planchonella sphaerocarpa (Baill.) Dubard – central and west-central New Caledonia
- Planchonella thiensis Aubrév.
- Planchonella ulfii Munzinger
- Planchonella wakere (Pancher & Sebert) Pierre – southeastern New Caledonia
- Pleioluma acutifolia Swenson & Munzinger – southeastern New Caledonia
- Pleioluma azou (P.Royen) Swenson & Munzinger – southeastern New Caledonia
- Pleioluma balansana (Pierre ex Baill.) Swenson & Munzinger
- Pleioluma baueri (Montrouz.) Swenson & Munzinger
- Pleioluma belepensis Swenson & Munzinger – New Caledonia (N. Î. Art)
- Pleioluma butinii Swenson & Munzinger – northern and northwestern New Caledonia
- Pleioluma crebrifolia (Baill.) Swenson & Munzinger
- Pleioluma dioica Swenson & Munzinger
- Pleioluma lasiantha (Baill.) Swenson & Munzinger – central and southeastern New Caledonia
- Pleioluma longipetiolata (Aubrév.) Swenson & Munzinger
- Pleioluma lucens (P.Royen) Swenson & Munzinger – southeastern New Caledonia
- Pleioluma novocaledonica (Dubard) Swenson & Munzinger – east-central and southeastern New Caledonia
- Pleioluma rubicunda (Pierre ex Baill.) Swenson & Munzinger
- Pleioluma sebertii (Pancher) Swenson & Munzinger – southeastern New Caledonia
- Pleioluma tchingouensis Swenson & Munzinger – north-central New Caledonia
- Pleioluma tenuipedicellata Swenson & Munzinger
- Pleioluma vieillardii (Baill.) Swenson & Munzinger – west-central New Caledonia (NW. massif Koniambo)
- Pycnandra Benth.
  - Pycnandra acuminata (Pierre ex Baill.) Swenson & Munzinger – southeastern New Caledonia
  - Pycnandra amplexicaulis Munzinger & Swenson
  - Pycnandra atrofusca Swenson & Munzinger – central and southeastern New Caledonia
  - Pycnandra balansae (Baill.) Swenson & Munzinger
  - Pycnandra belepensis Swenson & Munzinger – New Caledonia (Î. Art)
  - Pycnandra benthamii Baill. – central New Caledonia
  - Pycnandra blaffartii Swenson & Munzinger – northeastern New Caledonia
  - Pycnandra blanchonii (Aubrév.) Swenson & Munzinger – northwestern and west-central New Caledonia
  - Pycnandra bourailensis Swenson & Munzinger – western New Caledonia (near Bourail)
  - Pycnandra bracteolata Swenson & Munzinger – northeastern New Caledonia
  - Pycnandra caeruleilatex Swenson & Munzinger – southeastern New Caledonia
  - Pycnandra canaliculata Swenson & Munzinger – southeastern New Caledonia
  - Pycnandra carinocostata Vink – central and southeastern New Caledonia
  - Pycnandra chartacea Vink – southeastern New Caledonia
  - Pycnandra comptonii (S.Moore) Vink – northern and central New Caledonia
  - Pycnandra comptonioides Swenson & Munzinger
  - Pycnandra confusa Swenson & Munzinger – southeastern New Caledonia
  - Pycnandra controversa (Guillaumin) Vink – northern and central New Caledonia
  - Pycnandra cylindricarpa Swenson & Munzinger – northeastern and north-central New Caledonia
  - Pycnandra decandra (Montrouz.) Vink
    - Pycnandra decandra subsp. coriacea (Baill.) Swenson & Munzinger – central and southeastern New Caledonia
    - Pycnandra decandra subsp. decandra – northwestern New Caledonia (incl. Î. Art)
  - Pycnandra deplanchei (Baill.) Swenson & Munzinger – central New Caledonia
    - Pycnandra deplanchei subsp. deplanchei – east-central New Caledonia
    - Pycnandra deplanchei subsp. floribunda (S.Moore) Swenson & Munzinger – south-central New Caledonia
  - Pycnandra elliptica Swenson & Munzinger – southeastern New Caledonia
  - Pycnandra fastuosa (Baill.) Vink – central and southeastern New Caledonia
  - Pycnandra filipes (Benth.) Munzinger & Swenson
    - Pycnandra filipes subsp. filipes
    - Pycnandra filipes subsp. multiflora (Vink) Munzinger & Swenson – northwestern New Caledonia
  - Pycnandra francii (Guillaumin & Dubard) Swenson & Munzinger – east-central and southeastern New Caledonia
  - Pycnandra glabella Swenson & Munzinger – east-central and southeastern New Caledonia
  - Pycnandra glaberrima Swenson & Munzinger – central New Caledonia
  - Pycnandra gordoniifolia (S.Moore) Swenson & Munzinger – central and southeastern New Caledonia
  - Pycnandra goroensis (Aubrév.) Munzinger & Swenson – southeastern New Caledonia
  - Pycnandra grandifolia (Vink) Munzinger & Swenson – central and south-central New Caledonia
  - Pycnandra griseosepala Vink
  - Pycnandra heteromera (Vink) Swenson & Munzinger – southeastern New Caledonia
  - Pycnandra intermedia (Baill.) Swenson & Munzinger – southeastern New Caledonia
  - Pycnandra kaalaensis Aubrév. – northwestern and west-central New Caledonia
  - Pycnandra kopetoensis Munzinger & Swenson
  - Pycnandra kouakouensis Swenson & Munzinger
  - Pycnandra linearifolia Swenson & Munzinger – New Caledonia (Massif du Panié)
  - Pycnandra lissophylla (Pierre ex Baill.) Swenson & Munzinger – east-central and southeastern New Caledonia
  - Pycnandra litseiflora (Guillaumin) Swenson & Munzinger – northwestern and west-central New Caledonia
  - Pycnandra longiflora (Benth.) Munzinger & Swenson – northwestern New Caledonia
  - Pycnandra longipetiolata Swenson & Munzinger – central-western New Caledonia
  - Pycnandra margueriteae Munzinger & Swenson
  - † Pycnandra micrantha (Beauvis.) Munzinger & Swenson – New Caledonia (Î. Art)
  - Pycnandra montana Swenson & Munzinger
  - Pycnandra neocaledonica (S.Moore) Vink – northwestern New Caledonia
  - Pycnandra obscurinerva (Vink) Swenson & Munzinger – northwestern and west-central New Caledonia
  - Pycnandra ouaiemensis Swenson & Munzinger – New Caledonia (Massif du Ton Non)
  - Pycnandra paniensis Aubrév. – New Caledonia (Mt. Panié)
  - Pycnandra paucinervia Swenson & Munzinger – northeastern New Caledonia
  - Pycnandra perplexa Swenson & Gâteblé
  - Pycnandra petiolata (Vink) Munzinger & Swenson
  - Pycnandra poindimiensis Swenson & Munzinger
  - Pycnandra pubiflora Swenson & Munzinger – southeastern New Caledonia
  - Pycnandra sarlinii (Aubrév.) Swenson & Munzinger – central New Caledonia
  - Pycnandra schmidii (Aubrév.) Swenson & Munzinger – central New Caledonia
  - Pycnandra sclerophylla Munzinger & Swenson
  - Pycnandra sessiliflora Swenson & Munzinger – central and southeastern New Caledonia
  - Pycnandra sessilifolia (Pancher & Sebert) Swenson & Munzinger – central and southeastern New Caledonia
  - Pycnandra versicolor Swenson & Munzinger
  - Pycnandra vieillardii (Baill.) Vink – northern and central New Caledonia
  - Pycnandra viridifolia Swenson & Munzinger – central New Caledonia
  - Pycnandra wagapensis (Guillaumin) Munzinger & Swenson – north-central and central New Caledonia

== Schizaeaceae ==
- Lygodium hians E.Fourn.
- Schizaea balansae E.Fourn.
- Schizaea × diversispora Bierh. (S. dichotoma × S. pseudodichotoma)
- Schizaea intermedia Mett.
- Schizaea laevigata Mett.
- Schizaea macrofunda (Bierh.) ined.
- Schizaea oligostachys (Bierh.) ined.
- Schizaea pseudodichotoma Bierh.
- Schizaea rhacoindusiata Bierh.
- Schizaea tenuis E.Fourn.

== Scrophulariaceae ==
- Myoporum cuneifolium Kraenzl.
- Myoporum rotundatum S.Moore,
- Myoporum tenuifolium G.Forst.
- Myoporum tubiflorum Kraenzl.

== Selaginellaceae ==
- Selaginella hordeiformis Baker
- Selaginella megastachya Baker
- Selaginella neocaledonica Baker
- Selaginella sespillifolia Brownlie
- Selaginella vieillardii Warb.

== Simaroubaceae ==
- Soulamea cardioptera Baill.
- Soulamea cycloptera Guillaumin
- Soulamea dagostinii Jaffré & Fambart
- Soulamea fraxinifolia Brongn. & Gris
- Soulamea moratii Jaffré & Fambart
- Soulamea muelleri Brongn. & Gris
- Soulamea pancheri Brongn. & Gris
- Soulamea pelletieri Jaffré & Fambart
- Soulamea rigaultii Jaffré & Fambart
- Soulamea tomentosa Brongn. & Gris
- Soulamea trifoliata Baill.

== Smilacaceae ==
- Smilax ligustrifolia A.DC.
- Smilax neocaledonica Schltr.
- Smilax orbiculata Labill.
- Smilax plurifurcata A.DC.
- Smilax purpurata G.Forst.
- Smilax tetraptera Schltr.

== Solanaceae ==
- Solanum actephilum Guillaumin – central New Caledonia
- Solanum artense Montr – northwestern New Caledonia
- Solanum austrocaledonicum Seem.
- Solanum camptostylum Bitter – central New Caledonia
- Solanum hugonis Heine – west-central New Caledonia
- Solanum insulae-pinorum Heine – New Caledonia (Î. des Pins)
- Solanum leratii Schltr.
- Solanum memaoyanum D.H.R.McClell.
- Solanum pancheri Guillaumin – west-central and southwestern New Caledonia
- Solanum pseuderanthemoides Schltr. – southwestern New Caledonia
- Solanum semisucculentum D.H.R.McClell.
- Solanum vaccinioides Schltr. – west-central New Caledonia

== Stemonuraceae ==
- Gastrolepis Tiegh.
  - Gastrolepis alticola Munzinger
  - Gastrolepis austrocaledonica (Baill.) R.A.Howard – central and southeastern New Caledonia
- Strasburgeria Baill.
  - Strasburgeria robusta (Vieill. ex Pancher & Sebert) Guillaumin

== Symplocaceae ==
- Symplocos arborea (Vieill.) Brongn. & Gris
- Symplocos caerulescens (Vieill.) Brongn. & Gris – central and southeastern New Caledonia
- Symplocos flavescens Brand – east-central and southeastern New Caledonia
  - Symplocos flavescens var. flavescens – east-central and southeastern New Caledonia
  - Symplocos flavescens var. pseudonitida (Guillaumin) Noot. – central and southeastern New Caledonia
- Symplocos gracilis Brongn. & Gris – northern and southeastern New Caledonia
- Symplocos montana (Vieill.) Brongn. & Gris – northwestern New Caledonia
  - Symplocos montana var. baptica (Brongn. & Gris) Noot.
  - Symplocos montana var. montana – northwestern New Caledonia
  - Symplocos montana var. munda (S.Moore) Noot.
  - Symplocos montana var. tortuosa (Guillaumin) Noot.
  - Symplocos montana var. ultrabasica Noot.
- Symplocos neocaledonica (Vieill.) Noot. – northwestern and central New Caledonia
- Symplocos paniensis Pillon & Noot.

== Taxaceae ==
- Austrotaxus Compton
  - Austrotaxus spicata Compton

== Thymelaeaceae ==
- Deltaria Steenis
  - Deltaria brachyblastophora Steenis
- Lethedon balansae (Baill.) Kosterm.
- Lethedon calleana (Guillaumin) Kosterm.
- Lethedon cernua (Baill.) Kosterm.
- Lethedon ciliaris (Baill.) Kosterm.
- Lethedon comptonii (Baker f.) Kosterm.
- Lethedon cordatoretusa Aymonin
- Lethedon leratii (Guillaumin) Kosterm.
- Lethedon microphylla (Guillaumin) Kosterm.
- Lethedon oblonga (Schltr.) Kosterm.
- Lethedon ovata (Guillaumin) Kosterm.
- Lethedon salicifolia (Labill.) Aymonin
- Lethedon sphaerocarpa (Baill. ex Guillaumin) Kosterm.
- Lethedon thornei (Guillaumin) Aymonin
- Solmsia Baill.
  - Solmsia calophylla Baill.

== Trimeniaceae ==
- Trimenia neocaledonica Baker f. – northern and west-central New Caledonia

== Violaceae ==
- Agatea lecointei Munzinger
- Agatea longipedicellata (Baker f.) Guillaumin & Thorne
- Agatea pancheri (Brongn.) K.Schum. ex Melch.
- Agatea rufotomentosa (Baker f.) Munzinger
- Agatea schlechteri Melch.
- Agatea veillonii Munzinger
- Hybanthus austrocaledonicus (Vieill.) Melch.
- Hybanthus micranthus Guillaumin

== Winteraceae ==
- Zygogynum acsmithii Vink – southeastern New Caledonia
- Zygogynum amplexicaule (Vieill. ex P.Parm.) Vink – northern and west-central New Caledonia
  - Zygogynum amplexicaule subsp. amplexicaule – northern and west-central New Caledonia
  - Zygogynum amplexicaule var. isoneurum (Tiegh.) Vink – northern and north-central New Caledonia
  - Zygogynum amplexicaule subsp. luteum Vink – west-central and central New Caledonia
- Zygogynum baillonii Tiegh. – southeastern New Caledonia
- Zygogynum bicolor Tiegh. – central New Caledonia
- Zygogynum comptonii (Baker f.) Vink – northern New Caledonia
  - Zygogynum comptonii var. angustifolium Vink – west-central New Caledonia
  - Zygogynum comptonii var. comptonii – northern New Caledonia
  - Zygogynum comptonii var. taracticum Vink – west-central and central New Caledonia
- Zygogynum crassifolium (Baill.) Vink
- Zygogynum cristatum Vink – central New Caledonia
- Zygogynum fraterculus Vink
- Zygogynum mackeei Vink – northern New Caledonia
  - Zygogynum mackeei subsp. mackeei – northern New Caledonia
  - Zygogynum mackeei subsp. paniense Carlquist – northern New Caledonia (Mt. Panié)
- Zygogynum oligostigma Vink – central New Caledonia
- Zygogynum pancheri (Baill.) Vink – east-central and southeastern New Caledonia
  - Zygogynum pancheri subsp. arrhantum Vink – central and southeastern New Caledonia
  - Zygogynum pancheri subsp. deplanchei (Tiegh.) Vink – northern New Caledonia
  - Zygogynum pancheri subsp. elegans Vink – central and southeastern New Caledonia
  - Zygogynum pancheri subsp. pancheri – east-central and southeastern New Caledonia
  - Zygogynum pancheri subsp. rivulare (Vieill. ex P.Parm.) Vink – northern and central New Caledonia
- Zygogynum pauciflorum (Baker f.) Vink – northern New Caledonia (Mt. Panié)
- Zygogynum pomiferum Baill. – northern and central New Caledonia
  - Zygogynum pomiferum subsp. balansae (Tiegh.) Vink – southeastern New Caledonia
  - Zygogynum pomiferum subsp. pomiferum – northern and central New Caledonia
- Zygogynum schlechteri (Guillaumin) Vink – southeastern New Caledonia
- Zygogynum stipitatum Baill. – northern and central New Caledonia
- Zygogynum tanyostigma Vink – northern New Caledonia (Mt. Panié)
- Zygogynum tieghemii Vink – central and southeastern New Caledonia
  - Zygogynum tieghemii subsp. synchronanthum Vink – northwestern New Caledonia
  - Zygogynum tieghemii subsp. thulium Vink – northern New Caledonia
  - Zygogynum tieghemii subsp. tieghemii – central and southeastern New Caledonia
- Zygogynum vieillardii Baill. – central and southeastern New Caledonia
- Zygogynum vinkii F.B.Sampson – central New Caledonia

== Xeronemataceae ==
- Xeronema moorei Brongn. & Gris

== Xyridaceae ==
- Xyris desquamata J.R.Morel & Munzinger
- Xyris neocaledonica Rendle – east-central and southern New Caledonia
- Xyris pancheri Rendle – southern New Caledonia
