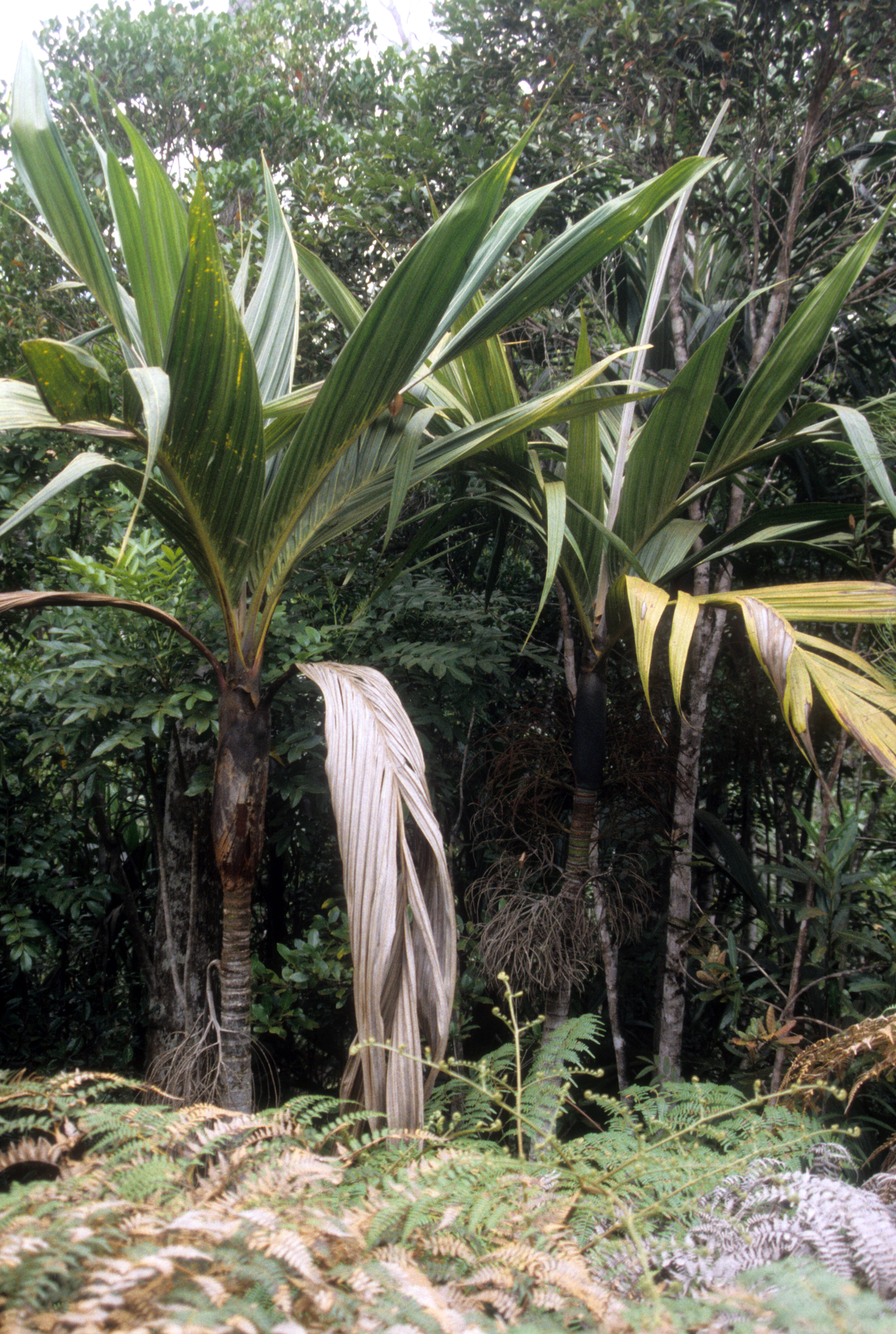

Conservation status
- Least Concern (IUCN 3.1)

Scientific classification
- Kingdom: Plantae
- Clade: Embryophytes
- Clade: Tracheophytes
- Clade: Spermatophytes
- Clade: Angiosperms
- Clade: Monocots
- Clade: Commelinids
- Order: Arecales
- Family: Arecaceae
- Genus: Basselinia
- Species: B. pancheri

Binomial name
- Basselinia pancheri (Brongn. & Gris) Vieill.

Synonyms
- Clinostigma pancheri (Brongn. & Gris) Becc.; Cyphokentia pancheri (Brongn. & Gris) Brongn.; Kentia pancheri Brongn. & Gris; Microkentia pancheri (Brongn. & Gris) H.Wendl. ex Salomon; Nephrocarpus schlechteri Dammer

= Basselinia pancheri =

Species of flowering plant

Basselinia pancheri is a species of flowering plant in the family Arecaceae. It is a palm tree endemic to New Caledonia.

Basselinia pancheri was first described in 1864, and received its current name in 1873. The IUCN lists the species as of Least Concern.

== Taxonomy ==
The species was first described as Kentia pancheri in 1864, by Adolphe-Théodore Brongniart and Jean Antoine Arthur Gris. It has also been placed in Cyphokentia and Clinostigma. The current name of the species was first used by Eugène Vieillard in 1873.

== Distribution ==
Basselinia pancheri is native to west and south New Caledonia, and grows throughout Grande Terre. It is more common in the south. The species' estimated extent of occurrence is 12,413 square kilometres (4,793 sq mi).

The species is found in dense humid forests, and in shrublands. It grows in serpentine soil, at elevations of 96–1,100 metres (315–3,609 ft).

== Description ==
Basselinia pancheri is a palm tree that grows up to 15 metres (49 ft) high. It grows in the subcanopy, or emerges above the canopy, and is a dominant species in disturbed forests.

The trees are solitary, or rarely grow in clusters.

== Uses ==
Basselinia pancheri seeds are sold to the international horticultural trade.

== Conservation ==
In 2016, the IUCN listed Basselinia pancheri as of Least Concern. Some subpopulations are affected by mining and fires.

Basselinia pancheri is legally protected in Province Nord, and occurs in protected areas, including Mont Panié and Blue River Provincial Park.
