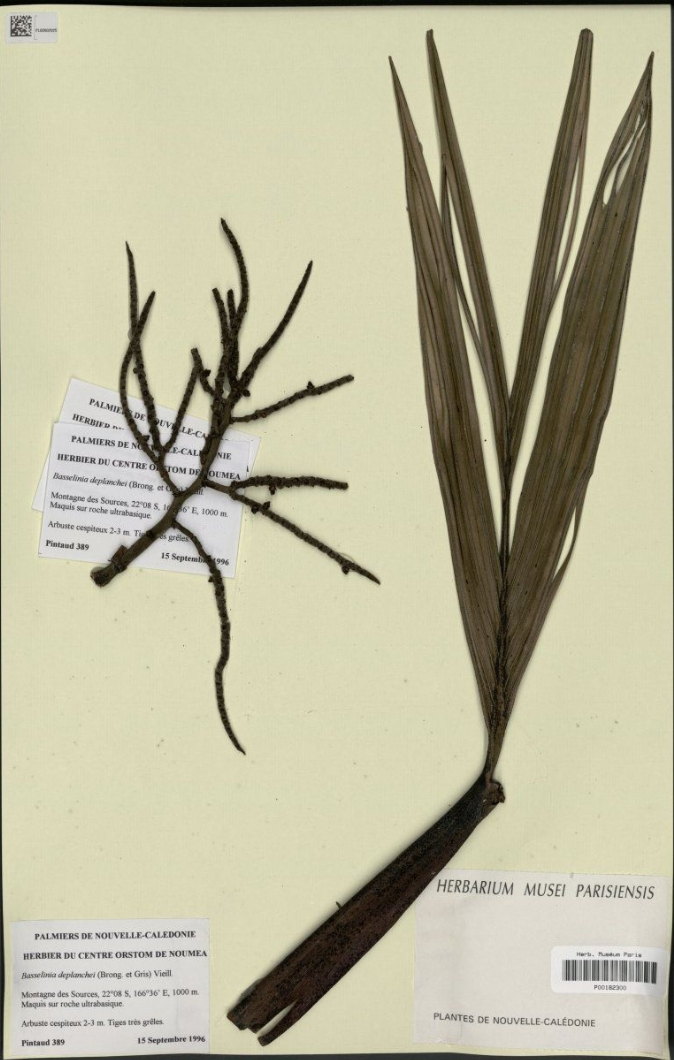

Conservation status
- Near Threatened (IUCN 3.1)

Scientific classification
- Kingdom: Plantae
- Clade: Embryophytes
- Clade: Tracheophytes
- Clade: Spermatophytes
- Clade: Angiosperms
- Clade: Monocots
- Clade: Commelinids
- Order: Arecales
- Family: Arecaceae
- Genus: Basselinia
- Species: B. deplanchei

Binomial name
- Basselinia deplanchei (Brongn. & Gris) Vieill.

Synonyms
- Clinostigma deplanchei (Brongn. & Gris) Becc.; Cyphokentia deplanchei (Brongn. & Gris) Brongn.; Kentia deplanchei Brongn. & Gris; Microkentia deplanchei (Brongn. & Gris) H.Wendl. ex Salomon; Basselinia surculosa (Brongn.) Becc.; Clinostigma surculosum (Brongn.) Becc.; Cyphokentia surculosa Brongn.; Microkentia schlechteri Dammer; Microkentia surculosa (Brongn.) H.Wendl. ex Salomon

= Basselinia deplanchei =

Species of flowering plant

Basselinia deplanchei is a species of flowering plant in the family Arecaceae. It is a palm tree endemic to New Caledonia.

Basselinia deplanchei was first described in 1864. The IUCN lists the species as Near Threatened. It may affected by habitat damage, and by the harvesting of juvenile trees.

== Taxonomy ==
The species was first described as Kentia deplanchei, by Adolphe-Théodore Brongniart and Jean Antoine Arthur Gris, in 1864. It was subsequently placed in other genera, including Cyphokentia and Clinostigma. In 1873, Eugène Vieillard gave the species its current name.

== Distribution ==
Basselinia deplanchei is native to the wet tropical biome of New Caledonia. It is present in east-central and south-east Grande Terre.

The species is found in low montane forests, on bare hills and slopes, and in exposed areas of vegetation. It grows at elevations of 200–1,500 metres (660–4,920 ft), in full sun.

== Description ==
Basselinia deplanchei is a slender palm tree. It usually grows in the understory, or emerges above the canopy.

== Conservation ==
In 2016, the IUCN assessed Basselinia deplanchei as Near Threatened. The population size is unknown, and it is estimated to occur in thirteen locations.

The speacies may be threatened by habitat damage caused by mining, and uncontrolled fires. Juvenile trees may also be harvested illegally for the horticultural trade.

The species is legally protected in North Province. It occurs in protected areas, including Blue River Provincial Park, Mount Humboldt, and Mont Panié.
