= Basselinia gracilis =

Conservation status
- Endangered (IUCN 3.1)

Scientific classification
- Kingdom: Plantae
- Clade: Embryophytes
- Clade: Tracheophytes
- Clade: Spermatophytes
- Clade: Angiosperms
- Clade: Monocots
- Clade: Commelinids
- Order: Arecales
- Family: Arecaceae
- Genus: Basselinia
- Species: B. gracilis

Binomial name
- Basselinia gracilis (Brongn. & Gris) Vieill.

Synonyms
- Synonymy: Clinostigma gracile (Brongn. & Gris) Becc.; Cyphokentia gracilis (Brongn. & Gris) Brongn.; Kentia gracilis Brongn. & Gris; Microkentia gracilis (Brongn. & Gris) H.Wendl. ex Salomon; Basselinia billardierei (Brongn.) Becc.; Basselinia heterophylla Becc.; Clinostigma billardierei Becc.; Clinostigma eriostachys Becc.; Cyphokentia billardierei Brongn.; Kentia concinna T.Moore in Gard.; Microkentia billardierei (Brongn.) H.Wendl. ex Salomon; Microkentia heterophylla Becc. ex Daniker

Species of flowering plant

Basselinia gracilis is a species of flowering plant in the family Arecaceae. It is a palm tree endemic to New Caledonia.

Basselinia gracilis was first described in 1864, and received its current name in 1873. The IUCN lists the species as endangered. It is used in horticulture.

== Taxonomy ==
Basselinia gracilis was first described in 1864, as Kentia gracilis, by Adolphe-Théodore Brongniart and Jean Antoine Arthur Gris. The species has been placed in several genera, including Clinostigma and Cyphokentia. Its current name was first published in 1873.

== Distribution ==
Basselinia gracilis is native to the wet tropical biome, and is endemic to New Caledonia. It grows in two locations in the north-east of Grande Terre. Its extent of occurrence is 8 square kilometres (3.1 sq mi).

The species grows in humid forests, on schist soils, at altitudes of 500–1,000 metres (1,600–3,300 ft).

== Description ==
Basselinia gracilis is a small palm tree.

== Uses ==
Basselinia gracilis seeds are sold in the international horticultural trade. The species is used as an ornamental plant.

== Conservation ==
In 2016, the IUCN assessed as Basselinia gracilis as Endangered. The species is threatened by rats, which destroy its seeds, and wild pigs, which damage its habitat. The sale of seeds to the horticultural trade may also be a threat.
