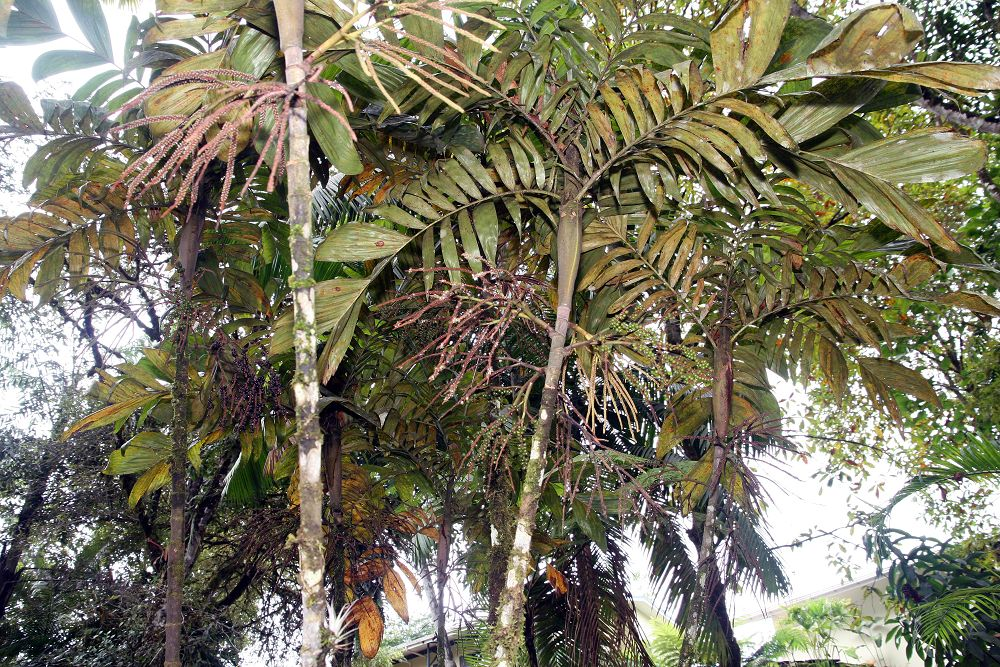

Conservation status
- Least Concern (IUCN 3.1)

Scientific classification
- Kingdom: Plantae
- Clade: Embryophytes
- Clade: Tracheophytes
- Clade: Spermatophytes
- Clade: Angiosperms
- Clade: Monocots
- Clade: Commelinids
- Order: Arecales
- Family: Arecaceae
- Genus: Basselinia
- Species: B. eriostachys

Binomial name
- Basselinia eriostachys Becc.

Synonyms
- Cyphokentia eriostachys Brongn.; Microkentia eriostachys (Brongn.) H.Wendl. ex Salomon

= Basselinia eriostachys =

Species of flowering plant

Basselinia eriostachys is a species of flowering plant in the family Arecaceae. It is a palm tree endemic to New Caledonia.

Basselinia eriostachys was described in 1873, and was moved to the genus Basselinia in 1920. The species has been assessed as Least Concern by the IUCN. The seeds are collected for horticulture.

== Taxonomy ==
The species was first described in 1873, by Adolphe-Théodore Brongniart, as Cyphokentia eriostachys. The species was moved from Cyphokentia to Microkentia in 1887. In 1920, Odoardo Beccari moved the species to Basselinia.

== Distribution ==
Basselinia eriostachys is native to the wet tropical biome of New Caledonia. The species grows throughout Grande Terre. Its estimated extent of occurrence is 5,687 square kilometres (2,196 sq mi).

The species grows on schist soils, or ultramafic substrate, at elevations of up to 1,200 metres (3,900 ft).

== Description ==
Basselinia eriostachys is a shrubby palm tree. It grows in the understory, or emerges from the canopy.

== Uses ==
Basselinia eriostachys seeds are collected, and sold in international horticultural trade.

== Conservation ==
In 2016, the IUCN listed Basselinia eriostachys as of Least Concern. It is abundant in its native range, and faces no major threats.

Some subpopulations may be affected by wild pigs, rats, and fire.
