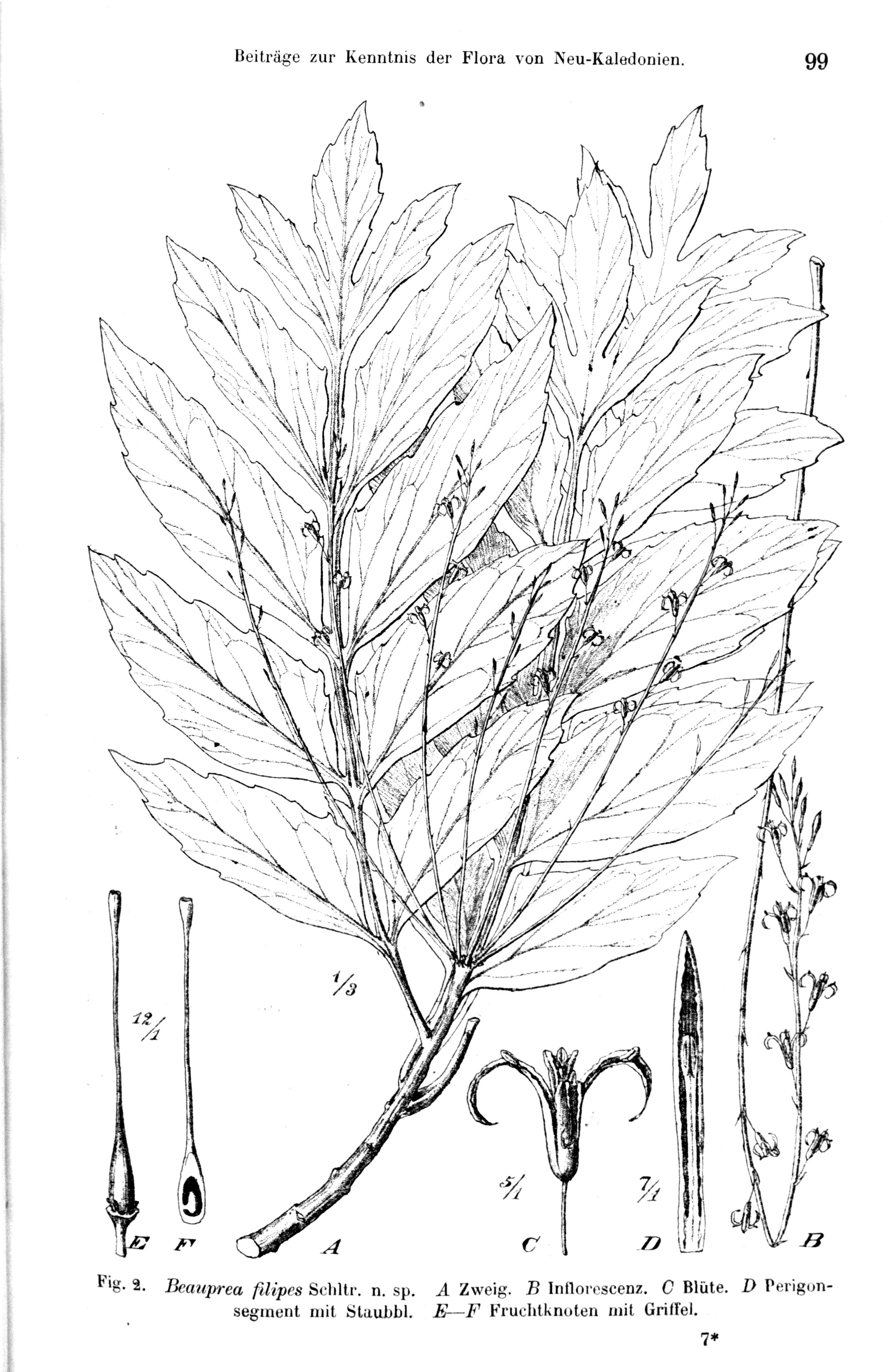
- Beauprea filipes

Scientific classification
- Kingdom: Plantae
- Clade: Embryophytes
- Clade: Tracheophytes
- Clade: Angiosperms
- Clade: Eudicots
- Order: Proteales
- Family: Proteaceae
- Subfamily: Proteoideae
- Genus: Beauprea; Brongn. & Gris

= Beauprea =

Genus of flowering plants

Beauprea is a genus of flowering plants in the family Proteaceae. Its 13 extant species are endemic to New Caledonia, though closely related forms have been found in the fossil records of Australia and New Zealand. Its closest extant relatives are the African Protea and Faurea.

== Species ==
Described species include:

- Beauprea asplenioides Schltr.
- Beauprea balansae Brongn. & Gris
- Beauprea comptonii S.Moore
- Beauprea congesta Virot
- Beauprea crassifolia Virot
- Beauprea filipes Schltr.
- Beauprea gracilis Brongn. & Gris
- Beauprea montana (Brongn. & Gris) Virot
- Beauprea montis-fontium Guillaumin
- Beauprea neglecta Virot
- Beauprea pancheri Brongn. & Gris
- Beauprea penariensis Guillaumin
- Beauprea spathulaefolia Brongn. & Gris
