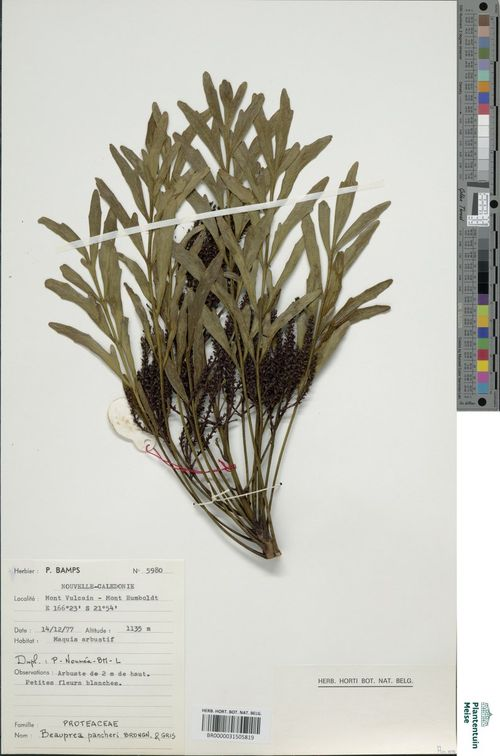

Scientific classification
- Kingdom: Plantae
- Clade: Embryophytes
- Clade: Tracheophytes
- Clade: Spermatophytes
- Clade: Angiosperms
- Clade: Eudicots
- Order: Proteales
- Family: Proteaceae
- Genus: Beauprea
- Species: B. pancheri

Binomial name
- Beauprea pancheri Brongn. & Gris

= Beauprea pancheri =

Species of flowering plant

Beauprea pancheri is a species of shrub or tree in the family Proteaceae. It is native to New Caledonia, and was described in 1872.

== Distribution ==
Beauprea pancheri is native to the wet tropical biome of central and south-east New Caledonia.

== Taxonomy ==
The species was described by Adolphe-Théodore Brongniart and Jean Antoine Arthur Gris in 1872.

== Description ==
Beauprea pancheri is a shrub or tree. It is around 2 metres (6.6 ft) high. The leaves are arranged alternately, are leathery in texture, and measure 20–28 centimetres (7.9–11.0 in) long. The inflorescences are 20–25 centimetres (7.9–9.8 in) long. The fruits are obovoid, and measure 7–8 millimetres (0.28–0.31 in) long.
