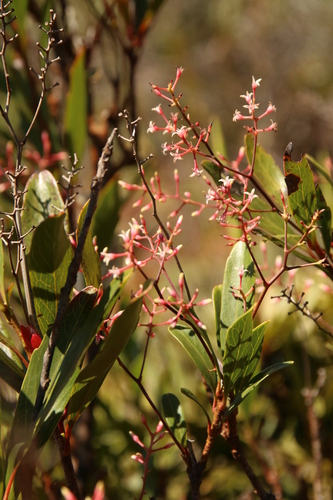

Conservation status
- Least Concern (IUCN 3.1)

Scientific classification
- Kingdom: Plantae
- Clade: Tracheophytes
- Clade: Angiosperms
- Clade: Eudicots
- Order: Proteales
- Family: Proteaceae
- Genus: Beauprea
- Species: B. gracilis

Binomial name
- Beauprea gracilis Brongn. & Gris

= Beauprea gracilis =

Species of flowering plant

Beauprea gracilis is a species of flowering plant in the family Proteaceae. It is a shrub or tree, found in the forests and shrublands of New Caledonia. The species is common, and classified as of Least Concern.

Adolphe-Théodore Brongniart and Jean Antoine Arthur Gris named and described the species in 1872.

== Distribution ==
Beauprea gracilis is endemic to the wet tropical biome of New Caledonia. It is found in forests and maquis shrubland, in the south-east and north-west of Grande Terre. The species occurs across an area of around 9,238 square kilometres (3,567 sq mi), at elevations from 5–850 metres (16–2,789 ft).

== Description ==
Beauprea gracilis is a shrub or tree that grows 1–5 metres (3.3–16.4 ft) high.

The branches are smooth. The leaves are leathery, and arranged alternately. The fruits are ellipsoid, and measure 1.5 centimetres (0.59 in) long.

== Conservation ==
In 2021, the IUCN assessed Beauprea gracilis as of Least Concern. The species is common, although some subpopulations may be affected by mining. It is not legally protected, and does not occur in any protected areas.
