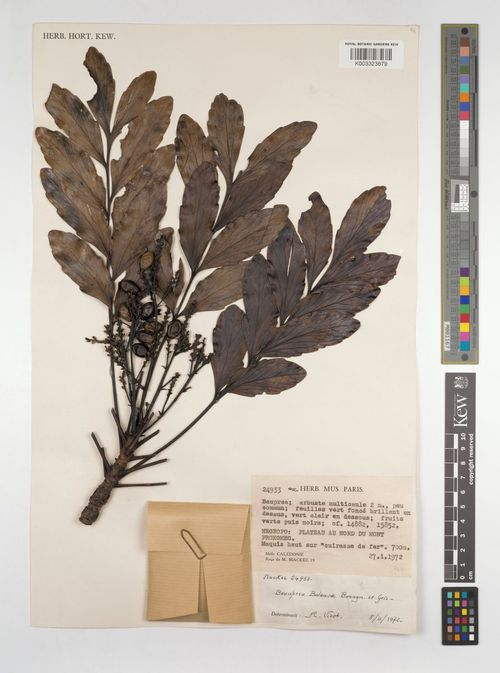

Conservation status
- Vulnerable (IUCN 3.1)

Scientific classification
- Kingdom: Plantae
- Clade: Tracheophytes
- Clade: Angiosperms
- Clade: Eudicots
- Order: Proteales
- Family: Proteaceae
- Genus: Beauprea
- Species: B. balansae

Binomial name
- Beauprea balansae Brongn. & Gris

Synonyms
- Polypodiopsis muelleri Carrière

= Beauprea balansae =

Species of flowering plant

Beauprea balansae is a species of flowering plant in the family Proteaceae. It is a shrub or small tree.

The species is endemic to New Caledonia, where it grows in forests and scrublands. It is listed as Vulnerable by the IUCN, and is at risk from mining and fires.

== Taxonomy ==
The species was described by Adolphe-Théodore Brongniart and Jean Antoine Arthur Gris in 1871.

== Distribution ==
Beauprea balansae is endemic to the wet tropical biome of central New Caledonia. It has a discontinuous distribution on the massifs of central and northwest Grande Terre, where it grows in humid forests and scrublands.

Beauprea balansae has an altitude range of 200–1,100 metres (660–3,610 ft). It occupies an area of 92 square kilometres (36 sq mi), and is estimated to occur in ten locations.

== Conservation ==
In 2021, Beauprea balansae was assessed as Vulnerable by the IUCN. Its habitat is at risk from mining and uncontrolled fires.

The species is legally protected in North Province, and occurs in the protected area of Côte Oubliée.
