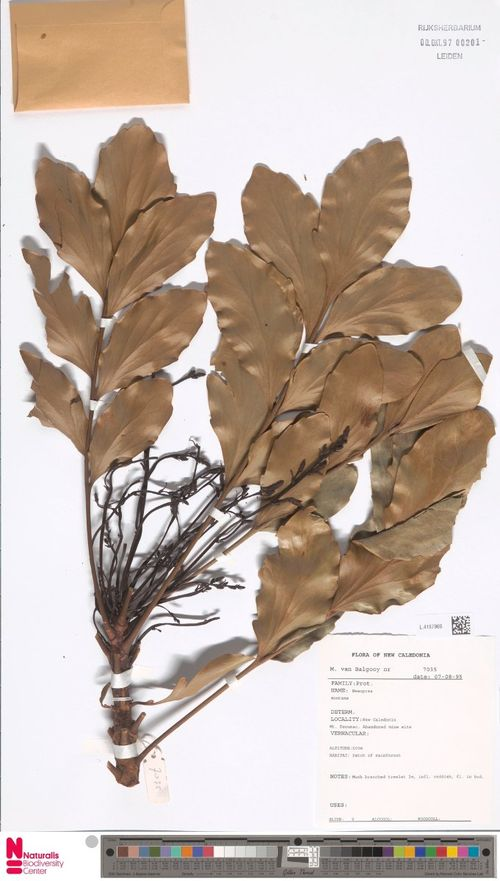

Conservation status
- Least Concern (IUCN 3.1)

Scientific classification
- Kingdom: Plantae
- Clade: Embryophytes
- Clade: Tracheophytes
- Clade: Spermatophytes
- Clade: Angiosperms
- Clade: Eudicots
- Order: Proteales
- Family: Proteaceae
- Genus: Beauprea
- Species: B. montana

Binomial name
- Beauprea montana (Brongn. & Gris) Virot

Synonyms
- Beauprea balansae var. montana Brongn. & Gris

= Beauprea montana =

Species of flowering plant

Beauprea montana is a species of flowering plant in the family Proteaceae. It is a shrub with white flowers. The species is endemic to the forests and shrublands of New Caledonia.

Beauprea montana was named in 1968. Its IUCN conservation status is Least Concern.

== Taxonomy ==
Robert Virot named the species in 1968. The holotype was collected on Mount Humboldt.

== Distribution ==
Beauprea montana is native to the wet tropical biome of central and south-east New Caledonia, and is mostly found in the south of Grande Terre. Its occurrence is 4,102 square kilometres (1,584 sq mi).

The species grows in forests and maquis shrublands, at altitudes of 150–1,200 metres (490–3,940 ft).

== Description ==
Beauprea montana is a shrub that grows 2–3 metres (6.6–9.8 ft) high. It has 14–40 centimetres (0.46–1.31 ft) inflorescences, with small white flowers.

== Conservation ==
In 2021, the IUCN assessed Beauprea montana as Least Concern. It is common, and occurs in several protected areas, including Mount Humboldt. Some subpopulations may be affected by mining and uncontrolled fires.
