= Beauprea spathulaefolia =

Scientific classification
- Kingdom: Plantae
- Clade: Embryophytes
- Clade: Tracheophytes
- Clade: Angiosperms
- Clade: Eudicots
- Order: Proteales
- Family: Proteaceae
- Genus: Beauprea
- Species: B. spathulaefolia

Binomial name
- Beauprea spathulaefolia Brongn. & Gris, 1871

Synonyms
- Beauprea diversifolia Brongn. & Gris; Beauprea elegans Brongn. & Gris ex Guillaumin

Species of flowering plant

Beauprea spathulaefolia is a species of flowering plants in the family Proteaceae. It is found in New Caledonia.
