= Clinosperma bractealis =

Scientific classification
- Kingdom: Plantae
- Clade: Tracheophytes
- Clade: Angiosperms
- Clade: Monocots
- Clade: Commelinids
- Order: Arecales
- Family: Arecaceae
- Genus: Clinosperma
- Species: C. bracteale

Binomial name
- Clinosperma bracteale (Brongn.) Becc.

Synonyms
- Clinosperma bracteale

Species of palm

Clinosperma bracteale is a species of palm tree in the palm family

The genus is named for two Greek words meaning 'slanted' and 'seed', and the species epithet comes from Latin and translates to 'with bracts', describing the inflorescence.

== Distribution ==
The tree is endemic to the Island of New Caledonia, in the Melanesia bioregion of the southwestern Pacific Ocean.

It is found in rain forests, growing in schists and serpentine soil.

== Description ==
Clinosperma bractealis is a solitary-trunked palm which grows up to 15 m tall at a uniform 10 cm width. The gray to tan trunks are ringed by leaf scars up to the unusual, 60 cm tall crownshaft, holding 12 - 15 pinnate leaves. At the base, the crownshaft bulges significantly to one side, giving it a distinct triangle shape. It is usually covered in a hairy tomentum as well as white wax and, depending on the concentration of each, may be brown to green to white in color.

Each leaf, recurving at its end, is 1.5 m long on 30 cm petioles being light to bright green in color. The stiff pinnae are once-folded with a prominent midrib, 90 cm long, and regularly arranged along the rachis.

The infrafoliar inflorescence produces small, white to yellow, unisexual flowers on bright red branches, basally divided to three orders and distally to one. The female flowers are nearly twice as long as the male's, both contain three distinct sepals and petals, the former with 3 staminodes, the latter with 6 stamens. The globose fruit ripen from shiny green to black, each with one light brown seed.
