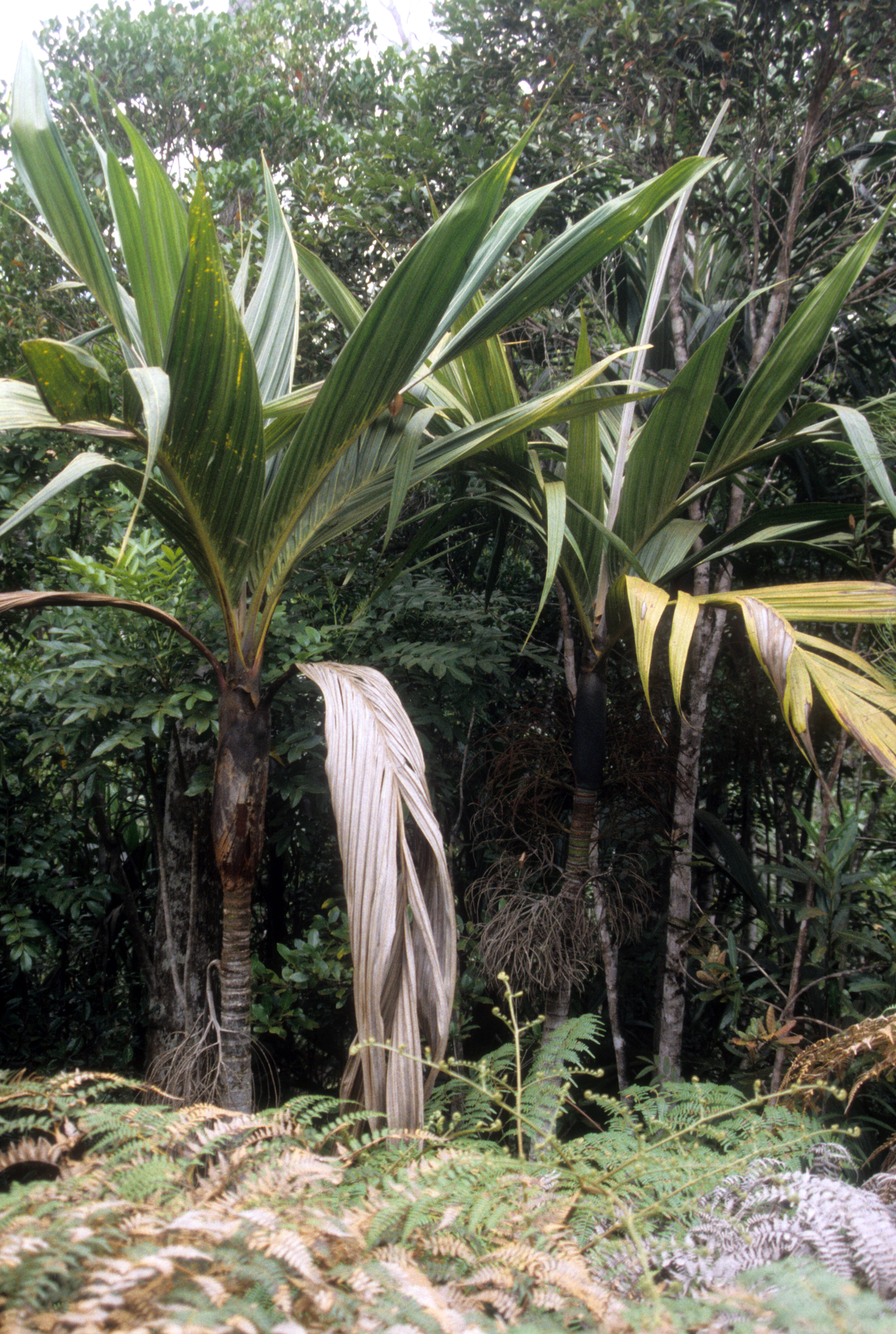
- Basselinia pancheri

Scientific classification
- Kingdom: Plantae
- Clade: Embryophytes
- Clade: Tracheophytes
- Clade: Spermatophytes
- Clade: Angiosperms
- Clade: Monocots
- Clade: Commelinids
- Order: Arecales
- Family: Arecaceae
- Subfamily: Arecoideae
- Tribe: Areceae
- Subtribe: Basseliniinae
- Genus: Basselinia; Vieill.

Synonyms
- Microkentia H.Wendl. ex Hook.f.; Nephrocarpus Dammer; Alloschmidia H.E.Moore

= Basselinia =

Genus of palms

Basselinia is a genus of flowering plant in the family Arecaceae. The entire genus is endemic to the Island of New Caledonia in the Pacific. In some (but not all) molecular phylogenetic analyses, Hedyscepe from Lord Howe Island is nested in Basselinia.

== List of species ==
Sixteen species are accepted as of June 2026:

- Basselinia deplanchei (Brongn. & Gris) Vieill
- Basselinia eriostachys (Brongn.) Becc.
- Basselinia favieri H.E.Moore
- Basselinia glabrata Becc.
- Basselinia gracilis (Brongn. & Gris) Vieill.
- Basselinia humboldtiana (Brongn.) H.E.Moore
- Basselinia iterata H.E.Moore
- Basselinia moorei Pintaud & F.W.Stauffer
- Basselinia pancheri (Brongn. & Gris) Vieill
- Basselinia pendulina Hodel & Pierson
- Basselinia porphyrea H.E.Moore
- Basselinia pseudovelutina Hodel & Pierson
- Basselinia sordida H.E.Moore
- Basselinia tomentosa Becc.
- Basselinia velutina Becc.
- Basselinia vestita H.E.Moore
