= Cyphokentia macrostachya =

Scientific classification
- Kingdom: Plantae
- Clade: Tracheophytes
- Clade: Angiosperms
- Clade: Monocots
- Clade: Commelinids
- Order: Arecales
- Family: Arecaceae
- Genus: Cyphokentia
- Species: C. macrostachya

Binomial name
- Cyphokentia macrostachya Brongn.

Species of palm

Cyphokentia macrostachya is a species of palm endemic to New Caledonia.

== Description ==
The yellow, green or gray solitary trunks reach over 15 m in height at a 20 cm diameter, slightly bulging at the base. The leaves meet the trunk with a 1 m, slightly bulging crownshaft covered in tomentum and scales, giving it a brown to gray to white color. The pinnate leaves extend from 60 cm petioles at a 3 m length, recurved and bright green in color. The leaflets are over a meter long, obliquely acute, with one fold along a prominent midrib.

The branched inflorescence grows beneath the leaf crown, circling the trunk, producing tiny branches of male and female flowers. The male flowers have three sepals, three petals and six stamens, with three petals, three sepals, and three staminodes in the females. The ovoid fruit ripen to a bright red color, containing one ellipsoidal seed.

== Distribution and habitat ==
Cyphokentia macrostachya grows in New Caledonian rain forest, from sea level to 900 m in elevation in free draining, schistose soil. They are not tolerant of frost and usually grow in filtered light or shade until they reach the canopy top in their later life.
