= Basselinia pseudovelutina =

Scientific classification
- Kingdom: Plantae
- Clade: Embryophytes
- Clade: Tracheophytes
- Clade: Spermatophytes
- Clade: Angiosperms
- Clade: Monocots
- Clade: Commelinids
- Order: Arecales
- Family: Arecaceae
- Genus: Basselinia
- Species: B. pseudovelutina

Binomial name
- Basselinia pseudovelutina Hodel & Pierson

Species of flowering plant

Basselinia pseudovelutina is a species of flowering plant in the family Arecaceae. It is a tree native to New Caledonia.

The species was described in 2024, and named in reference to its similarity to Basselinia velutina.

== Taxonomy ==
The species was described in 2024, by Donald Robert Hodel and Gilles Pierson. The type specimen is a cultivated plant that was collected in 2024, from Mount Koghi, Dumbéa, New Caledonia.

== Distribution ==
Basselinia pseudovelutina is native to the wet tropical biome of New Caledonia.

== Etymology ==
The specific epithet is derived from the greek Pseudo-, and velutina (referring to the species Basselinia velutina). It refers to the similarity of the two species, and the fact that they were previously confused.
