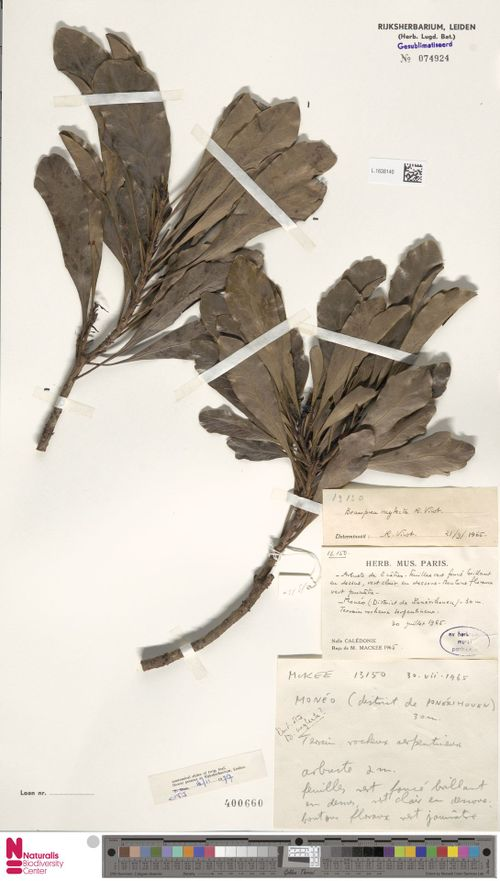

Scientific classification
- Kingdom: Plantae
- Clade: Embryophytes
- Clade: Tracheophytes
- Clade: Spermatophytes
- Clade: Angiosperms
- Clade: Eudicots
- Order: Proteales
- Family: Proteaceae
- Genus: Beauprea
- Species: B. neglecta

Binomial name
- Beauprea neglecta Virot

= Beauprea neglecta =

Species of flowering plant

Beauprea neglecta is a species of flowering plant in the family Proteaceae. It is a shrub or tree native to New Caledonia.

The species was described in 1968, by Robert Virot.

== Distribution ==
Beauprea neglecta is native to the wet tropical biome of New Caledonia. It is found in forests and maquis shrublands.

== Description ==
Beauprea neglecta is a shrub which grows 1–3 metres (3.3–9.8 ft) high, or a tree up to 6 metres (20 ft) high. It produces very small, white, fragrant flowers, on inflorescences that are 6–32 centimetres (2.4–12.6 in) long. The species is very similar to Beauprea spathulaefolia.
