= Basselinia humboldtiana =

Conservation status
- Near Threatened (IUCN 3.1)

Scientific classification
- Kingdom: Plantae
- Clade: Tracheophytes
- Clade: Angiosperms
- Clade: Monocots
- Clade: Commelinids
- Order: Arecales
- Family: Arecaceae
- Genus: Basselinia
- Species: B. humboldtiana

Binomial name
- Basselinia humboldtiana (Brongn.) H.E.Moore

Synonyms
- Clinostigma humboldtianum (Brongn.) Becc.; Cyphokentia humboldtiana Brongn.; Kentia humboldtiana (Brongn.) Brongn. ex H.Wendl., pro syn.

Species of palm

Basselinia humboldtiana is a species of flowering plant in the family Arecaceae. It is a palm tree found only in New Caledonia.
