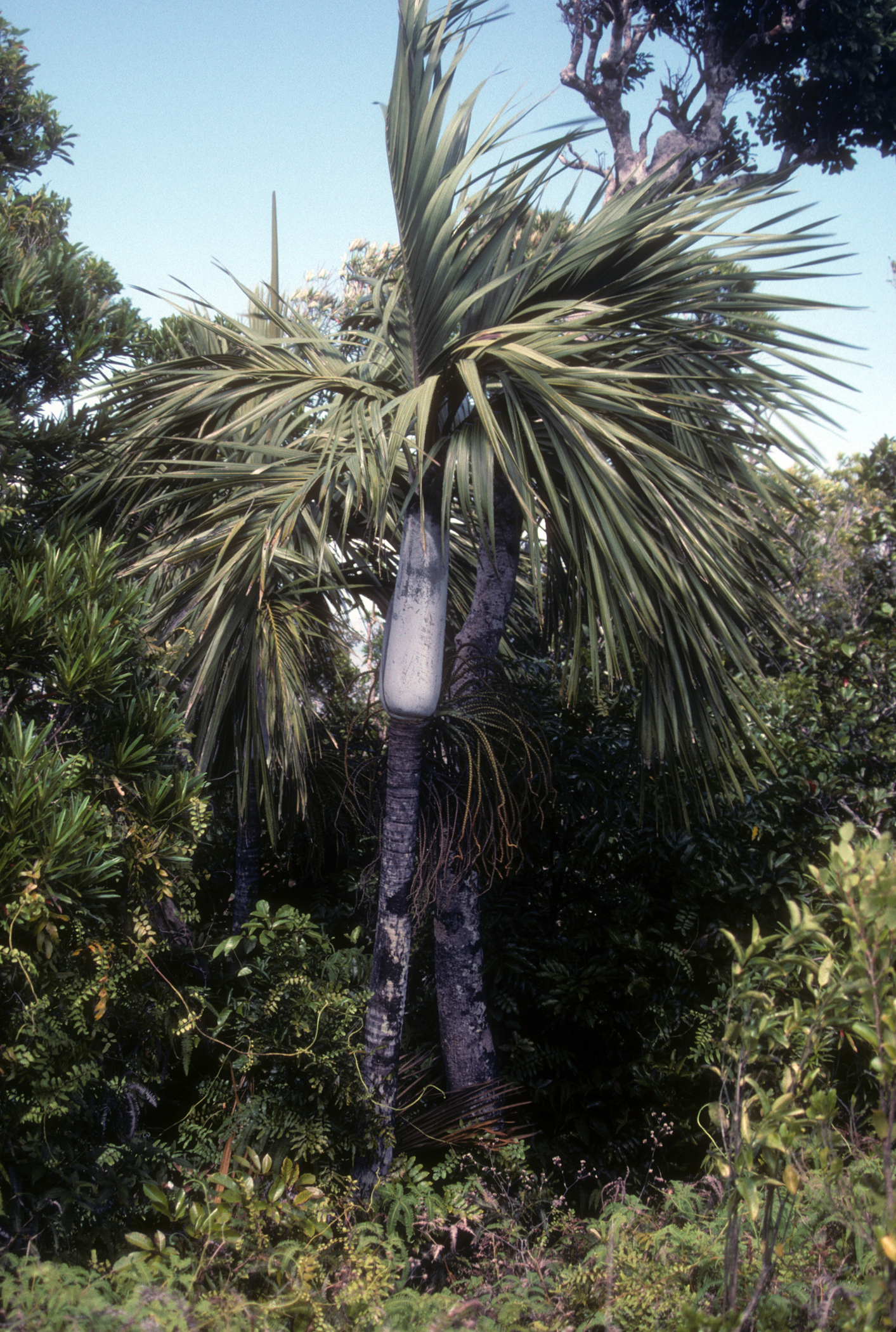
- Cyphokentia cerifera

Scientific classification
- Kingdom: Plantae
- Clade: Tracheophytes
- Clade: Angiosperms
- Clade: Monocots
- Clade: Commelinids
- Order: Arecales
- Family: Arecaceae
- Tribe: Areceae
- Subtribe: Clinospermatinae; J.Dransf., N.W.Uhl, Asmussen, W.J.Baker, M.M.Harley & C.E.Lewis

= Clinospermatinae =

Subtribe of palms

Clinospermatinae is a subtribe of plants in the family Arecaceae.

Genera:

- Cyphokentia
- Clinosperma
