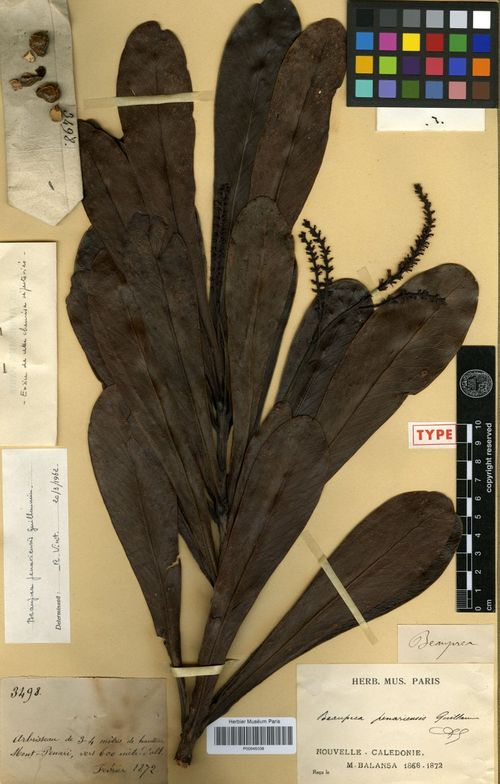
- Specimen collected by Benjamin Balansa

Conservation status
- Critically Endangered (IUCN 3.1)

Scientific classification
- Kingdom: Plantae
- Clade: Embryophytes
- Clade: Tracheophytes
- Clade: Spermatophytes
- Clade: Angiosperms
- Clade: Eudicots
- Order: Proteales
- Family: Proteaceae
- Genus: Beauprea
- Species: B. penariensis

Binomial name
- Beauprea penariensis Guillamin

= Beauprea penariensis =

Species of flowering plant

Beauprea penariensis is a species of flowering plant in the family Proteaceae. It is a shrub or tree with pear-shaped fruits.

The species is native to a small area of New Caledonia, and is known from fewer than fifty individual plants. It is listed as critically endangered by the IUCN.

Beauprea penariensis was described in 1935, by André Guillaumin.

== Distribution ==
Beauprea penariensis is endemic to the wet tropical biome of New Caledonia. The species grows in scrublands, at altitudes of 600–850 metres (1,970–2,790 ft). Its extent of occupancy and occurrence is around 4 square kilometres (1.5 sq mi)

In 1868, Benjamin Balansa collected a single specimen of the species from Mount Pénari. The specimen was taken to a herbarium in the south-east of Grande Terre. The species was known only from this specimen until 2019, when surveys located other specimens in a restricted area.

== Description ==
Beauprea penariensis is a shrub or tree. It grows 3–4 metres (9.8–13.1 ft) high. The branches are strong. The leaves are up to 23 centimetres (9.1 in) long, and 5 centimetres (2.0 in) wide. The fruits are pear shaped.

== Conservation ==
In 2021, the IUCN listed Beauprea penariensis as critically endangered. The species is threatened by habitat damage from uncontrolled bushfires. The population size is between three and forty-nine individual plants, and only three mature plants have been observed.

Beauprea penariensis is legally protected in North Province and South Province, but does not occur in protected areas.
