= Basselinia porphyrea =

Conservation status
- Endangered (IUCN 3.1)

Scientific classification
- Kingdom: Plantae
- Clade: Tracheophytes
- Clade: Angiosperms
- Clade: Monocots
- Clade: Commelinids
- Order: Arecales
- Family: Arecaceae
- Genus: Basselinia
- Species: B. porphyrea

Binomial name
- Basselinia porphyrea H.E.Moore

Species of palm

Basselinia porphyrea is a species of flowering plant in the family Arecaceae.

== Distribution and habitat ==
It is a palm tree endemic to New Caledonia. It is found in dense humid forests and shrublands on serpentinite soils, at elevations between 900 and 1,000 meters.
