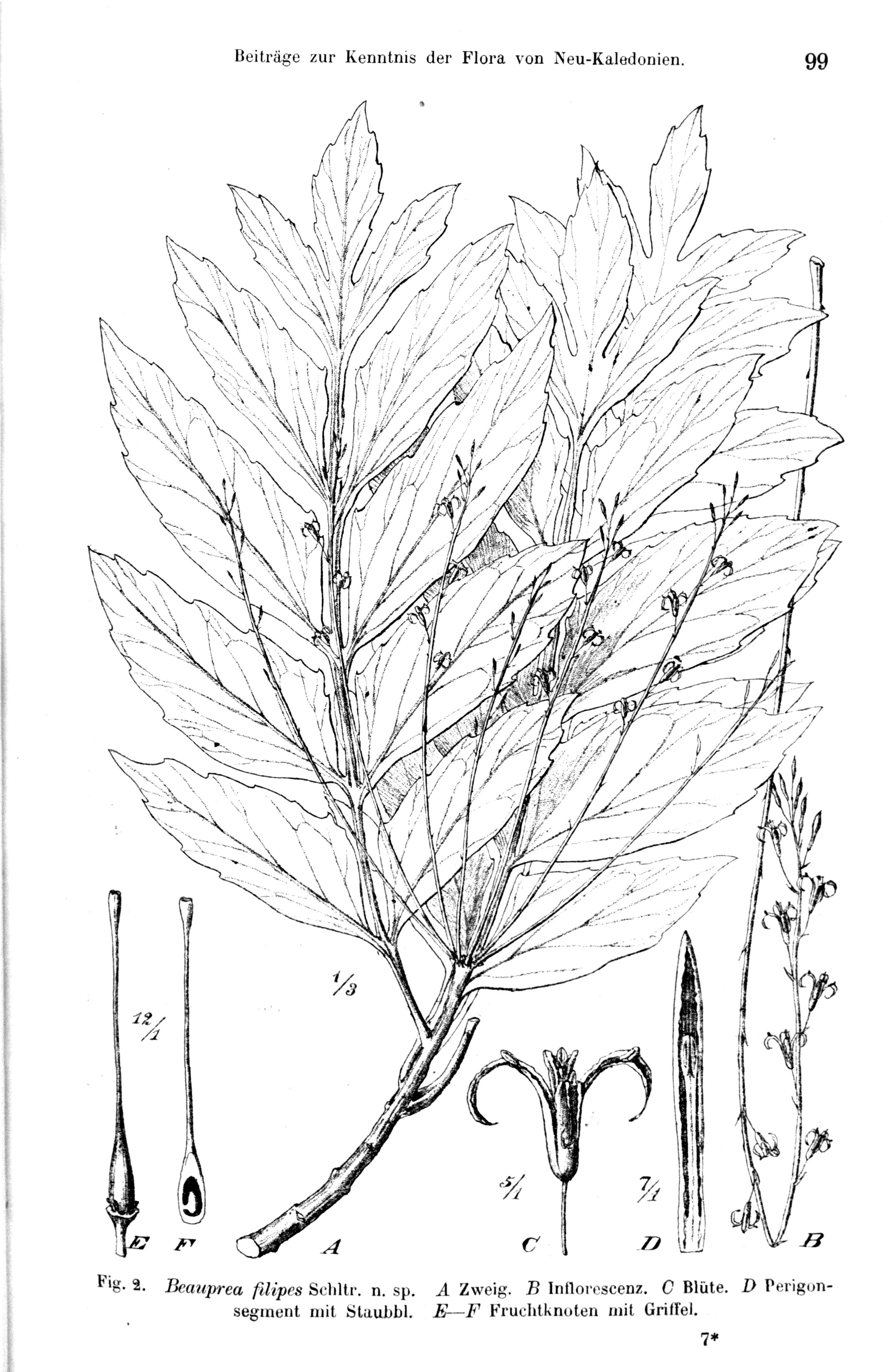

Conservation status
- Least Concern (IUCN 3.1)

Scientific classification
- Kingdom: Plantae
- Clade: Embryophytes
- Clade: Tracheophytes
- Clade: Spermatophytes
- Clade: Angiosperms
- Clade: Eudicots
- Order: Proteales
- Family: Proteaceae
- Genus: Beauprea
- Species: B. filipes

Binomial name
- Beauprea filipes Schltr.

= Beauprea filipes =

Species of flowering plant

Beauprea filipes is a species of shrub or tree in the family Proteaceae.

The species was described by Friedrich Richard Rudolf Schlechter in 1906. In French, its common name is Hêtre Blanc.

== Distribution ==
Beauprea filipes is endemic to the wet tropical biome of New Caledonia. It is common in forests and undergrowth across Grand Terre. The species is found at elevations of 150–950 metres (490–3,120 ft). Its estimated area of occupancy is 112 square kilometres (43 sq mi).

== Description ==
Beauprea filipes is a shrub or tree. It grows 1.5–2 metres (4.9–6.6 ft) in height.

== Conservation ==
In 2021, the IUCN assessed Beauprea filipes as of Least Concern. The species is not protected by legislation, but it is present in protected areas, including Mont Panié.
