= Basselinia vestita =

Conservation status
- Critically Endangered (IUCN 3.1)

Scientific classification
- Kingdom: Plantae
- Clade: Tracheophytes
- Clade: Angiosperms
- Clade: Monocots
- Clade: Commelinids
- Order: Arecales
- Family: Arecaceae
- Genus: Basselinia
- Species: B. vestita

Binomial name
- Basselinia vestita H.E.Moore

Species of palm

Basselinia vestita is a species of flowering plant in the family Arecaceae.

== Distribution and habitat ==
It is endemic to New Caledonia. It is found in dense, humid, low forests on serpentine soil at elevations between 800 and 950 meters.
