= Basselinia glabrata =

Conservation status
- Vulnerable (IUCN 3.1)

Scientific classification
- Kingdom: Plantae
- Clade: Tracheophytes
- Clade: Angiosperms
- Clade: Monocots
- Clade: Commelinids
- Order: Arecales
- Family: Arecaceae
- Genus: Basselinia
- Species: B. glabrata

Binomial name
- Basselinia glabrata Becc.

Synonyms
- Alloschmidia glabrata (Becc.) H.E.Moore

Species of palm

Basselinia glabrata is a species of palm tree endemic to New Caledonia. It was formerly placed in the genus Alloschmidia.
