= Clinosperma =

Scientific classification
- Kingdom: Plantae
- Clade: Tracheophytes
- Clade: Angiosperms
- Clade: Monocots
- Clade: Commelinids
- Order: Arecales
- Family: Arecaceae
- Subfamily: Arecoideae
- Tribe: Areceae
- Subtribe: Clinospermatinae
- Genus: Clinosperma; Becc., 1920

Synonyms
- Brongniartikentia Becc. Lavoixia H.E.Moore

Genus of palms

Clinosperma is a palm tree genus in the family Arecaceae.

The genus has 4 known species, all endemic to the Island of New Caledonia, in the Melanesia bioregion of the southwestern Pacific Ocean. Its closest relative is Cyphokentia, also endemic to New Caledonia, and the sole other genus of the subtribe Clinospermatinae.

== Species ==
- Clinosperma bractealis (Brongn.) Becc., Palme Nuova Caledonia: 52 (1920).
- Clinosperma lanuginosa (H.E.Moore) Pintaud & W.J.Baker, Kew Bull. 63: 69 (2008).
- Clinosperma macrocarpa (H.E.Moore) Pintaud & W.J.Baker, Kew Bull. 63: 70 (2008).
- Clinosperma vaginata (Brongn.) Pintaud & W.J.Baker, Kew Bull. 63: 70 (2008).
