= Basselinia pendulina =

Scientific classification
- Kingdom: Plantae
- Clade: Embryophytes
- Clade: Tracheophytes
- Clade: Spermatophytes
- Clade: Angiosperms
- Clade: Monocots
- Clade: Commelinids
- Order: Arecales
- Family: Arecaceae
- Genus: Basselinia
- Species: B. pendulina

Binomial name
- Basselinia pendulina Hodel & Pierson

Species of flowering plant

Basselinia pendulina is a species of flowering plant in the family Arecaceae. It is a tree native to New Caledonia.

The species was described in 2024, and named after its inflorescences, which hang down against the trunk.

== Taxonomy ==
Basselinia pendulina was first described in 2024, by Donald Robert Hodel and Gilles Pierson.

The type material, a cultivated plant, was collected in 2024. It was found on Mount Koghi, in southern Dumbéa, New Caledonia.

== Distribution ==
Basselinia pendulina is native to the wet tropical biome of New Caledonia.

== Etymology ==
The specific epithet is derived from the Latin pendulinus ("hanging down"). It refers to the inflorescences, which hang down against the trunk.
