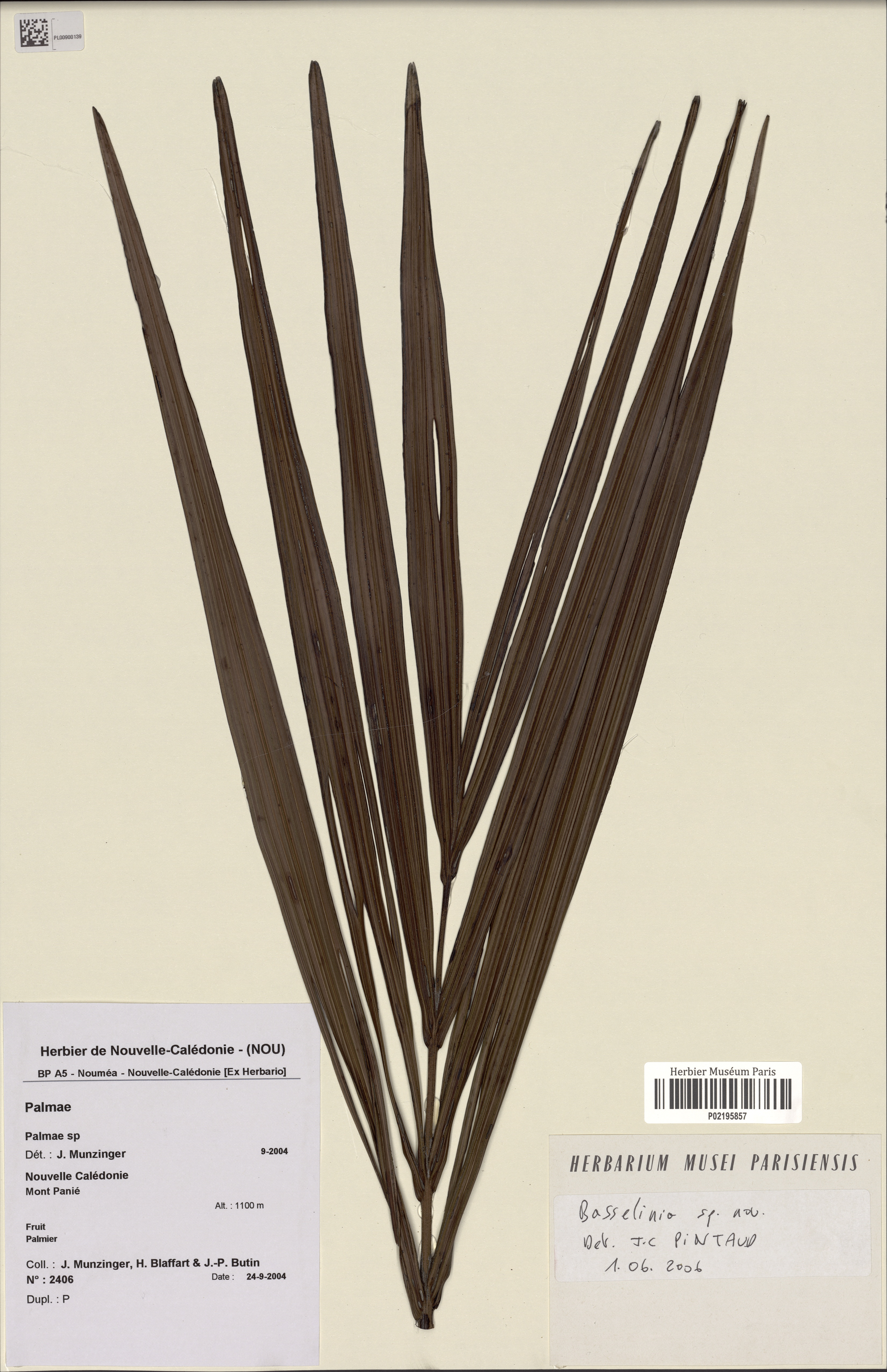

Conservation status
- Critically Endangered (IUCN 3.1)

Scientific classification
- Kingdom: Plantae
- Clade: Embryophytes
- Clade: Tracheophytes
- Clade: Spermatophytes
- Clade: Angiosperms
- Clade: Monocots
- Clade: Commelinids
- Order: Arecales
- Family: Arecaceae
- Genus: Basselinia
- Species: B. moorei

Binomial name
- Basselinia moorei Pintaud & F.W.Stauffer

= Basselinia moorei =

Species of flowering plant

Basselinia moorei is a species of flowering plant in the family Arecaceae. It is a palm tree endemic to New Caledonia.

The species was described in 2011, and is listed as Critically Endangered by the IUCN. Its seeds are sold in the horticultural trade.

== Taxonomy ==
Basselinia moorei was described in 2011, by Jean-Christophe Pintaud and Fred Walter Stauffer. The holotype was collected from Mont Panié, at an elevation of 1,080 metres (3,540 ft), in 1978.

== Distribution ==
The species is native to the wet tropical biome of New Caledonia. It is known only from the slopes of Mont Panié, and grows at elevations of 900–1,400 metres (3,000–4,600 ft). Its estimated extent of occurrence is 4 square kilometres (1.5 sq mi).

The species grows in dense, humid forests, on schist rocks.

== Description ==
Basselinia moorei is a palm tree. Each plant has separate male and female flowers (monoecy).

== Uses ==
Basselinia moorei seeds are sold in horticultural trade.

== Conservation ==
In 2016, the IUCN assessed Basselinia moorei as Critically Endangered. The population is declining, and only one subpopulation is known. The main threats to the species are seed collection for horticulture, seed predation by rats, and habitat destruction caused by wild pigs.

Basselinia moorei occurs in Mont Panié, which is a protected area. It is legally protected in Province Nord.
