= Hippolyte Sebert =

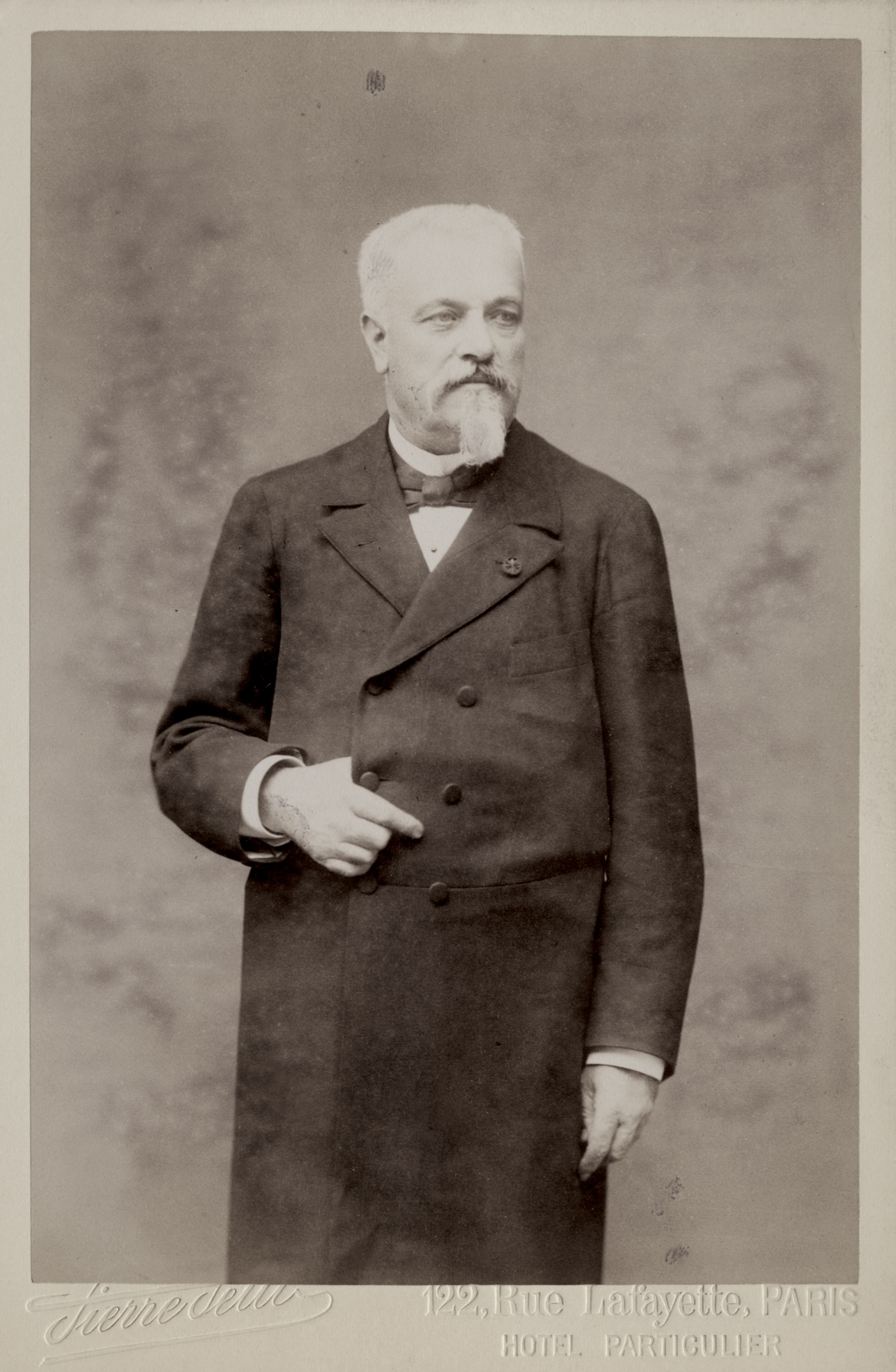
In 1905

Hippolyte Sebert (30 January 1839 – 23 January 1930) was a French army general, scientist, and after World War I he was into internationalism and the promotion of Esperanto. Among his many interests was a universal bibliography, photography, and botany.

== Life and work ==
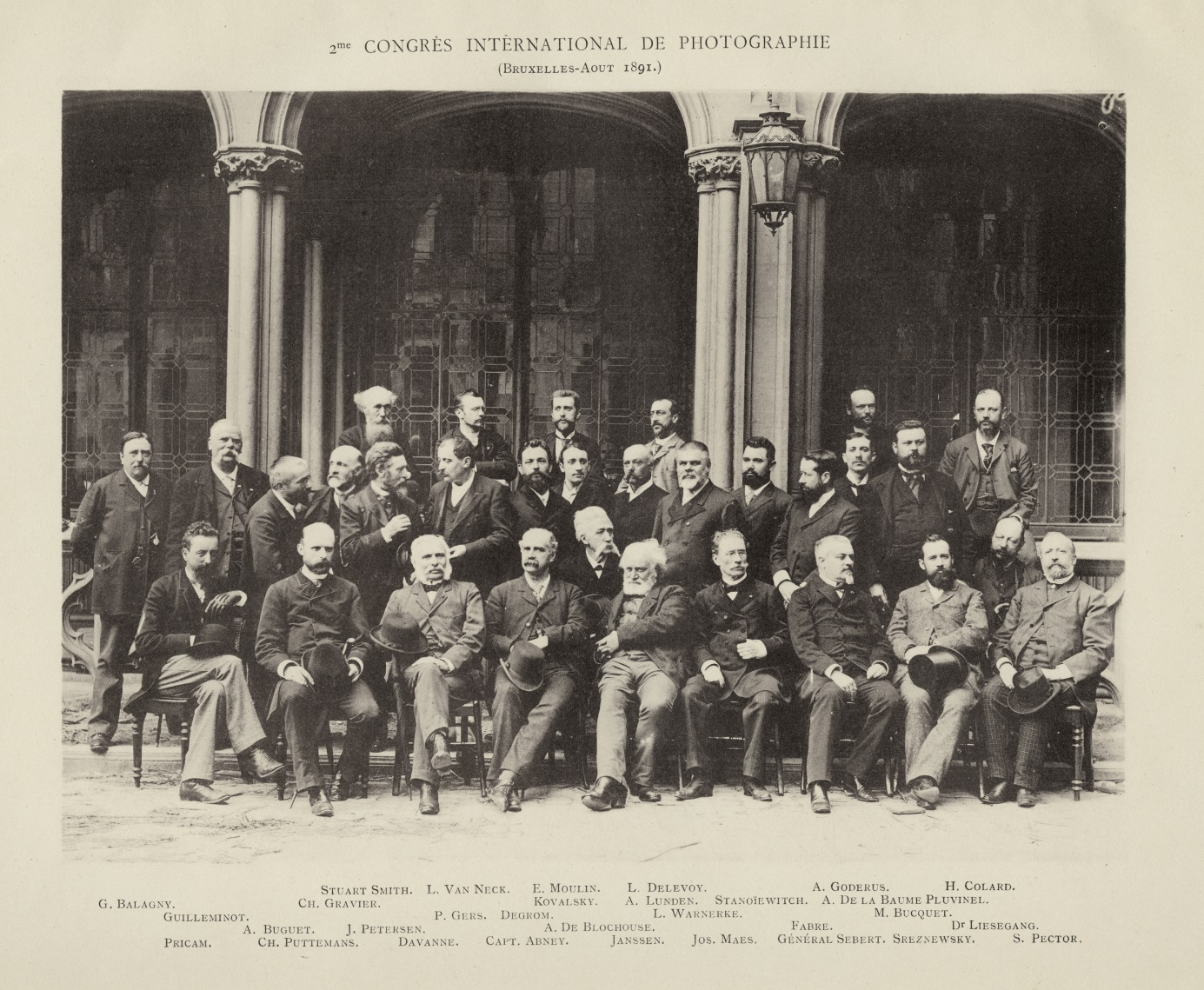
In 1891 at the second international congress of photography. Seated third from right.

Sebert was born in Verberie, he studied in Douai and joined the Ecole Polytechnique in 1858. He graduated in 1860 as a marine artillery officer and was posted to Toulon where he examined the expansion of explosives used in cannons. He worked in New Caledonia from 1866 to 1870 in the marine artillery office and began to study the mechanical properties of trees. In the process he also described the plant genus Cerberiopsis. Ilex sebertii was named after him by J.A.I. Pancher. In 1870 he served in the defense of Paris and served as aide-de-camp to General Frebault. In 1899 Sebert gave testimony in the trial of Dreyfus and helped exonerate him.

Sebert joined the Société d'Encouragement pour l’industrie Nationale (SEIN) in 1874. He was interested in creating a universal bibliography of technical literature. After Sebert's death, the Bureau Bibliographique de Paris (BBP) that he helped found in 1899 along with Paul Otlet, who was also an Esperantist, was led by Eugene Morel. The organization transformed in 1944 to the Association d'Information Documentaire. Sebert also considered pictures as an international medium of communication and was interested in photography. He headed the board of the French Society of Photography (Société française de photographie) and in 1906, Sebert presided over the International Congress of Photographic Documentation in Marseille. He sought the creation of collections of photographs akin to libraries. He was also keen on international communication and standardization for which he promoted Esperanto.
