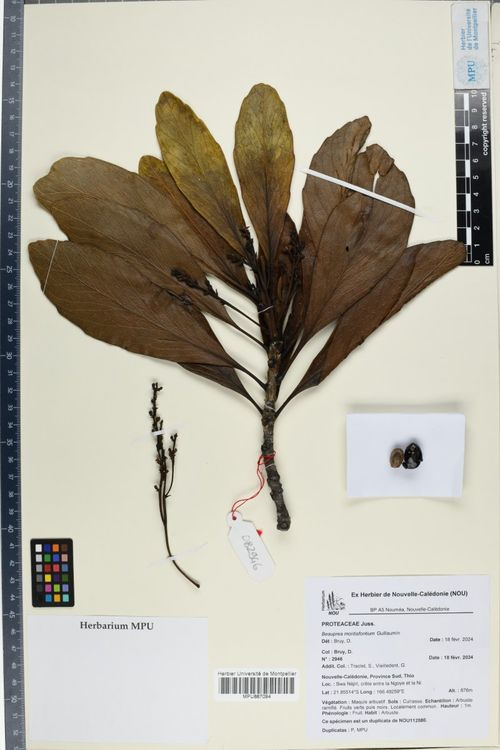

Scientific classification
- Kingdom: Plantae
- Clade: Embryophytes
- Clade: Tracheophytes
- Clade: Spermatophytes
- Clade: Angiosperms
- Clade: Eudicots
- Order: Proteales
- Family: Proteaceae
- Genus: Beauprea
- Species: B. montis-fontium

Binomial name
- Beauprea montis-fontium Guillaumin

= Beauprea montis-fontium =

Species of flowering plant

Beauprea montis-fontium is a species of shrub in the family Proteaceae. It is native to New Caledonia.

The species was described by André Guillaumin in 1959.

== Distribution ==
Beauprea montis-fontium is native to the wet tropical biome of south-east New Caledonia.

== Description ==
Beauprea montis-fontium is a shrub, which grows around 2 metres (6.6 ft) high. The branches are smooth. The inflorescences are up to 4.5 centimetres (1.8 in) long.
