= Cerberiopsis neriifolia =

Conservation status
- Vulnerable (IUCN 3.1)

Scientific classification
- Kingdom: Plantae
- Clade: Tracheophytes
- Clade: Angiosperms
- Clade: Eudicots
- Clade: Asterids
- Order: Gentianales
- Family: Apocynaceae
- Genus: Cerberiopsis
- Species: C. neriifolia

Binomial name
- Cerberiopsis neriifolia (S.Moore) Boit.

Species of plant

Cerberiopsis neriifolia is a species of flowering plant in the family Apocynaceae. It is endemic to New Caledonia.
