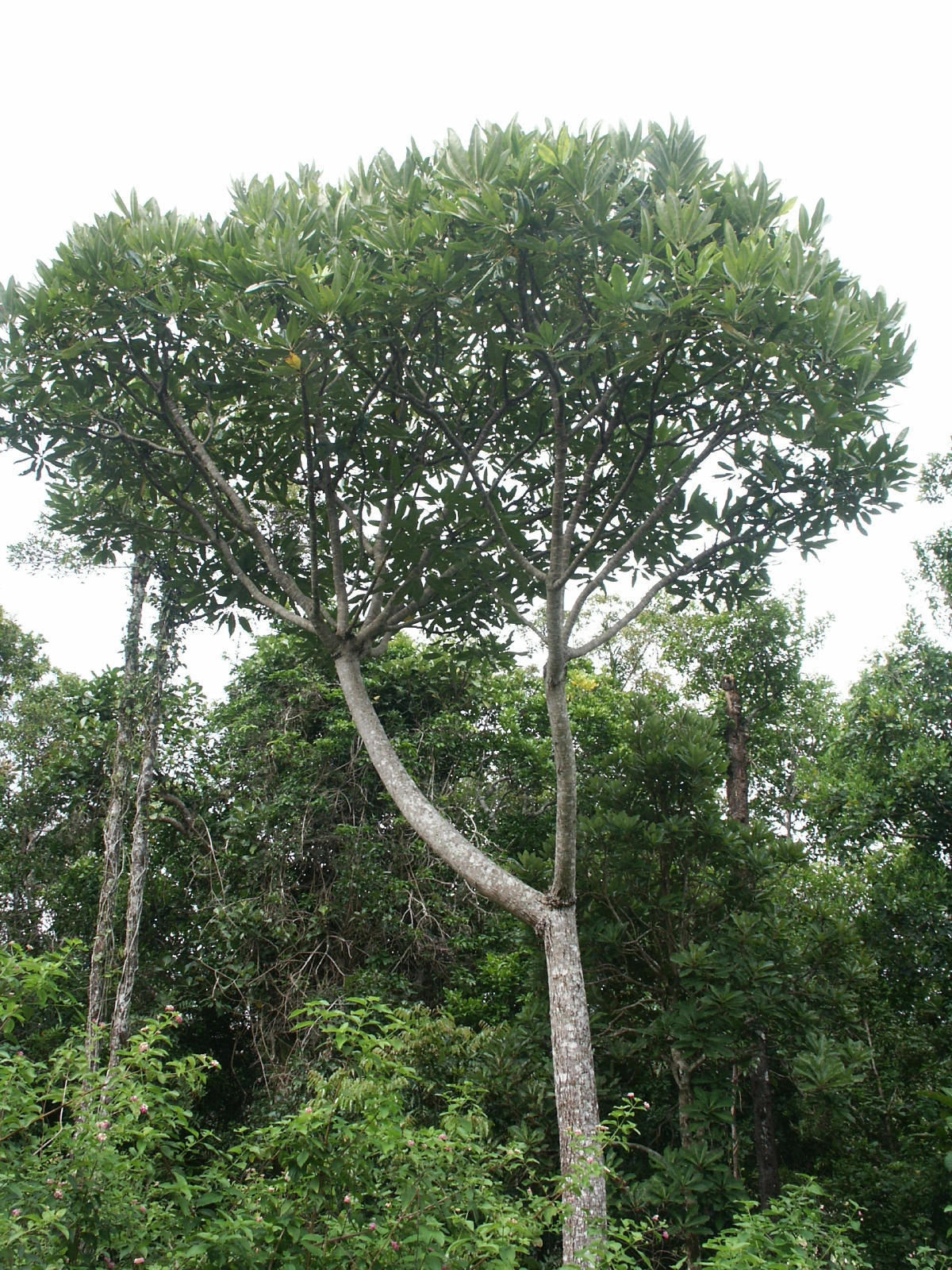
- Cerberiopsis candelabra

Scientific classification
- Kingdom: Plantae
- Clade: Embryophytes
- Clade: Tracheophytes
- Clade: Spermatophytes
- Clade: Angiosperms
- Clade: Eudicots
- Clade: Asterids
- Order: Gentianales
- Family: Apocynaceae
- Subfamily: Rauvolfioideae
- Tribe: Plumerieae
- Subtribe: Thevetiinae
- Genus: Cerberiopsis; Vieill. ex Pancher & Sebert

Synonyms
- Pterochrosia Baill.

= Cerberiopsis =

Genus of plants

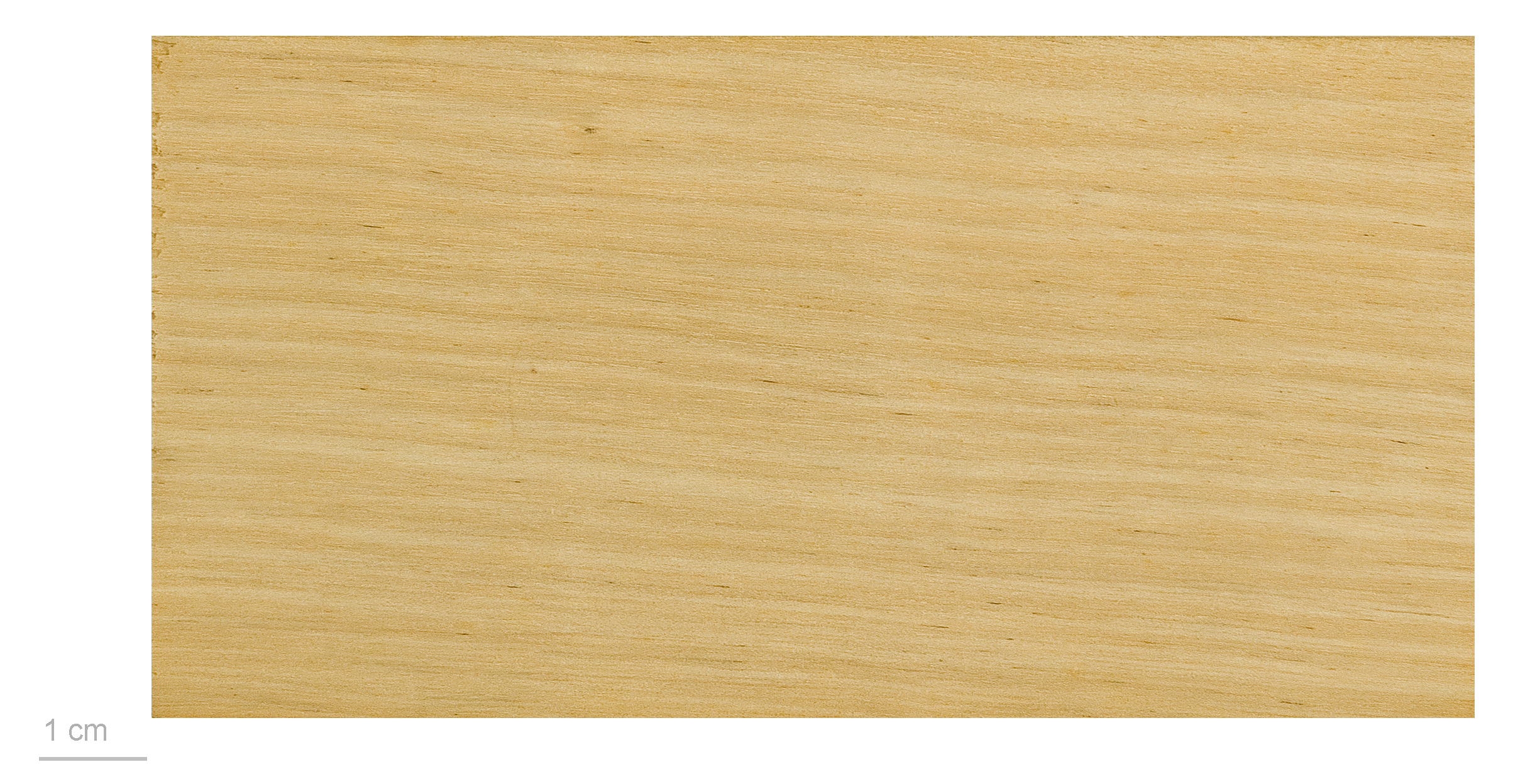
Cerberiopsis candelabra - MHNT

Cerberiopsis is a genus of plant in the family Apocynaceae, first described as a genus in 1873. The entire group is endemic to New Caledonia. The genus is related to Cerbera.

== List of species ==
1. Cerberiopsis candelabra Vieill. ex Pancher & Sebert
2. Cerberiopsis neriifolia (S. Moore) Boiteau
3. Cerberiopsis obtusifolia (Van Heurck & F. Muell.) Boiteau
