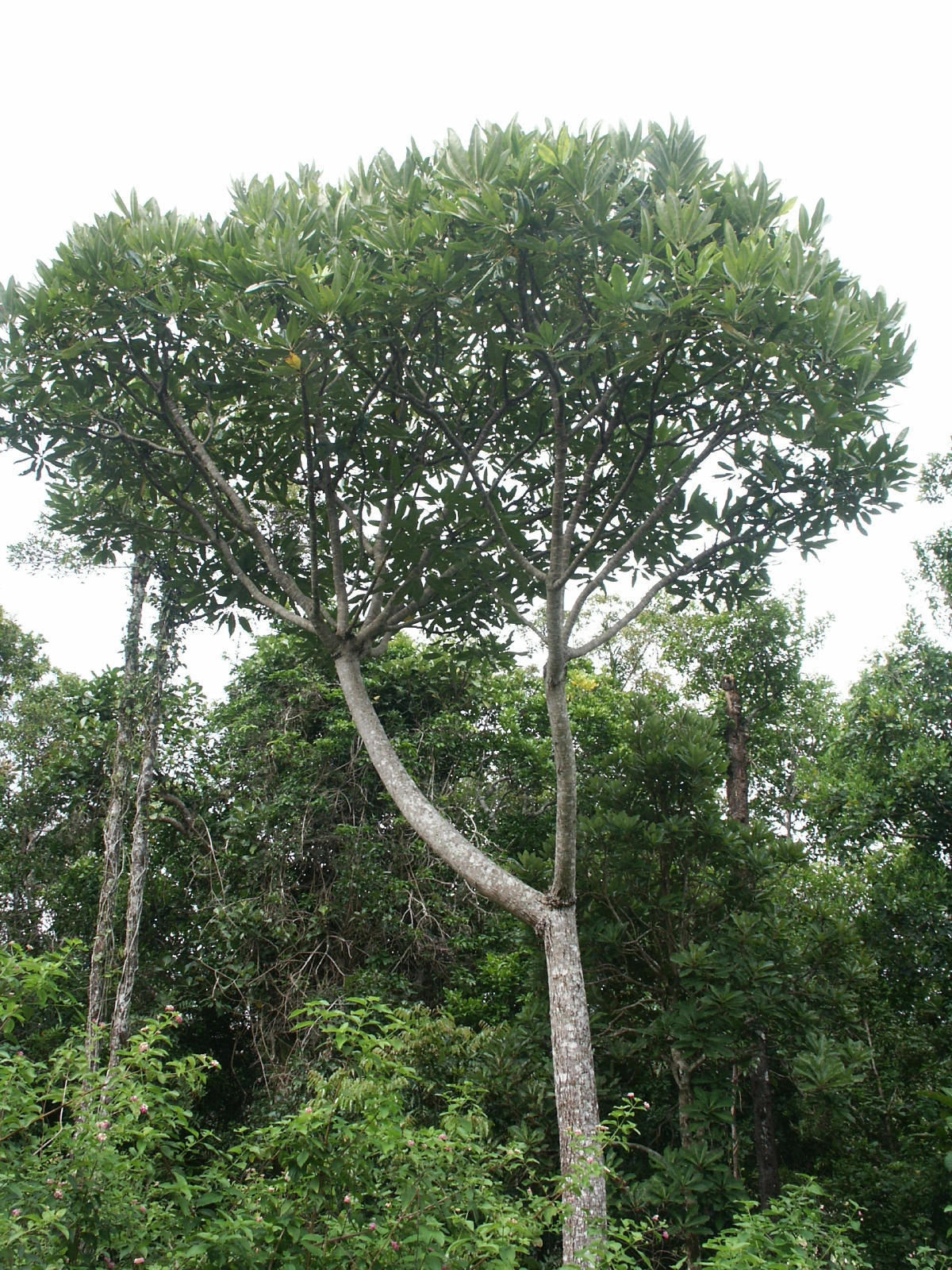

Scientific classification
- Kingdom: Plantae
- Clade: Tracheophytes
- Clade: Angiosperms
- Clade: Eudicots
- Clade: Asterids
- Order: Gentianales
- Family: Apocynaceae
- Genus: Cerberiopsis
- Species: C. candelabra

Binomial name
- Cerberiopsis candelabra Vieill. ex Pancher & Sebert

= Cerberiopsis candelabra =

Species of plant

Cerberiopsis candelabra is a species of plant in the family Apocynaceae. It is endemic to New Caledonia. Unlike most trees, the species is monocarpic, flowering only once in its lifetime before dying.
