= Basselinia tomentosa =

Conservation status
- Near Threatened (IUCN 3.1)

Scientific classification
- Kingdom: Plantae
- Clade: Tracheophytes
- Clade: Angiosperms
- Clade: Monocots
- Clade: Commelinids
- Order: Arecales
- Family: Arecaceae
- Genus: Basselinia
- Species: B. tomentosa

Binomial name
- Basselinia tomentosa Becc.

Species of palm

Basselinia tomentosa is a species of flowering plant in the family Arecaceae. It is found only in New Caledonia.
