= Clinosperma macrocarpa =

Conservation status
- Critically Endangered (IUCN 3.1)

Scientific classification
- Kingdom: Plantae
- Clade: Tracheophytes
- Clade: Angiosperms
- Clade: Monocots
- Clade: Commelinids
- Order: Arecales
- Family: Arecaceae
- Genus: Clinosperma
- Species: C. macrocarpa

Binomial name
- Clinosperma macrocarpa (H.E.Moore) Pintaud & W.J.Baker

Synonyms
- Lavoixia macrocarpa H.E.Moore

Species of palm

Clinosperma macrocarpa is a species of palm tree known from a single population at around 500 metres (1,600 ft) altitude on Mont Panié, New Caledonia. It was described as the only species in the genus Lavoixia, but has since been moved to genus Clinosperma. It is listed as critically endangered on the IUCN Red List.
