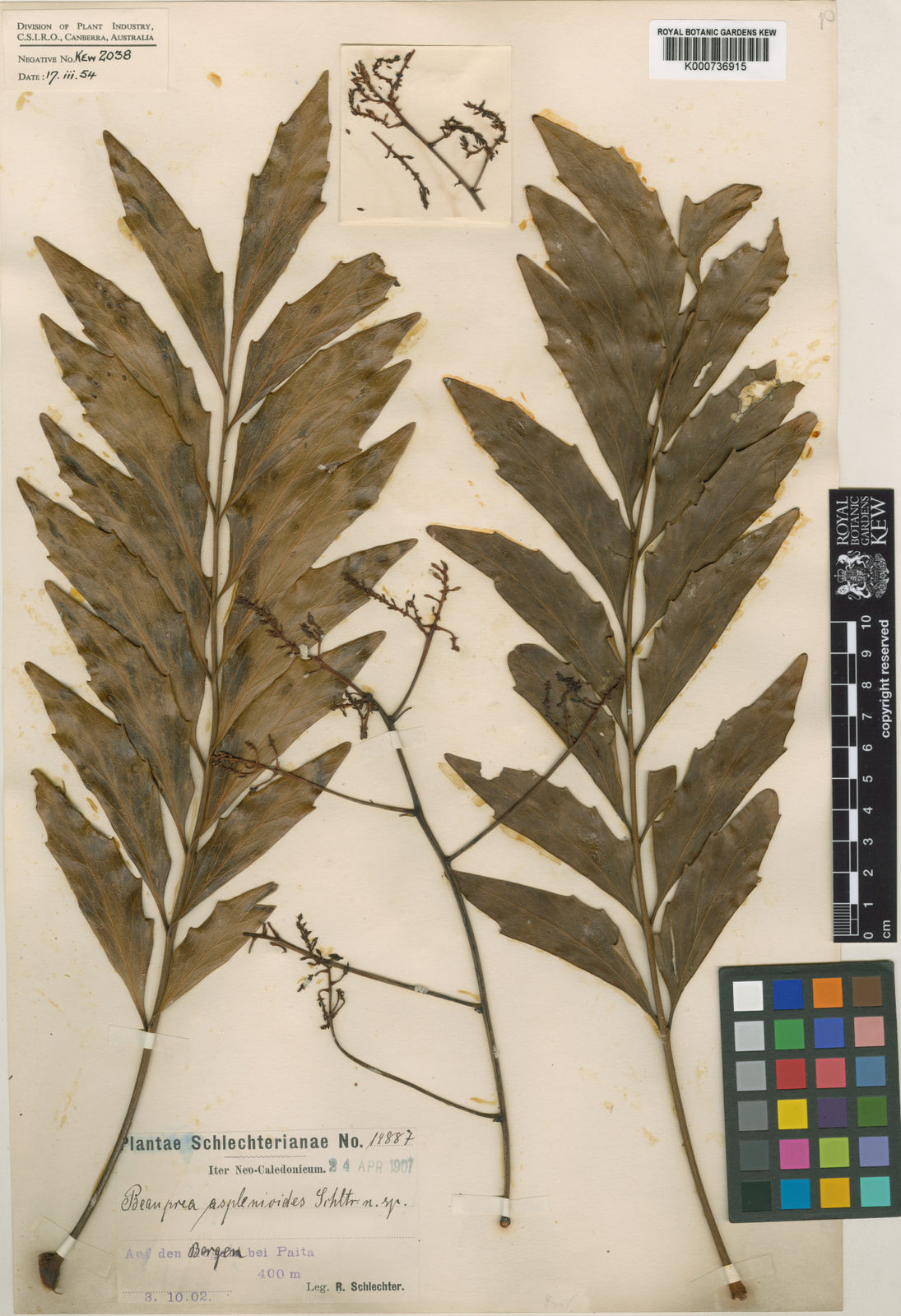

Scientific classification
- Kingdom: Plantae
- Clade: Tracheophytes
- Clade: Angiosperms
- Clade: Eudicots
- Order: Proteales
- Family: Proteaceae
- Genus: Beauprea
- Species: B. asplenioides

Binomial name
- Beauprea asplenioides Schltr.

= Beauprea asplenioides =

Species of flowering plant

Beauprea asplenioides is a species of flowering plant in the family Proteaceae. It is a shrub or tree.

Beauprea asplenioides is native to the wet tropical biome of south eastern New Caledonia. The species was described by Rudolf Schlechter in 1906.
