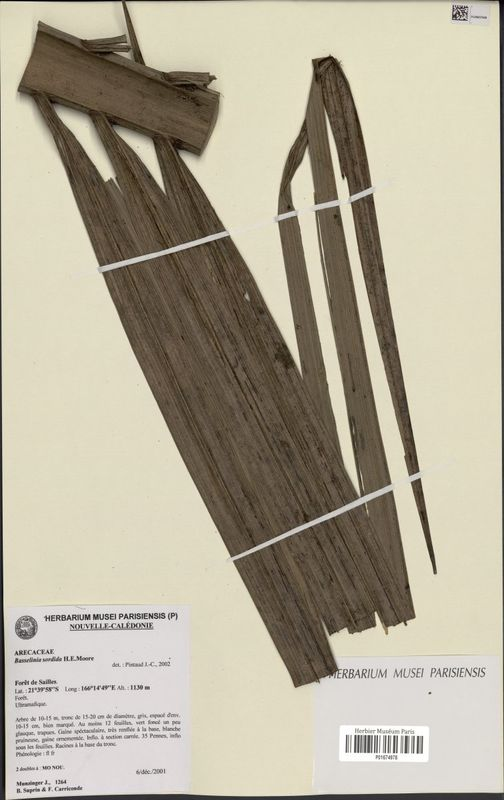

Conservation status
- Least Concern (IUCN 3.1)

Scientific classification
- Kingdom: Plantae
- Clade: Embryophytes
- Clade: Tracheophytes
- Clade: Angiosperms
- Clade: Monocots
- Clade: Commelinids
- Order: Arecales
- Family: Arecaceae
- Genus: Basselinia
- Species: B. sordida

Binomial name
- Basselinia sordida H.E.Moore

= Basselinia sordida =

Species of flowering plant

Basselinia sordida is a species of flowering plant in the family Arecaceae. It is a palm tree endemic to New Caledonia. The species was described in 1984, and is listed as of Least Concern by the International Union for Conservation of Nature.

== Taxonomy ==
The species was first described by Harold E. Moore. Moore's description was published in 1984.

== Distribution ==
Basselinia sordida is native to the wet tropical biome of north-west and west-central New Caledonia. It is abundant in west central Grande Terre, where its extent of occurrence is around 5,233 square kilometres (2,020 sq mi).

The species grows in dense, humid forests, in serpentine soil, at elevations of 1,000–1,500 metres (3,300–4,900 ft).

== Description ==
Basselinia sordida is a solitary palm tree, that grows in the subcanopy, or emerges above the canopy.

== Uses ==
Basselinia sordida seeds are sold in the international horticultural trade.

== Conservation ==
In 2016, the IUCN assessed Basselinia sordida as of Least Concern. The species faces no major threats. Some subpopulations may be affected by seed predation from invasive rats, and habitat destruction by wild pigs.

Basselinia sordida is legally protected in North Province and South Province. It grows in four protected areas: Forêt de Saille, Montagne des sources, La Dumbéa, and Haute Dumbéa.
