= Cerberiopsis obtusifolia =

Conservation status
- Vulnerable (IUCN 2.3)

Scientific classification
- Kingdom: Plantae
- Clade: Tracheophytes
- Clade: Angiosperms
- Clade: Eudicots
- Clade: Asterids
- Order: Gentianales
- Family: Apocynaceae
- Genus: Cerberiopsis
- Species: C. obtusifolia

Binomial name
- Cerberiopsis obtusifolia (Van Heurck & F.Muell.) Boit.

Species of plant

Cerberiopsis obtusifolia is a species of plant in the family Apocynaceae. It is endemic to New Caledonia. It is threatened by habitat loss.
