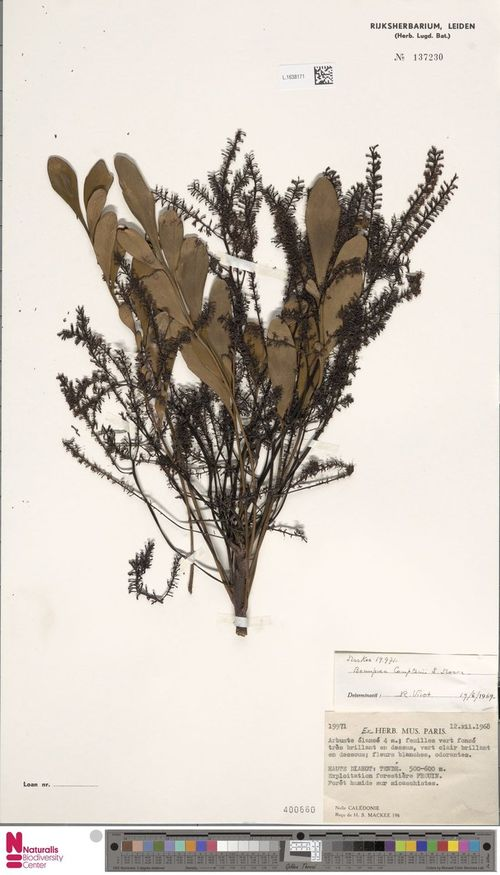

Conservation status
- Least Concern (IUCN 3.1)

Scientific classification
- Kingdom: Plantae
- Clade: Embryophytes
- Clade: Tracheophytes
- Clade: Spermatophytes
- Clade: Angiosperms
- Clade: Eudicots
- Order: Proteales
- Family: Proteaceae
- Genus: Beauprea
- Species: B. comptonii

Binomial name
- Beauprea comptonii S.Moore

Synonyms
- Beauprea multijuga S.Moore

= Beauprea comptonii =

Species of flowering plant

Beauprea comptonii is a species of flowering plant in the family Proteaceae. It is a shrub or tree native to the forests of New Caledonia.

B. comptonii was described in 1921. The IUCN classifies the species as of Least Concern.

== Taxonomy ==
The species was described in 1921, by Spencer Le Marchant Moore. He originally described the species as Beauprea multijuga.

== Distribution ==
Beauprea comptonii is native to the wet tropical biome of northern and central New Caledonia. It is endemic to the region. The species is found in the forests and undergrowth of Grande Terre, at elevations of 200–1,500 feet (61–457 m).

== Description ==
Beauprea comptonii is a shrub 3–4 metres (9.8–13.1 ft), or a tree up to 10 metres (33 ft) high. The flowers are white, and slightly scented. The leaves are papery or leathery.

== Conservation ==
In 2021, the IUCN assessed Beauprea comptonii as of Least Concern. It is common, and has an extent of occurrence of around 2,795 square kilometres (1,079 sq mi). B. comptonii is not legally protected, but occurs in the protected areas of Aoupinié, Côte Oubliée and Mont Panié.
