= Clinosperma lanuginosa =

Conservation status
- Endangered (IUCN 3.1)

Scientific classification
- Kingdom: Plantae
- Clade: Tracheophytes
- Clade: Angiosperms
- Clade: Monocots
- Clade: Commelinids
- Order: Arecales
- Family: Arecaceae
- Genus: Clinosperma
- Species: C. lanuginosa

Binomial name
- Clinosperma lanuginosa (H.E.Moore) Pintaud & W.J.Baker

Synonyms
- Brongniartikentia lanuginosa H.E.Moore

Species of palm

Clinosperma lanuginosa is a species of flowering plant in the family Arecaceae. It is a palm tree found only in New Caledonia.
