= Beauprea congesta =

Conservation status
- Endangered (IUCN 2.3)

Scientific classification
- Kingdom: Plantae
- Clade: Embryophytes
- Clade: Tracheophytes
- Clade: Angiosperms
- Clade: Eudicots
- Order: Proteales
- Family: Proteaceae
- Genus: Beauprea
- Species: B. congesta

Binomial name
- Beauprea congesta Virot

Species of flowering plant

Beauprea congesta is a species of plant in the family Proteaceae. It is endemic to New Caledonia.
