= Jean Armand Isidore Pancher =

French gardener and botanist

Jean Armand Isidore Pancher (1 January 1814, in Versailles – 8 March 1877) was a French gardener and botanist.

Beginning in 1835, he worked as gardener with at Muséum National d'Histoire Naturelle in Paris. From 1849 to 1856, he served as a "jardinier colonial" in Tahiti, then as a government botanist in New Caledonia, based in Nouméa (1857–1869). After spending several years in France, he returned to the South Pacific in 1874 as a plant collector in the employ of Belgian horticulturist Jean Jules Linden. In 1877, he died in New Caledonia in an area between La Foa and Moindou.

Many of the plants that he collected from the Pacific were further examined by other botanists that included Adolphe-Théodore Brongniart and Jean Antoine Arthur Gris. The genus Pancheria (family Cunoniaceae) is named after him, as are taxa with the specific epithet of pancheri, an example being Acmopyle pancheri.

Specimens collected by Pancher are cared for at herbaria worldwide, including the National Museum of Natural History, France, the National Herbarium of Victoria at the Royal Botanic Gardens Victoria, Kew Herbarium and others.

== Publications ==
- Notice sur les bois de la Nouvelle Calédonie : suivie de considérations génerales sur les propriétés mécaniques des bois et sur les procédés employés pour les mesurer (with Hippolyte Sebert), 1874 – On the wood of New Caledonia, followed by general considerations on the mechanical properties of wood and the processes employed to measure.
