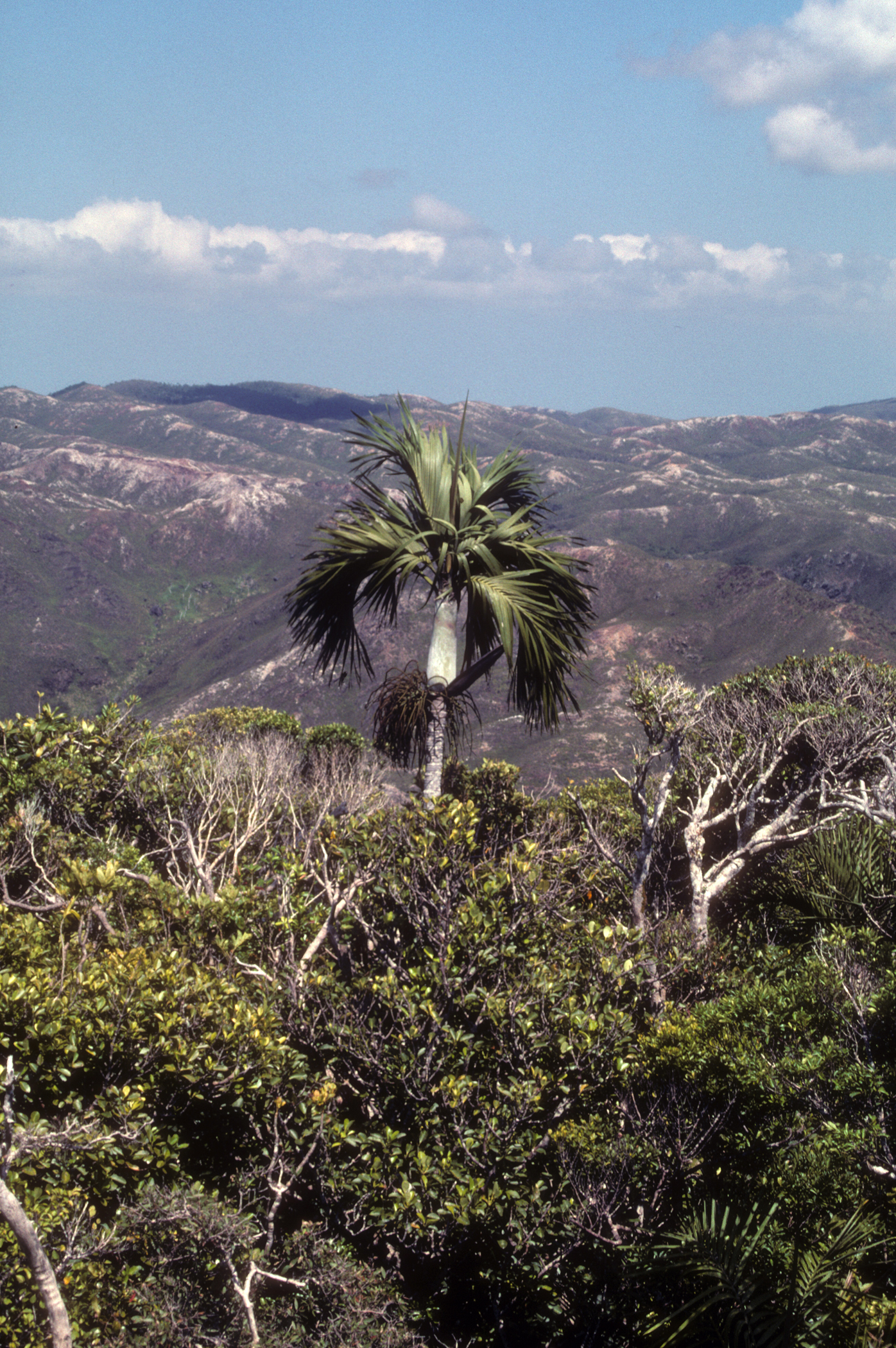

Conservation status
- Near Threatened (IUCN 3.1)

Scientific classification
- Kingdom: Plantae
- Clade: Tracheophytes
- Clade: Angiosperms
- Clade: Monocots
- Clade: Commelinids
- Order: Arecales
- Family: Arecaceae
- Genus: Cyphokentia
- Species: C. cerifera

Binomial name
- Cyphokentia cerifera (H.E.Moore) Pintaud & W.J.Baker

Synonyms
- Moratia cerifera H.E.Moore

= Cyphokentia cerifera =

Species of palm

Cyphokentia cerifera is a species of palm tree endemic to New Caledonia. It was previously placed the genus Moratia.
