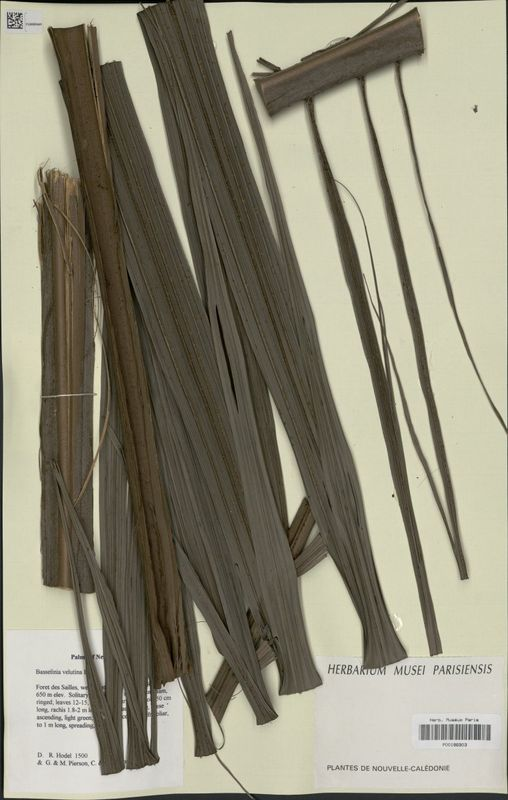

Conservation status
- Near Threatened (IUCN 3.1)

Scientific classification
- Kingdom: Plantae
- Clade: Embryophytes
- Clade: Tracheophytes
- Clade: Spermatophytes
- Clade: Angiosperms
- Clade: Monocots
- Clade: Commelinids
- Order: Arecales
- Family: Arecaceae
- Genus: Basselinia
- Species: B. velutina

Binomial name
- Basselinia velutina Becc.

= Basselinia velutina =

Species of flowering plant

Basselinia velutina is a species of flowering plant in the family Arecaceae. It is a palm tree endemic to New Caledonia. The species was described in 1921, and is listed as Near Threatened by the International Union for Conservation of Nature.

== Taxonomy ==
The species was described by Odoardo Beccari in 1921.

== Distribution ==
Basselinia velutina is native to the wet tropical biome of New Caledonia. It is widespread, but scattered, and grows from north-east to south-central Grande Terre. The species is present in around ten locations.

The species grows in humid forests, on schist soils, at elevations of 650–1,400 metres (2,130–4,590 ft).

== Description ==
Basselinia velutina is a solitary palm tree. It grows below the canopy, or emerges above it. The fruits are around 1 centimetre (0.39 in) in diameter, and have a pericarp around 1 millimetre (0.039 in) thick. The pericarp contains tannins.

== Conservation ==
In 2016, the IUCN assessed Basselinia velutina as Near Threatened. It is threatened by bushfires, and habitat damage caused by invasive wild pigs. Rats preying on seeds may also pose a threat.

The species is legally protected in North Province, and occurs in protected areas, including Mont Panié.
