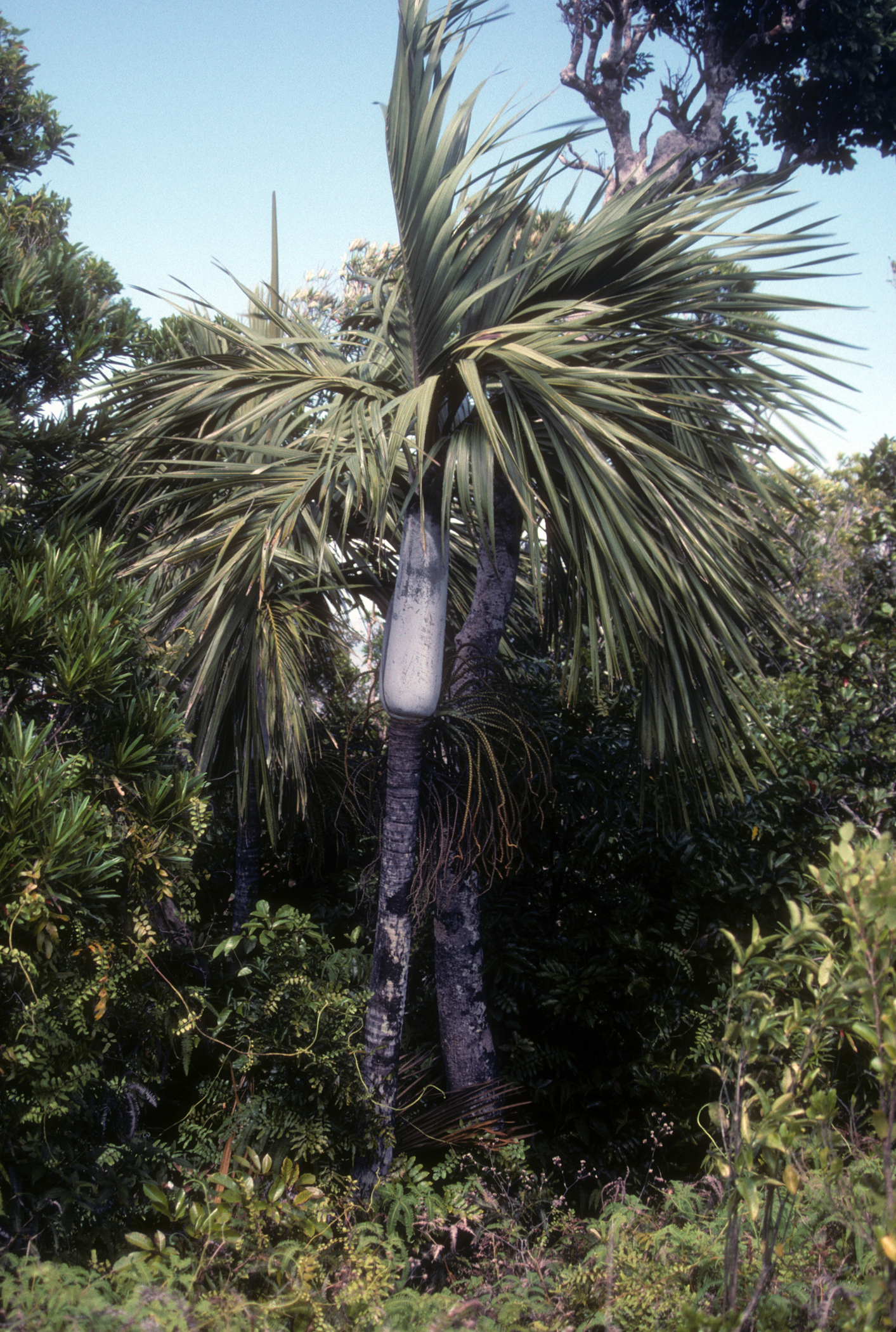
- Cyphokentia cerifera

Scientific classification
- Kingdom: Plantae
- Clade: Embryophytes
- Clade: Tracheophytes
- Clade: Spermatophytes
- Clade: Angiosperms
- Clade: Monocots
- Clade: Commelinids
- Order: Arecales
- Family: Arecaceae
- Subfamily: Arecoideae
- Tribe: Areceae
- Subtribe: Clinospermatinae
- Genus: Cyphokentia; Brongn.

Synonyms
- Moratia H.E.Moore

= Cyphokentia =

Genus of palms

Cyphokentia is a genus of flowering plant in the palm family endemic to New Caledonia. The genus is named from two Greek words meaning "tumor" and "Kentia", a former palm genus. The genus has two known species. Its closest relative is Clinosperma, also endemic to New Caledonia, and the sole other genus of the subtribe Clinospermatinae.

== List of species ==
- Cyphokentia cerifera (H.E.Moore) Pintaud & W.J.Baker
- Cyphokentia macrostachya Pancher ex Brongn.
