= Eugène Vieillard =

French physician and botanist

- Born: 1819
- Died: 1896 (aged 76–77)
- Known for: Plant collection in Tahiti and New Caledonia; Director of Caen Botanical Garden; namesake of plant genus Vieillardia and many species
- Scientific career
- Fields: Botany, medicine (Surgeon)
- Institutions: Caen Botanical Garden (Director, 1871-1895)
- Author abbrev. (botany): Vieill.

Eugène Vieillard (1819–1896) was a French physician and botanist.

Employed as a surgeon with the merchant navy, from 1855 to 1857 he collected plants in Tahiti with gardener-botanist Jean Armand Isidore Pancher. Afterwards, he spent a number of years conducting botanical investigations in New Caledonia, where he was a colleague to naturalist Émile Deplanche. Within this time period, he also collected ferns in New Zealand (1861) and visited the Cape of Good Hope and the island of Réunion. From 1871 to 1895, he was director of the botanical garden in Caen.

The plant genus Vieillardia was named in his honor by Jean Xavier Hyacinthe Montrouzier in 1860. More than 35 botanical species bear his name, a few examples being: Nepenthes vieillardii, Tristaniopsis vieillardii, Microsorum vieillardii and Dacrycarpus vieillardii. His name is also associated with a species of reptile found in New Caledonia, "Vieillard's chameleon gecko" (Eurydactylodes vieillardi).

== Selected works ==
- Plantes utiles de la Nouvelle-Calédonie, 1862 – Useful plants of New Caledonia.
- Etudes sur les genres Oxera et Deplanchea, 1862 – Studies of the genera Oxera and Deplanchea.
- Essais Sur la Nouvelle-Calédonie, 1863 (with Émile Deplanche) – Essays on New Caledonia.
- Plantes de la Nouvelle-Calédonie, 1865 – Plants native to New Caledonia.
- Étude sur les palmiers de la Nouvelle-Calédonie, 1873 – Study of palms native to New Caledonia.
