= Jean Antoine Arthur Gris =

French botanist (1829–1872)

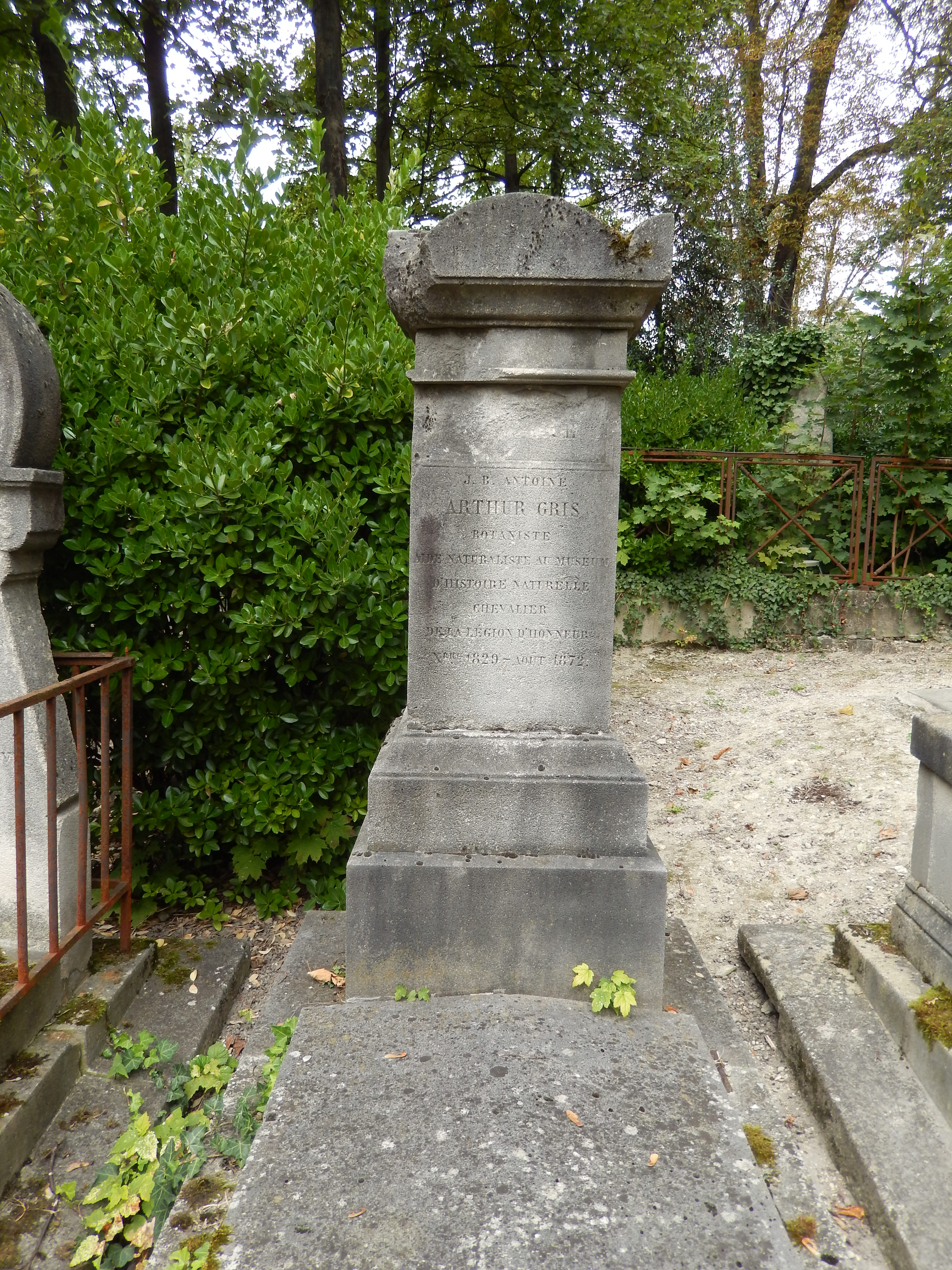
- Tomb of Jean Antoine Arthur Gris at Père Lachaise
- Born: 11 December 1829; Châtillon-sur-Seine, Côte-d'Or, France
- Died: 19 August 1872 (aged 42); Paris, France
- Burial place: Père-Lachaise Cemetery
- Occupation: Botanist
- Awards: the genus Grisia named in his honor

Jean Antoine Arthur Gris (11 December 1829 – 19 August 1872) was a French botanist who was a native of Châtillon-sur-Seine, in the department of Côte-d'Or.

Beginning in 1855 he worked in the laboratory of Adolphe-Théodore Brongniart (1801–1876) at the Muséum national d'histoire naturelle in Paris. In 1859 he received his PhD with a dissertation involving microscopic studies of chlorophyll. He was the author of 80 scientific articles, the majority of them being published in the Bulletin de la Société botanique de France and the Annales des sciences naturelles.

In 1865, Brongniart named the genus Grisia (synonym: Bikkia, family: Rubiaceae) in his honor.

Jean Gris died in Paris on 19 August 1872 at the age of 42. He is buried in the cemetery of Père-Lachaise, 22nd division.
