= Adolphe-Théodore Brongniart =

French botanist (1801–1876)

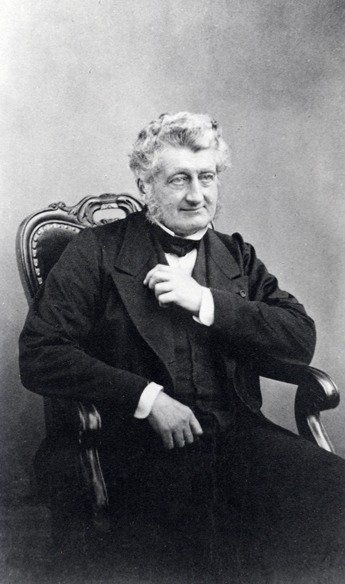
- Born: 14 January 1801; Paris, France
- Died: 18 February 1876 (aged 75)
- Known for: Histoire des végétaux fossiles
- Father: Alexandre Brongniart, geologist
- Relatives: Alexandre-Théodore Brongniart (grandfather), architect
- Awards: Wollaston Medal (1841), Commander, Légion d'honneur (1864)
- Scientific career
- Fields: Botany
- Institutions: Muséum national d'Histoire naturelle
- Author abbrev. (botany): Brongn.

Adolphe-Théodore Brongniart (French: [adɔlf teodɔːʁ bʁɔ̃ɲaːʁ]) FRS FRSE FGS (14 January 1801 – 18 February 1876) was a French botanist. He was the son of the geologist Alexandre Brongniart and grandson of the architect, Alexandre-Théodore Brongniart. Brongniart's pioneering work on the relationships between extinct and existing plants has earned him the title of father of paleobotany. His major work on plant fossils was his Histoire des végétaux fossiles (1828–37). He wrote his dissertation on the Buckthorn family (Rhamnaceae), an extant family of flowering plants, and worked at the Muséum national d'Histoire naturelle in Paris until his death. In 1851, he was elected a foreign member of the Royal Swedish Academy of Sciences. This botanist is denoted by the author abbreviation Brongn. when citing a botanical name.

== Brongniart's works ==
Brongniart was an indefatigable investigator and a prolific writer of books and memoirs. As early as 1822, he published a paper on the classification and distribution of fossil plants. This was followed by several papers chiefly bearing upon the relation between extinct and existing forms - a line of research which culminated in the publication of the Histoire des végétaux fossiles ("History of fossil plants"), which has earned for him the title of "father of paleobotany." This classification arranged fossil plants with their nearest living allies; it formed the basis of much subsequent work in paleobotany. It is of especial botanical interest, because, in accordance with Robert Brown's discoveries of the fundamental difference between Gymnosperms and Angiosperms, the Cycadeae and Coniferae were placed in the new group the gymnosperms. In Brongniart's Histoire des végétaux fossiles attention was also directed to the succession of forms in the various geological periods, with the important result that in the Palaeozoic period the Pteridophyta are found to predominate; in the Mesozoic, the Gymnosperms; in the Cenozoic, the Angiosperms, a result subsequently more fully stated in his Tableau des genres de végétaux fossiles. But the Histoire itself was not completed; the publication of successive parts proceeded regularly from 1828 to 1837, when the first volume was completed, but after that only three parts of the second volume appeared. Apart from his more comprehensive works, his most important palaeontological contributions are perhaps his observations on the structure of the treelike lycopodiopsid, Sigillaria, an extinct plant related to the living club mosses, and his researches (almost the last he undertook) on fossil seeds, of which a full account was published posthumously in 1880.

== Other pursuits ==
He was active in many branches of botany, including anatomy and the taxonomy of seed-producing plants. Among his achievements in this direction, the most notable is the treatise Sur la génération et le développement de l'embryon des Phanérogames ("On the generation and development of the spermatophyte embryo"), which is remarkable for the first account of any value of the development and structure of pollen, along with the confirmation of Giovanni Battista Amici's 1823 discovery of the pollen-tube, the confirmation of Robert Brown's views as to the structure of the unimpregnated ovule (with the introduction of the term "sac embryonnaire", or embryo sac), showing how nearly Brongniart anticipated Amici's subsequent (1846) discovery of the entrance of the pollen-tube into the micropyle, fertilizing the female cell, which then develops into the embryo.

Of his anatomical works, those of the greatest value are probably the "Recherches sur la structure et les fonctions des feuilles ("Research on the structure and function of leaves"), and the Nouvelles recherches sur l'épiderme ("New research on the epidermis"), in which, among other important observations, the discovery of the cuticle is recorded; and, further, the Recherches sur l'organisation des tiges des Cycadées ("Research on the organization of cycad stems"), giving the results of the first investigation of the anatomy of those plants.

His systematic work is represented by a large number of papers and monographs, many of which relate to the flora of New Caledonia; and by his Énumération des genres de plantes cultivées au Muséum d'histoire naturelle de Paris (1843), a catalogue of the plants in cultivation at the French National Museum of Natural History; it is a landmark in the history of classification in that it forms the starting-point of the classification system, modified successively by Alexander Braun, August W. Eichler and Adolf Engler, which was not superseded until the development of DNA research.

Brongniart sailed with Louis-Isidore Duperrey aboard the Coquille, and with Jules Dumont d'Urville and Bory de Saint-Vincent, wrote the botanical atlas for the voyage.

In addition to his scientific and professorial labours, Brongniart held various important official posts in connection with the department of education, and interested himself greatly in agricultural and horticultural matters. With Jean Victoire Audouin and Jean-Baptiste Dumas, his future brothers-in-law, Brongniart founded the Annales des Sciences Naturelles, a peer-reviewed journal, in 1824. He also founded the Société Botanique de France in 1854, and was its first president.

Brongniart died in Paris in 1872 and is buried in Division 20 of the Cimetière du Père Lachaise.
