= Sigaloseps =

Scientific classification
- Kingdom: Animalia
- Phylum: Chordata
- Class: Reptilia
- Order: Squamata
- Family: Scincidae
- Subfamily: Eugongylinae
- Genus: Sigaloseps; Sadlier, 1987
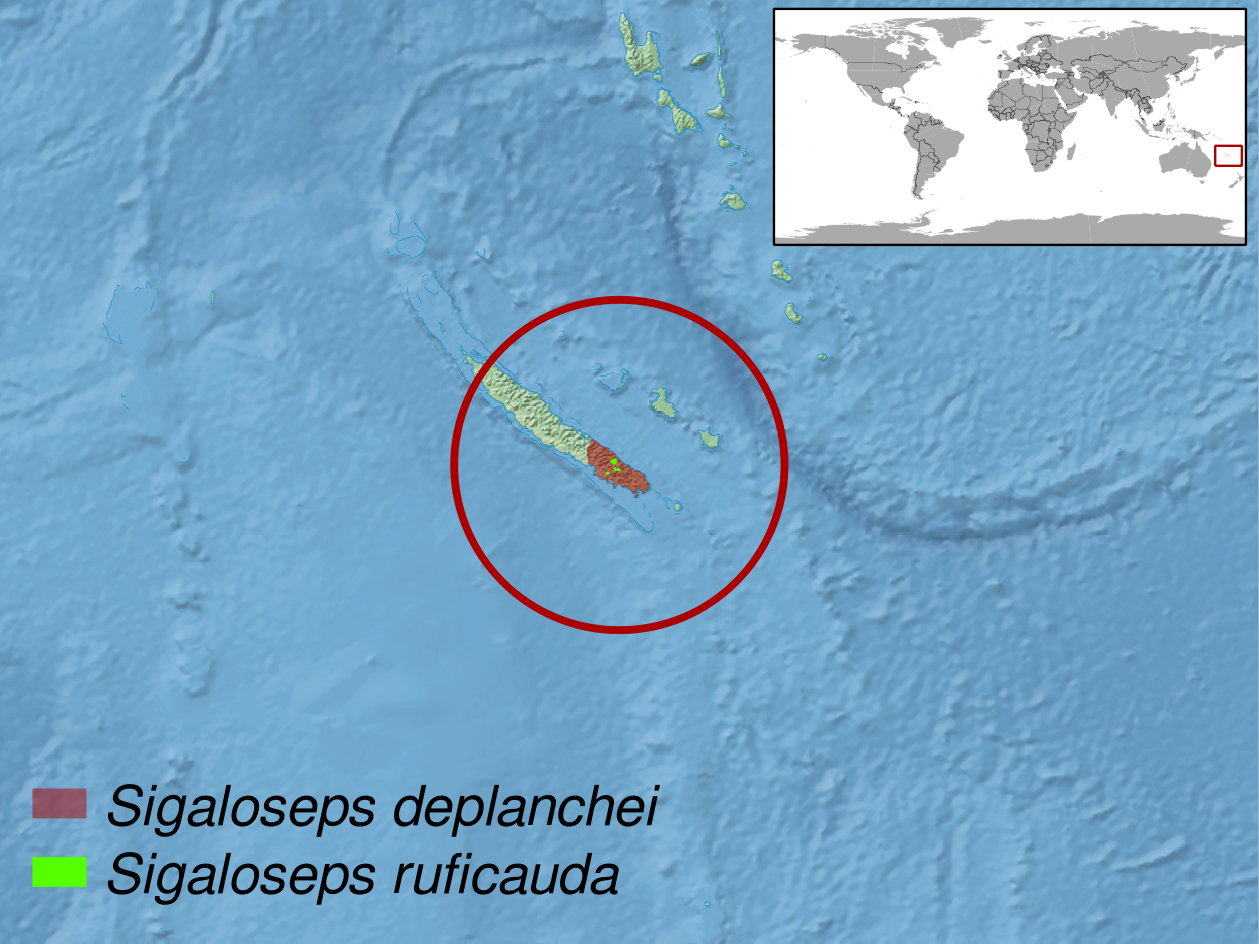

Genus of lizards

Sigaloseps is a genus of skinks which inhabit the moist, closed forest of southern New Caledonia.

== Conservation status ==
There is some conservation concern for Sigaloseps because of mining activity taking place in the region.

== Species ==
The following 6 species are recognized as being valid.

- Sigaloseps balios Sadlier, Bauer, & Wood, 2014
- Sigaloseps conditus Sadlier, Bauer, & Wood, 2014
- Sigaloseps deplanchei (Bavay, 1869) - Deplanche's shiny skink
- Sigaloseps ferrugicauda Sadlier, Smith, Shea, & Bauer, 2014
- Sigaloseps pisinnus Sadlier, Shea, Whitaker, Bauer, & Wood, 2014
- Sigaloseps ruficauda Sadlier & Bauer, 1999

Nota bene: A binomial authority in parentheses indicates that the species was originally described in a genus other than Sigaloseps.

== Etymology ==
The specific name, deplanchei, is in honor of French naturalist Émile Deplanche.
