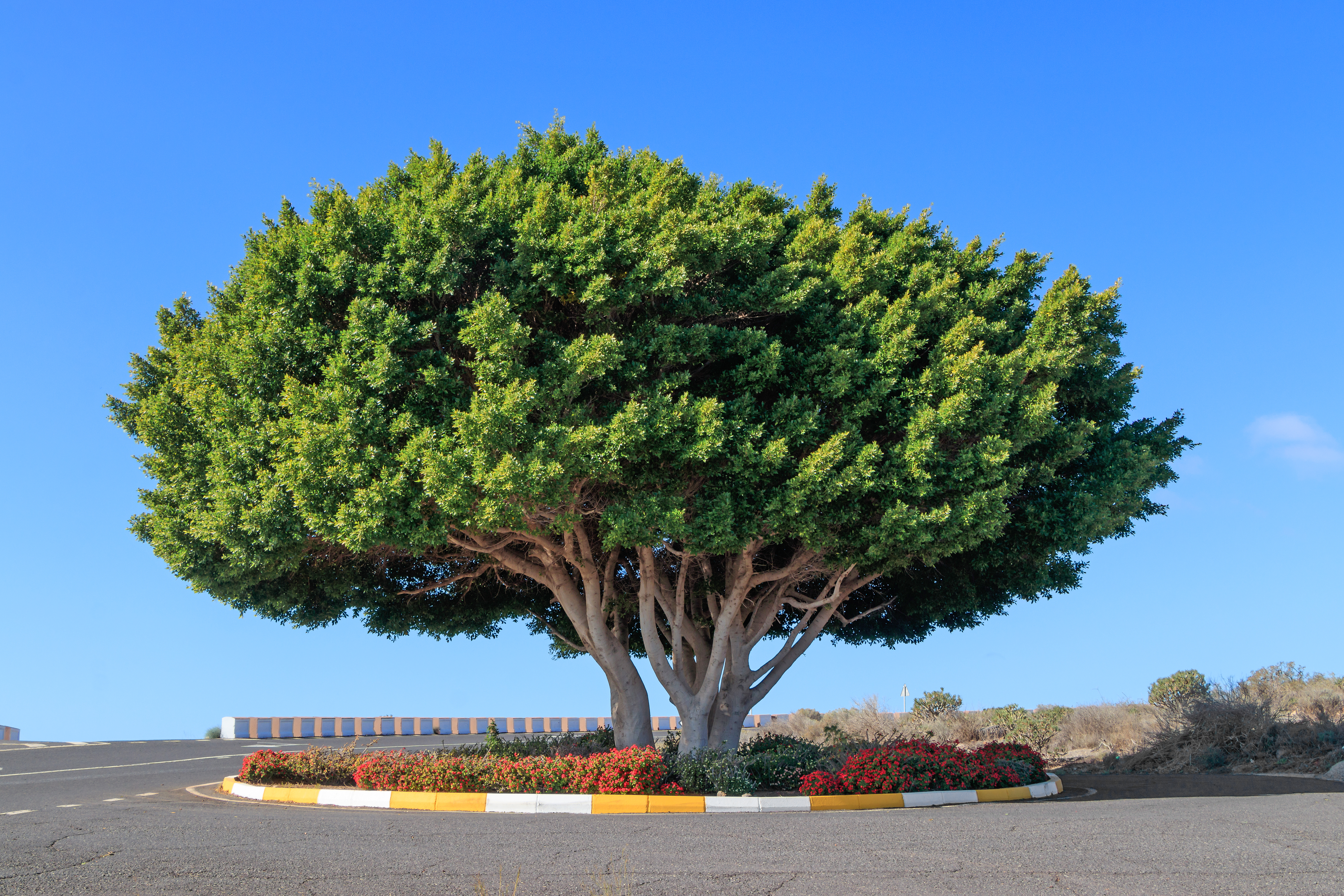

Conservation status
- Least Concern (IUCN 3.1)

Scientific classification
- Kingdom: Plantae
- Clade: Tracheophytes
- Clade: Angiosperms
- Clade: Eudicots
- Clade: Rosids
- Order: Rosales
- Family: Moraceae
- Genus: Ficus
- Subgenus: F. subg. Urostigma
- Species: F. microcarpa

Binomial name
- Ficus microcarpa L.f.

Varieties
- Ficus microcarpa var. hillii (F.M.Bailey) Corner; Ficus microcarpa var. microcarpa; Ficus microcarpa var. saffordii (Merr.) Corner

Synonyms
- Urostigma microcarpum (L.f.) Miq.; var. hillii: Ficus prolixa Vieill. & Deplanche; Ficus hillii F.M.Bailey; Ficus schlechteri Warb.; var. microcarpa: Ficus rubra Roth; Ficus rubra var. acuminata B.Heyne ex Roth; Ficus littoralis Blume; Ficus condaravia Buch.-Ham.; Urostigma amblyphyllum Miq.; Urostigma pisiferum Miq.; Urostigma littorale (Blume) Miq.; Urostigma accedens var. latifolia Miq.; Ficus dilatata Miq.; Ficus amblyphylla (Miq.) Miq.; Ficus dyctiophleba F.Muell. ex Miq.; Ficus retusa f. parvifolia Miq.; Ficus retusa var. pisifera (Miq.) Miq.; Ficus retusa f. pubescens Miq.; Ficus dictyophleba F.Muell. ex Miq.; Ficus naumannii Engl.; Ficus retusa var. nitida King; Ficus thynneana F.M.Bailey; Ficus dahlii K.Schum.; Ficus cairnsii Warb.; Ficus retusiformis H.Lév.; Ficus thynneana var. minor Domin; Ficus thynneana var. typica Domin; Ficus regnans Diels; Ficus microcarpa f. pubescens Corner; Ficus microcarpa var. latifolia (Miq.) Corner; Ficus microcarpa var. naumannii (Engl.) Corner; Ficus retusa var. crassifolia W.C.Shieh; Ficus microcarpa var. crassifolia (W.C.Shieh) J.C.Liao; Ficus microcarpa var. nitida F.C.Ho; Ficus microcarpa var. fuyuensis J.C.Liao; Ficus microcarpa var. oluangpiensis J.C.Liao; Ficus microcarpa var. pusillifolia J.C.Liao; var. saffordii: Ficus saffordii Merr.

= Ficus microcarpa =

Species of fig

Ficus microcarpa, also known as Chinese banyan, Hill's weeping fig, small-fruited fig, Malayan banyan, Indian laurel, or curtain fig, is a species of banyan tree in the family Moraceae. Its native range is from India to China and Japan, through Southeast Asia and the western Pacific to the state of Queensland in Australia, and it has been introduced to parts of the Americas and the Mediterranean. It was first described in 1782, and is a culturally significant plant in a number of Asian countries.

== Description ==
Ficus microcarpa is a large tropical tree that grows to 25 m (82 ft) tall, occasionally to 35 m (115 ft), with innumerable aerial roots descending from the branches that have the capacity to develop into accessory trunks or "prop roots". It may initially be epiphytic, lithophytic or terrestrial. The leaves are narrowly to broadly elliptic, measuring up to 12 cm (4.7 in) long by 9 cm (3.5 in) wide. They are glabrous (without hairs) and have 5–9 pairs of main lateral veins either side of the midrib, which form distinct loops within the leaf margin.

== Taxonomy ==
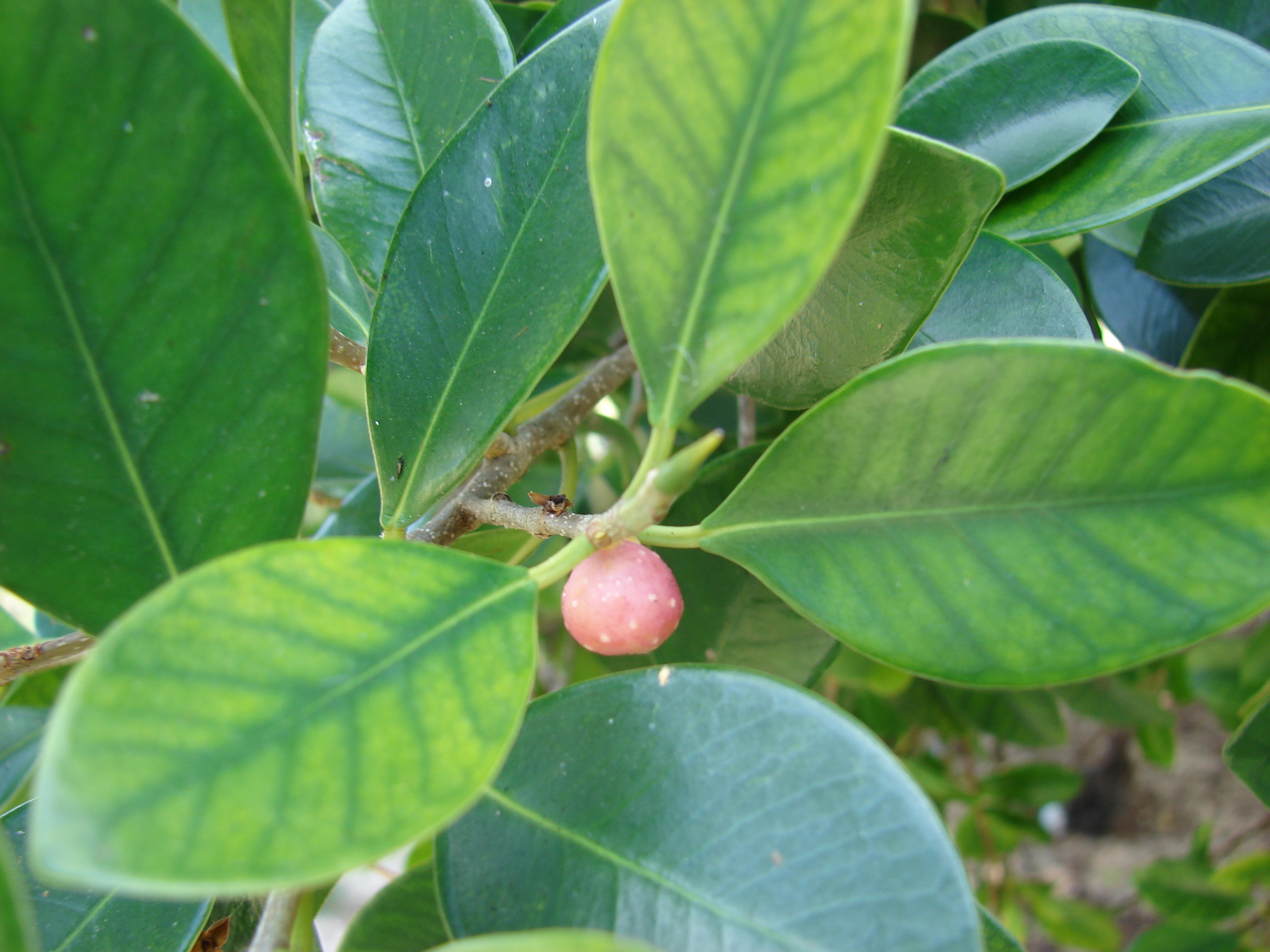
Foliage and fruit

Ficus microcarpa was described in 1782 by Carl Linnaeus the Younger. The species has a considerable number of synonyms. In 1965, E. J. H. Corner described seven varieties (and two forms of Ficus microcarpa var. microcarpa) which were regarded as synonyms under the name of Ficus microcarpa in the latest Flora Malesiana volume.

Hill's weeping fig was first formally described as a species, Ficus hillii, by Frederick Manson Bailey in the Botany Bulletin of the Queensland Department of Agriculture, based on a specimen collected in the "scrubs of tropical Queensland". In 1960, it was reassigned by E. J. H. Corner as a variety of F. microcarpa, namely F. microcarpa var. hillii.

== Distribution and habitat ==
Ficus microcarpa is native to tropical Asia, southern China, Taiwan, islands of the Western Pacific and Australia. A tropical and subtropical species, the tree requires a warm climate and a humid atmosphere. It can nevertheless withstand temperatures close to 0 °C. The species occurs mainly at low elevations, and its natural habitats include tropical rainforests, river edges, coasts, swamps and mangroves.

=== Introduced range ===
Ficus microcarpa was widely distributed as an ornamental plant and is one of the most common street trees in warm climates. It has been introduced to a number of countries in the Mediterranean, Central and South America, the Caribbean, and Hawaii, California and Florida in the US.

In urbanized areas, trees can grow in cracks, walls, buildings and other masonry elements. It seems that the species can tolerate urban pollutants in soil moisture, including sulfur dioxide, lead and cadmium, as well as salt.

The symbiotic pollinating fig wasp, Eupristina verticillata, was introduced along with F. microcarpa. Such an introduction, however, can be delayed: in Brazil - where specimens of the tree had been used in gardening since the nineteenth century, when it was introduced by the architect Auguste François Marie Glaziou into various public parks of Rio de Janeiro - the appearance of saplings began only during the 1970s. Such saplings are considered to be very aggressive, as they can grow in the walls of buildings, bridges, highways, and other concrete structures.

The tree is considered a major invasive species in Hawaii, Florida, Bermuda, Central America, and South America. F. microcarpa is widely used as a street and ornamental tree in areas of coastal California that are free of regular frost. Its strong roots can lift sidewalks and pavements, and many California cities no longer recommend planting them. In Southern California, a population of the symbiotic fig wasp is now established, which allows the ornamental trees to produce fertile fruit. Seeds are spread by fruit-eating birds, and F. microcarpa can now spread without direct human help. Naturalized populations have been found in Los Angeles, Orange, Riverside, San Diego, and Ventura counties, including on buildings, bridges, and other structures, and as an epiphyte on other trees, especially palm trees. It is commonly used as an ornamental tree in most of Spain's Mediterranean coast, as in the Balearic and the Canary islands. Ficus microcarpa can also be found on the southern coast of Sicily, in Rhodes and Cyprus. It is considered an invasive plant in Israel, although it is not widespread.

== Ecology ==
The pollinating fig wasp associated with Ficus microcarpa is Eupristina verticillata. In addition, 19 non-pollinating fig wasp species parasitize Ficus microcarpa figs. These fig wasps are from different families, which include those of the Eurytomidae and Pteromalidae families.

In some parts of its introduced range, it is very attractive to avian wildlife: in São Paulo, Brazil, ten species of birds were listed as feeding on its fruits, especially Turdus rufiventris, Pitangus sulphuratus, Turdus leucomelas, Thraupis sayaca and Celeus flavescens. Its fruit and leaves are also sought after and eaten by the parrot Aratinga leucophthalmus. Although invasive, its hardiness makes it an important species for the attraction of avian wildlife in urban environments.

== Cultivation ==
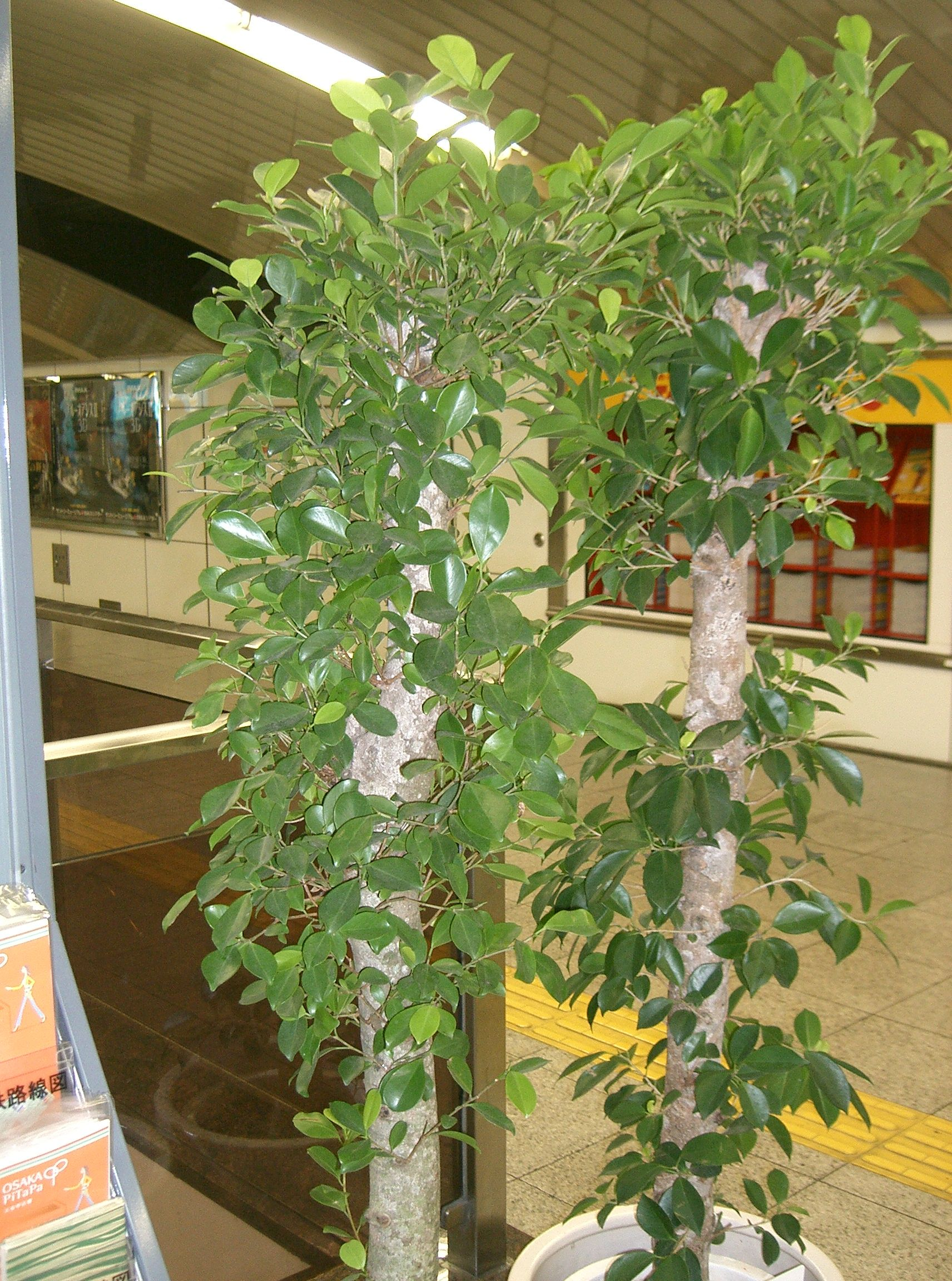
Ficus microcarpa as an indoor landscape plant.

Ficus microcarpa is cultivated as an ornamental tree for planting in gardens, parks, and in containers as an indoor plant and bonsai specimen. In Southeast Asia, it is cultivated as a shade tree because of its dense foliage. Its ability to produce discards also makes it easy to drive in hedge or bush.

As a tropical and subtropical tree, it is suitable for temperatures above 20 °C all year long, which explains why it is generally sold as a houseplant. It can, however, withstand relatively low temperatures, suffering damage only below 0 °C. High humidity (70% - 100%) is preferable and seems to favor the development of aerial roots. The species can be propagated easily by cuttings, either in water or directly in a substrate of sand or potting soil.

=== Medicine ===
The plant is also used in traditional medicine in India, Malaysia, China and Japan. In Japan, the bark, the aerial roots and dried leaves are traditionally used against pain and fever, while in China the plant is traditionally used among others against the flu, the malaria, bronchitis and rheumatism. The pharmacological properties of Ficus microcarpa include antioxidant activities, antibacterial, anticarcinogen and anti diabetic agents.

== Folklore ==
In Southeast Asia, F. microcarpa, among other species, is thought to be home to spirits, such as Pontianak (folklore). In China, large fig trees can be associated with beneficial spirits and vital energy ("Qi"). In Singapore, some trees are associated with places of worship among Buddhists and Taoists.

== Gallery ==
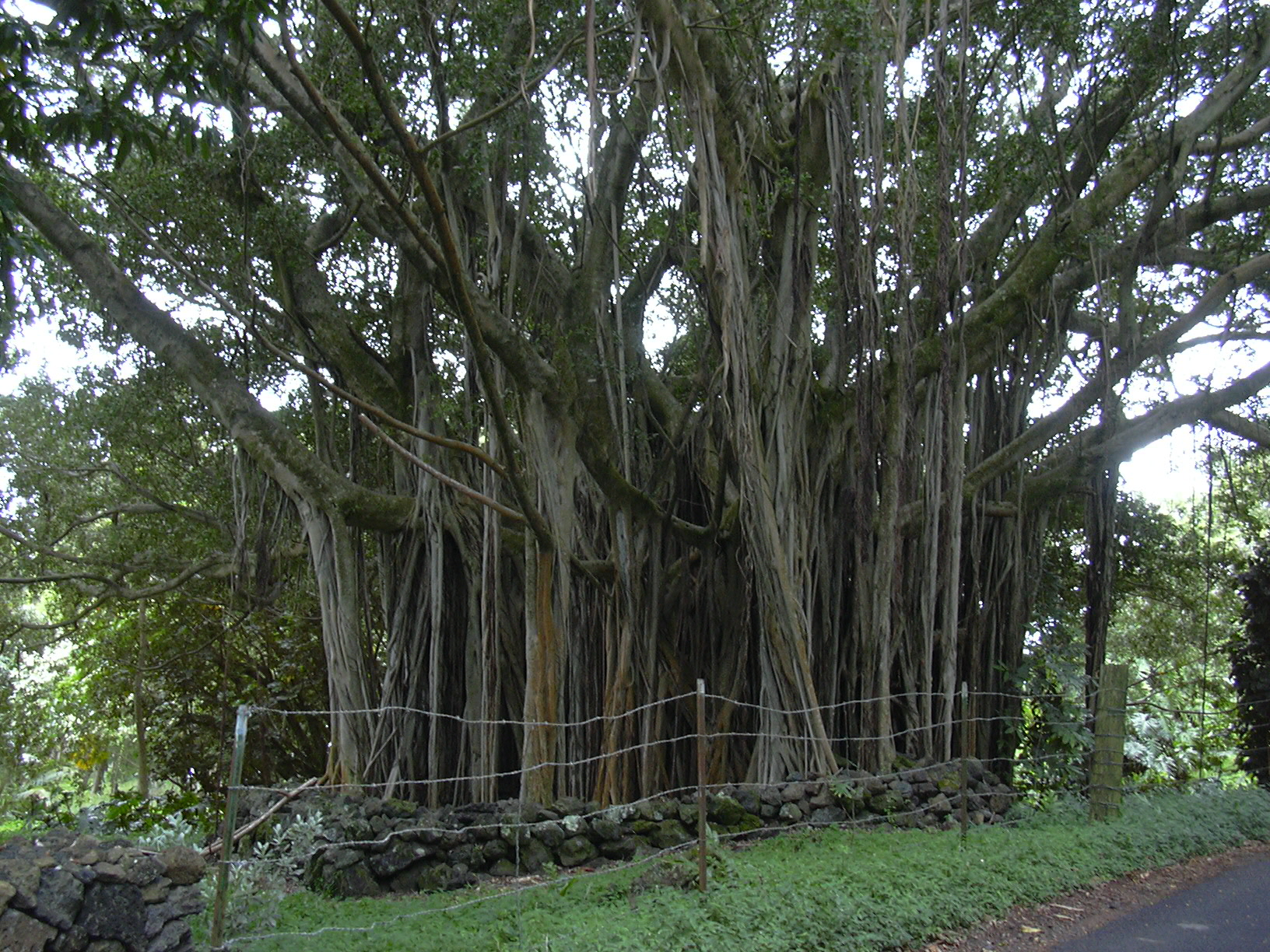
Ficus microcarpa with aerial roots.

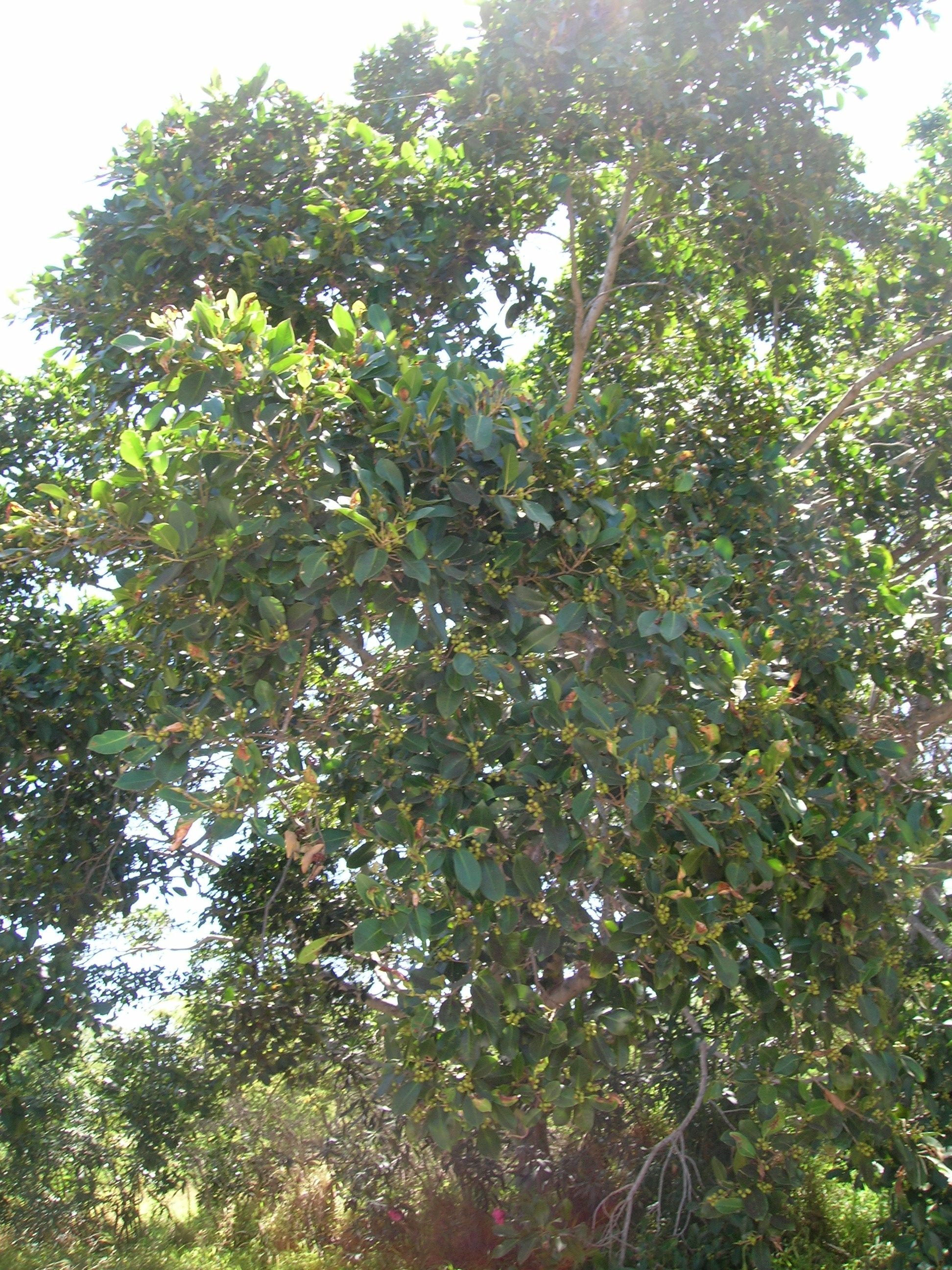
Foliage

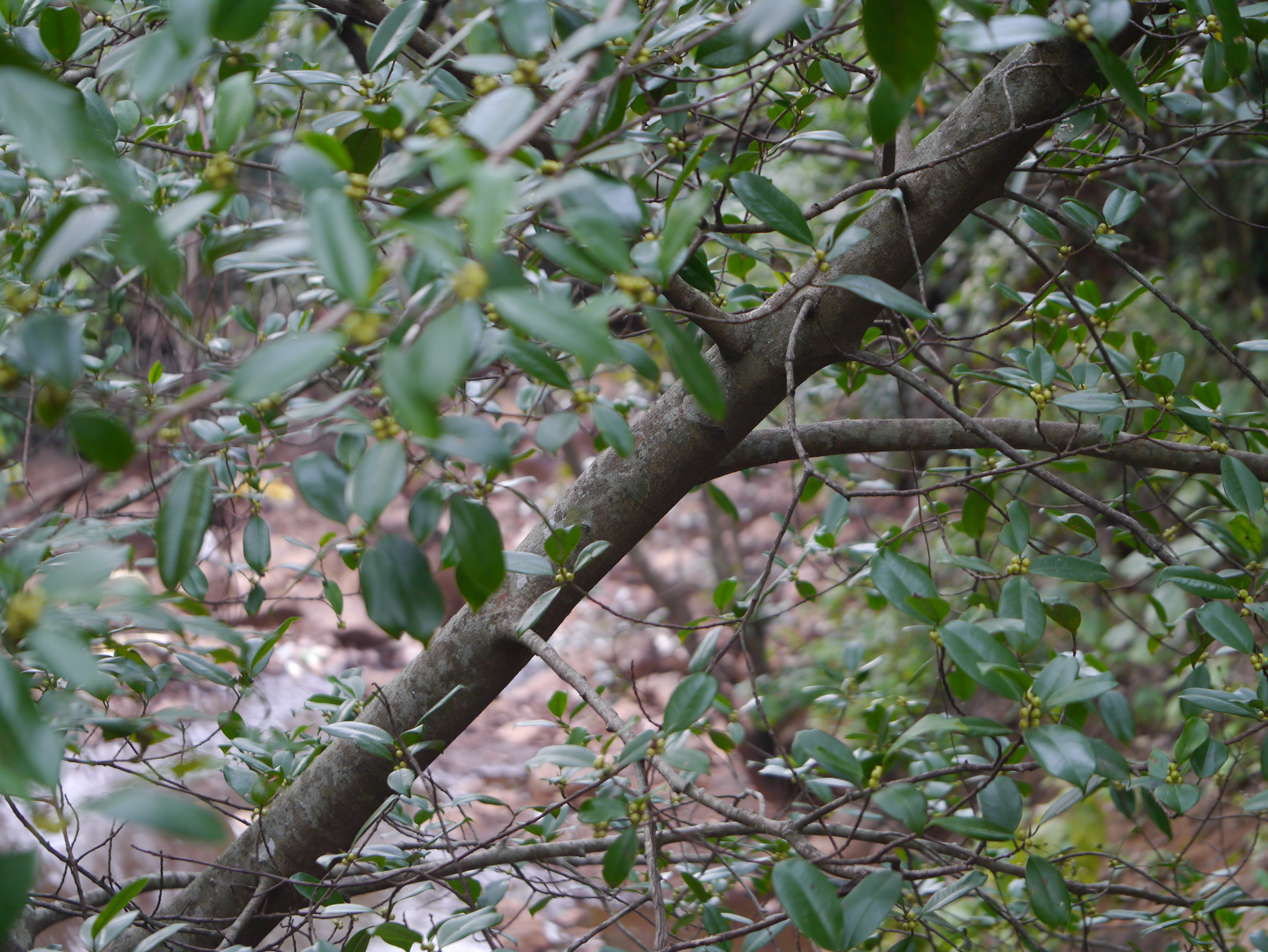
Branch and leaves

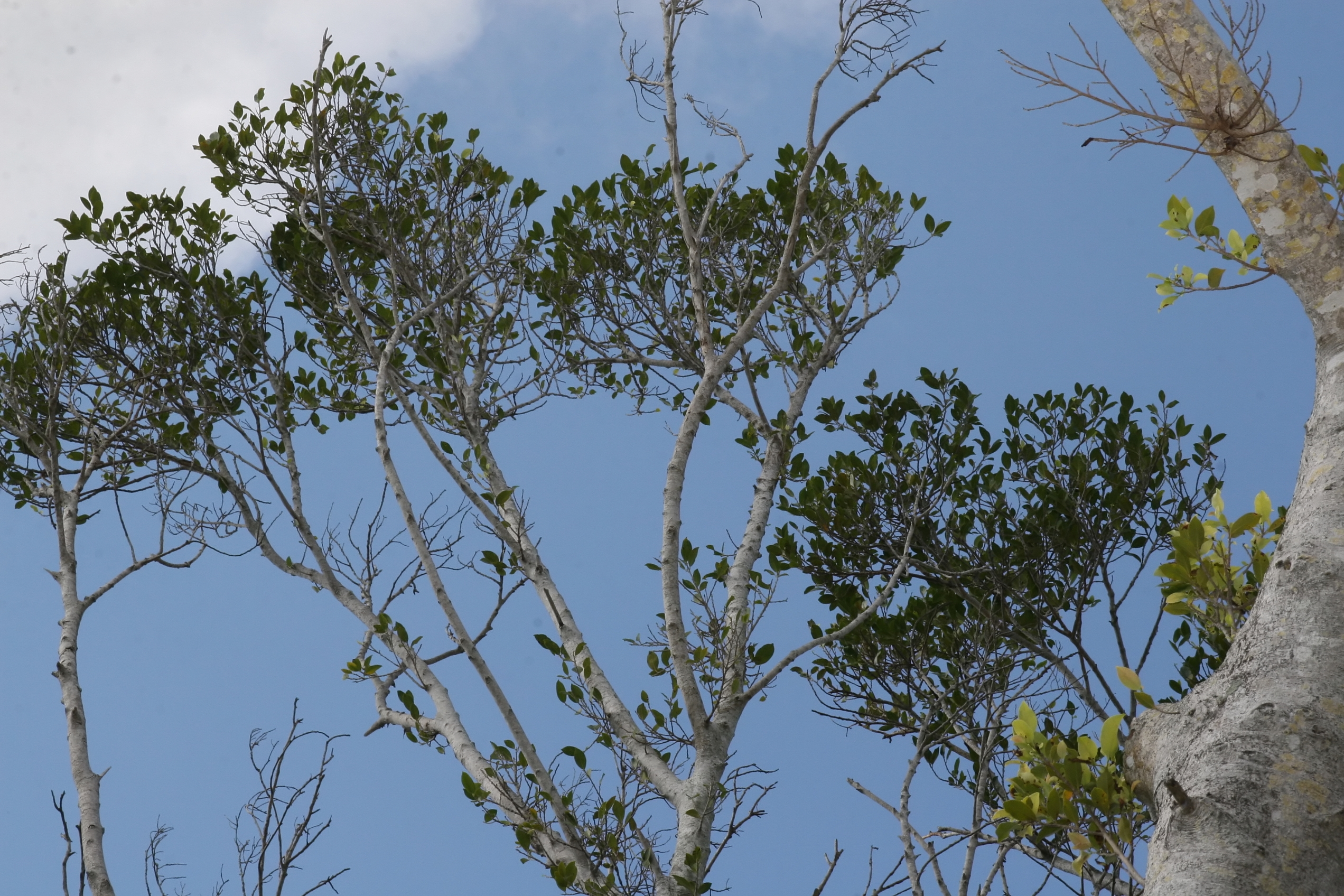
A tree

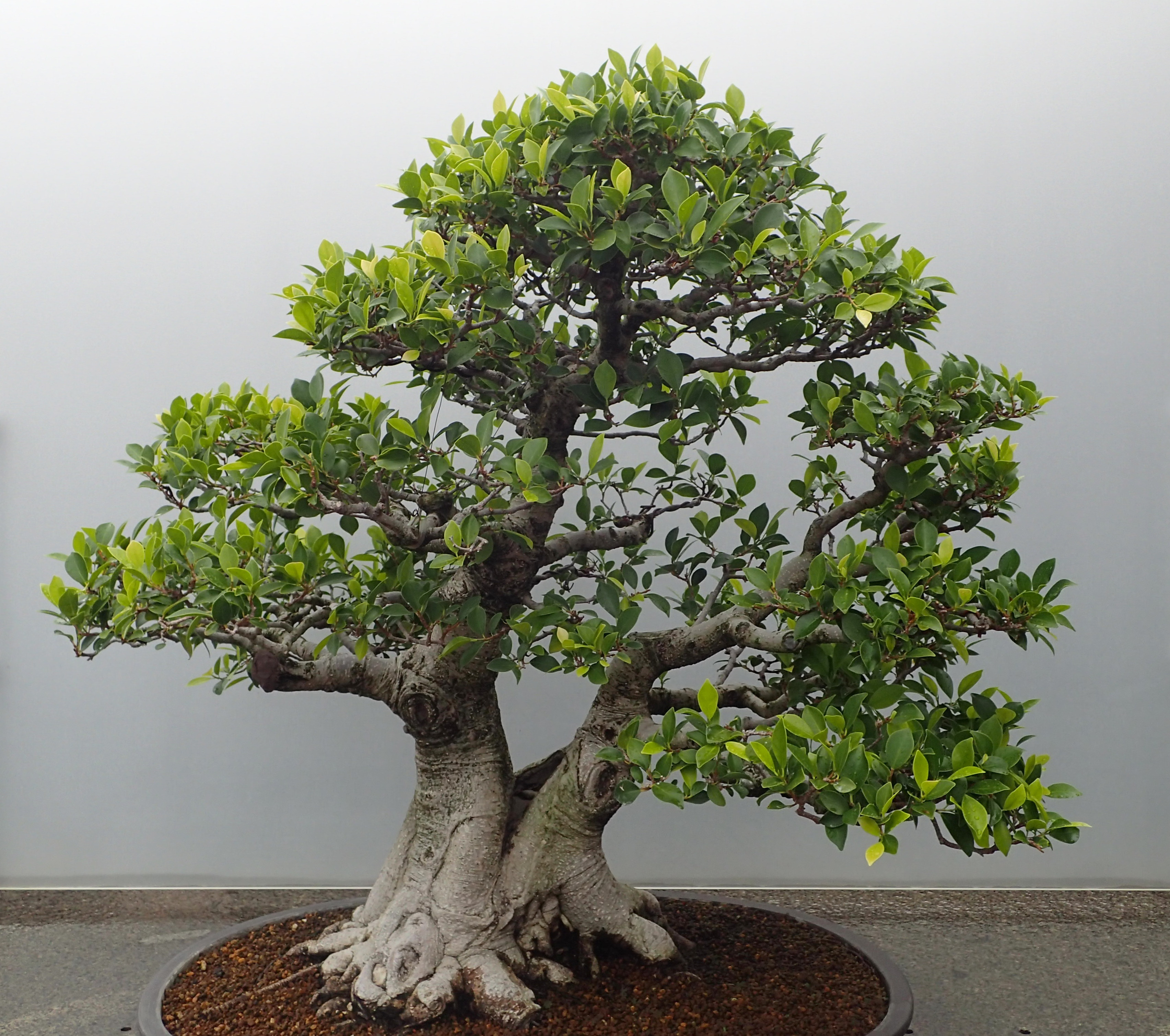
Bonsai

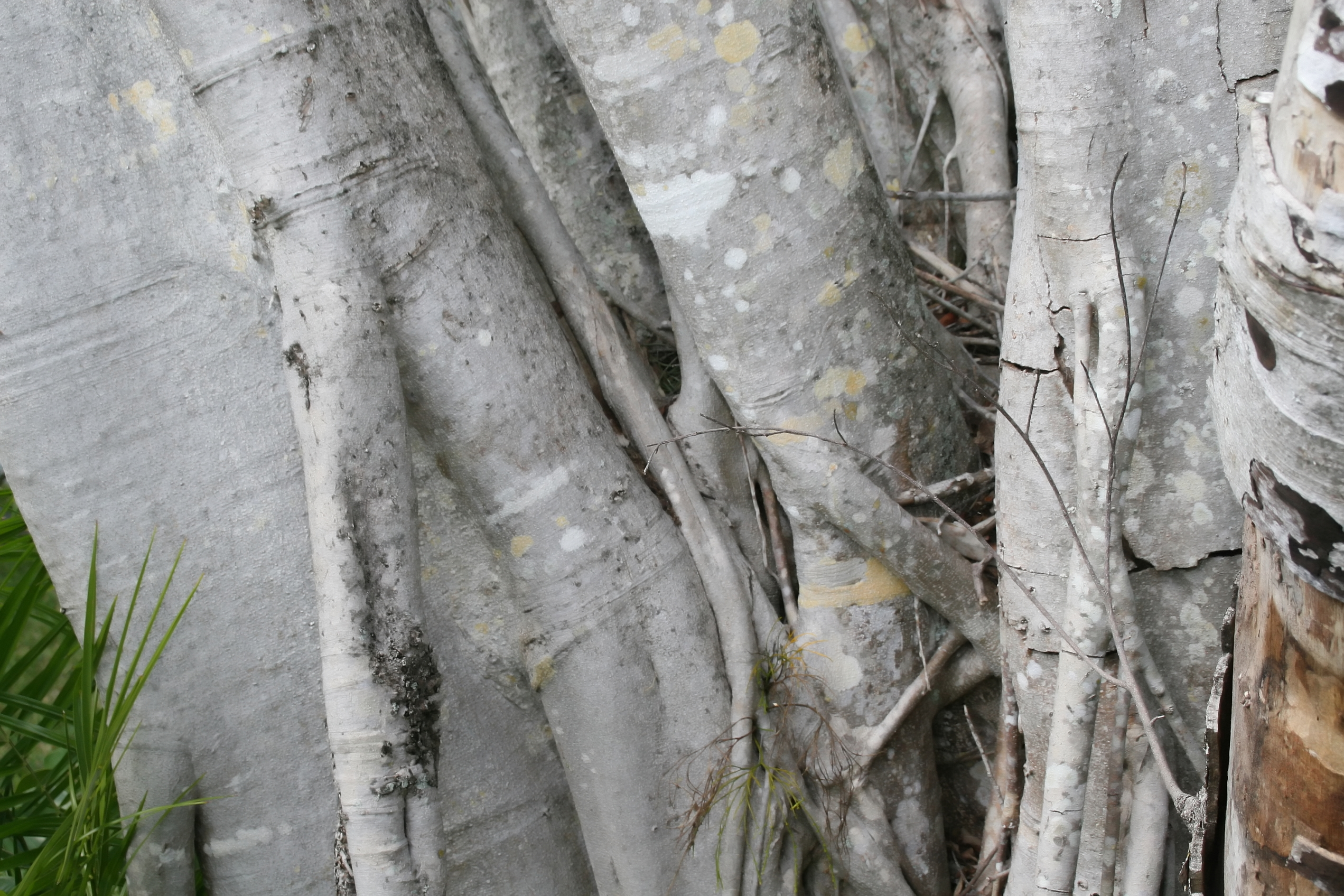
Trunk

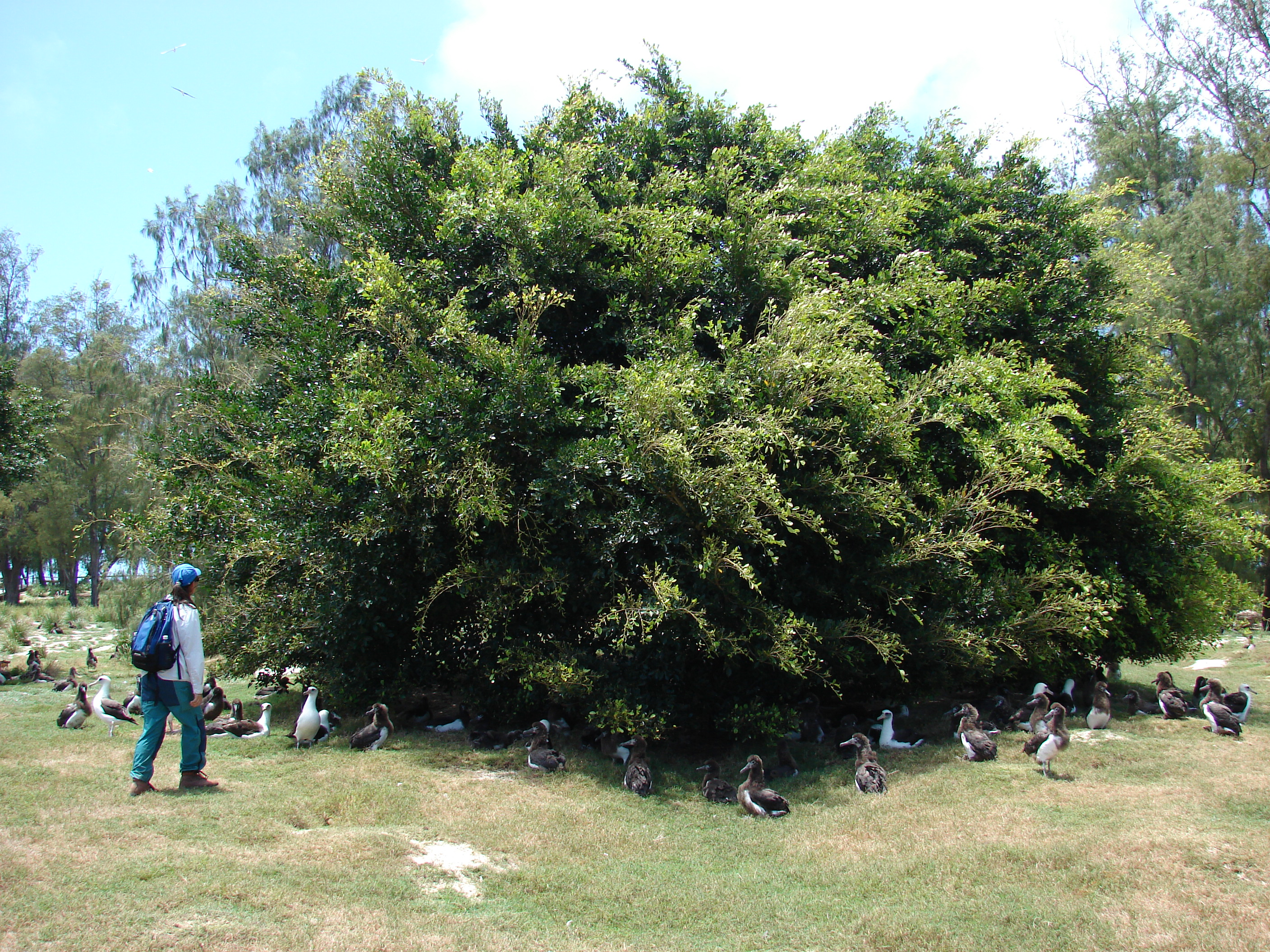
Shrubby tree

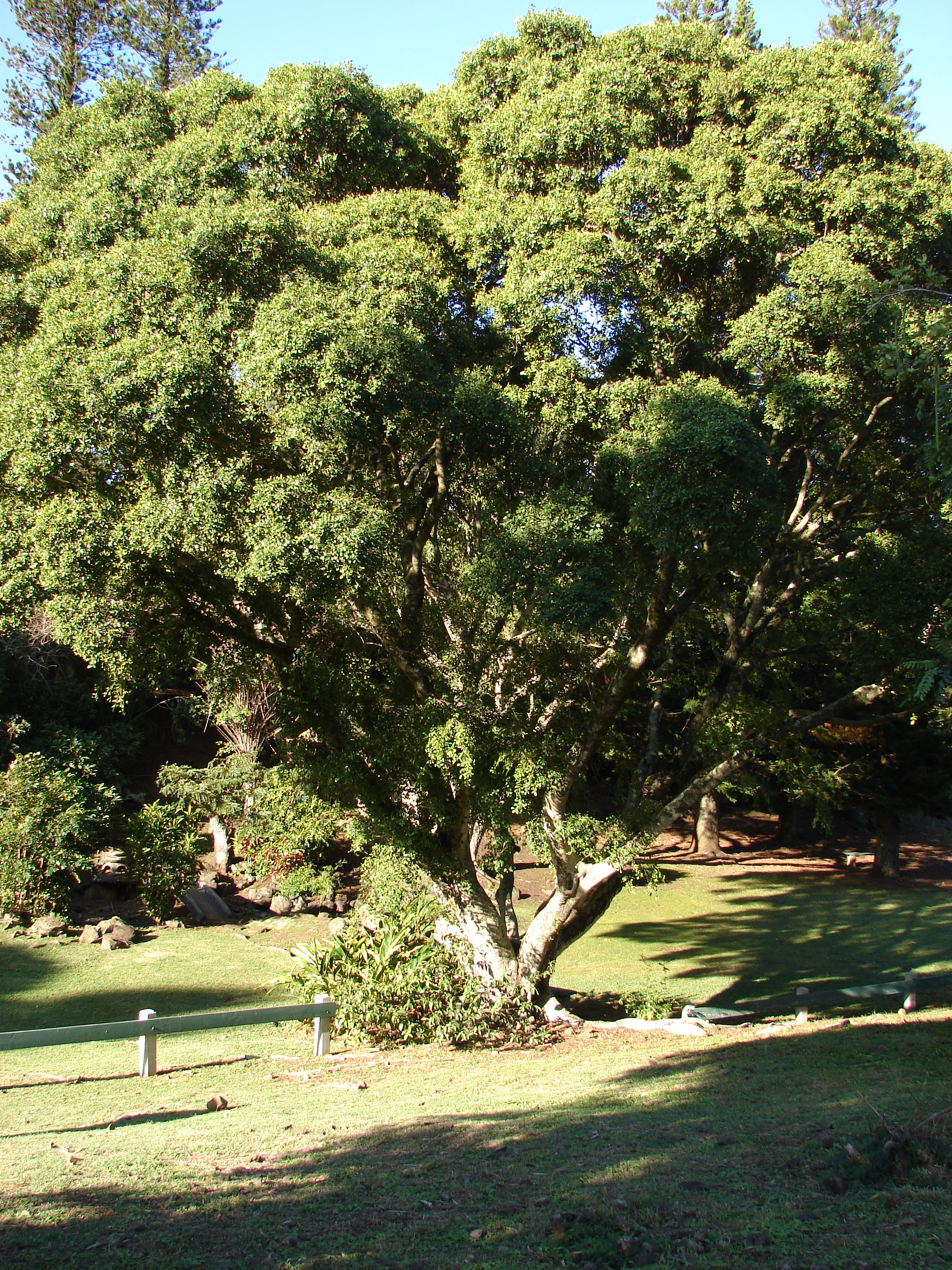
A tree at a park in Hawaii

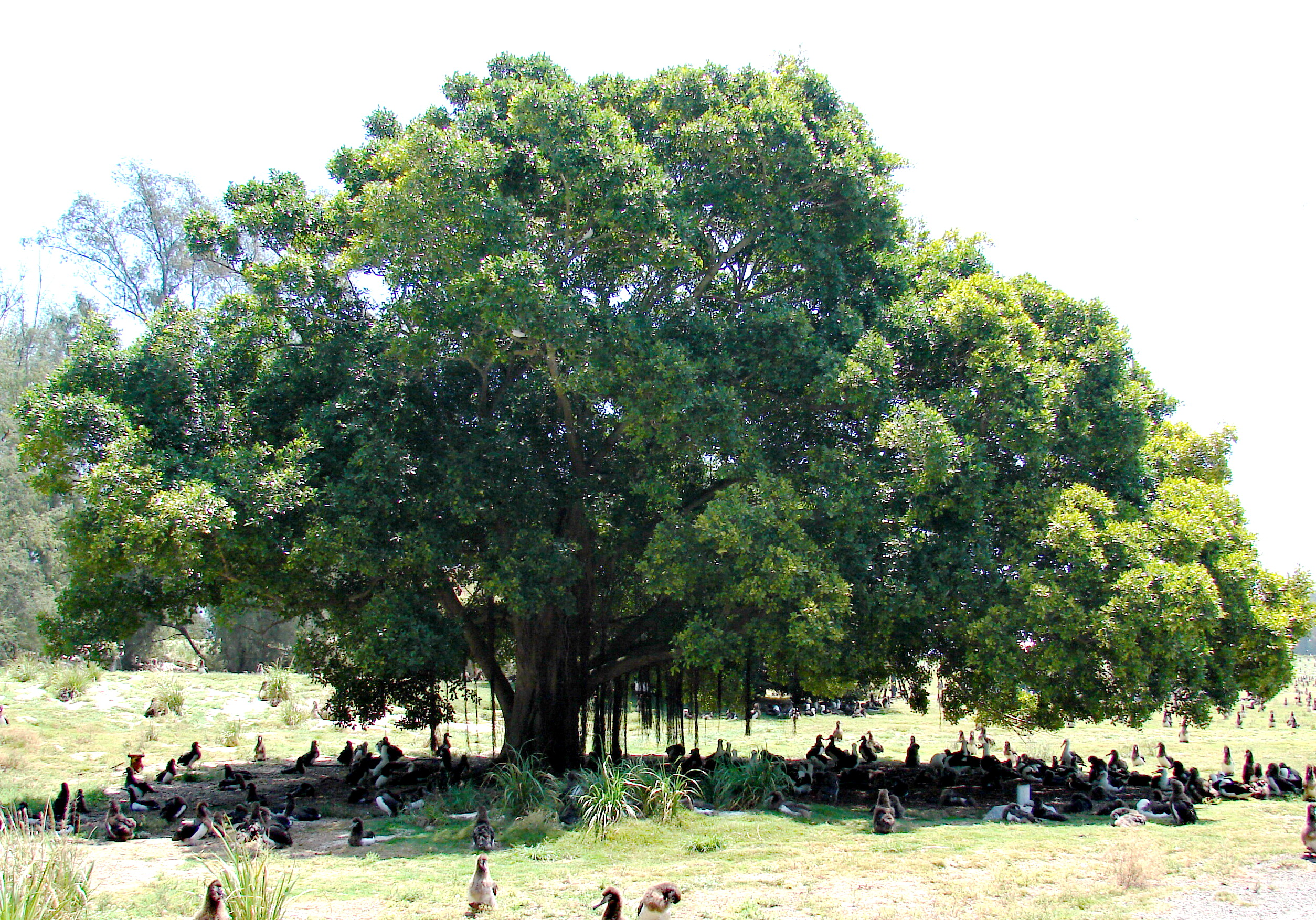
A tree in Midway Atoll

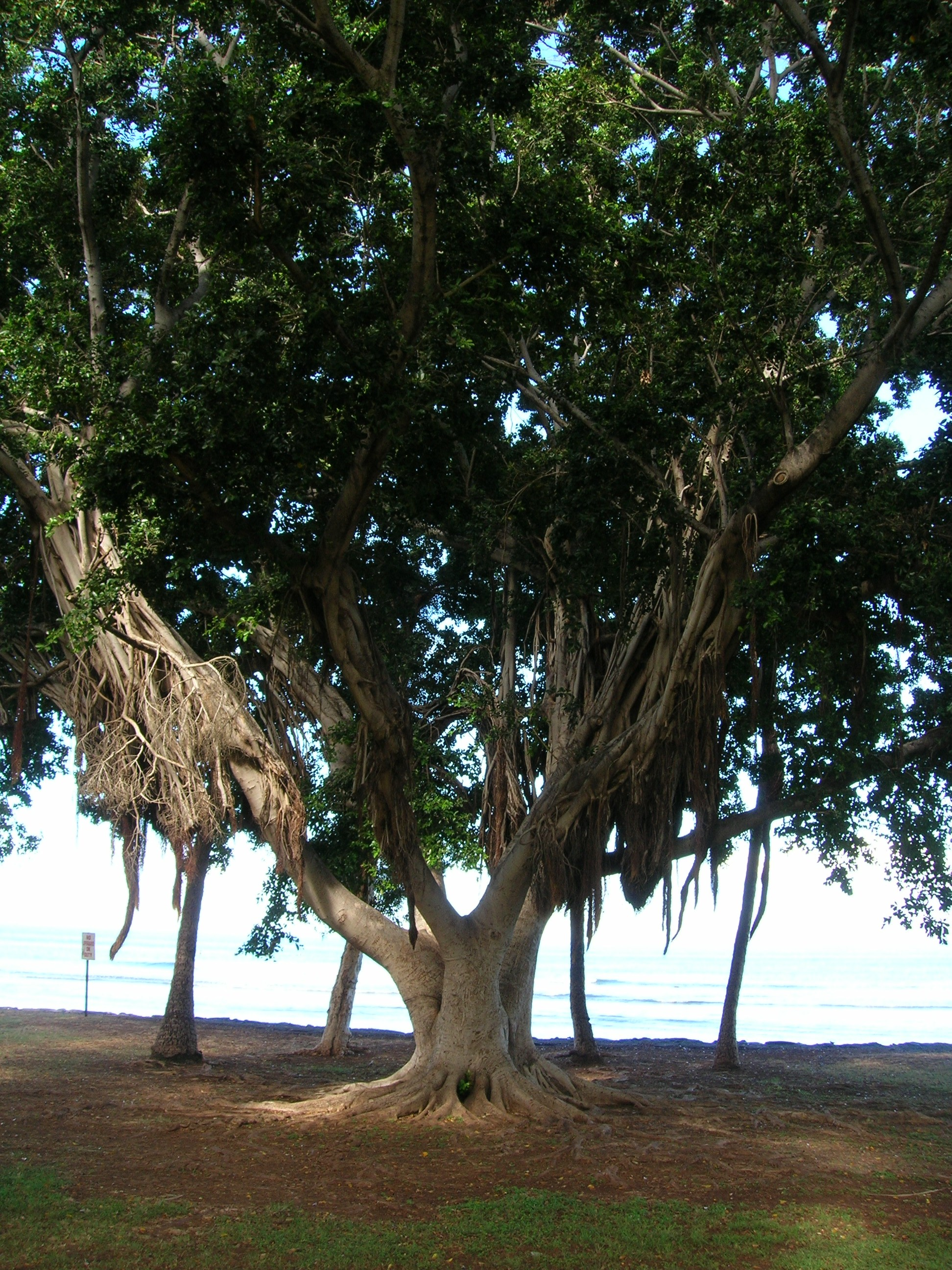
Tree with closeup of branches and trunk

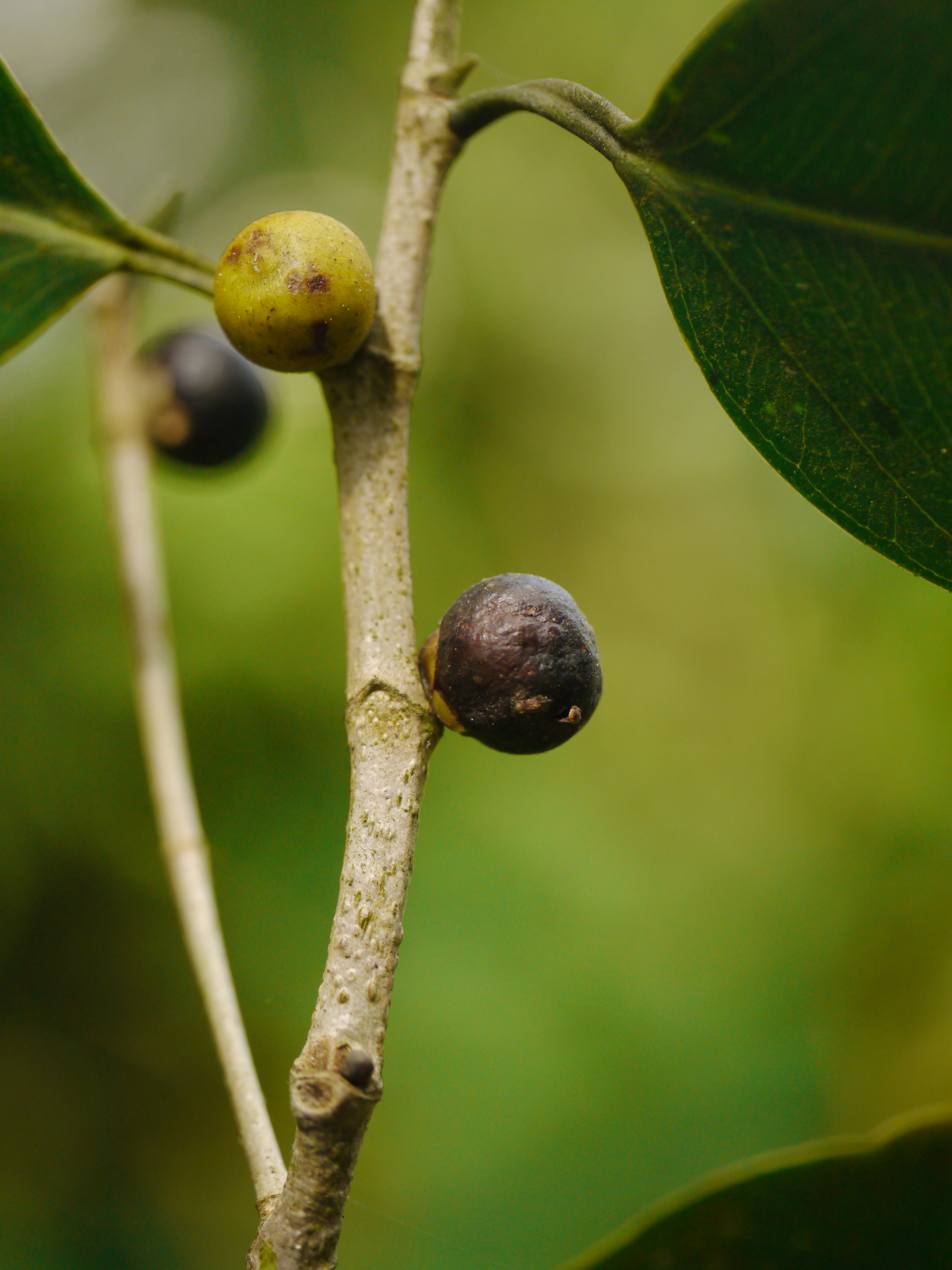
Fruits

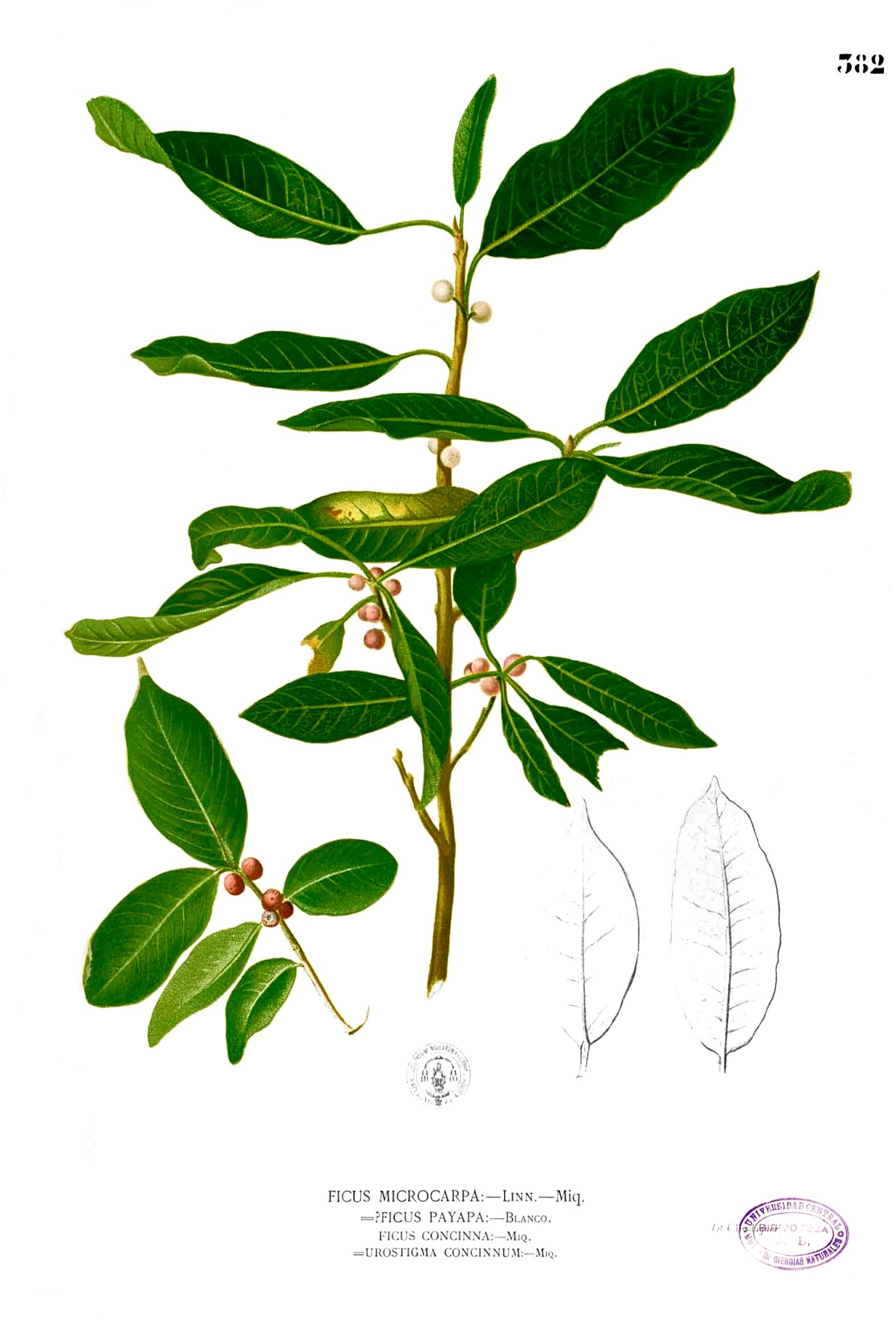
Botanical illustration

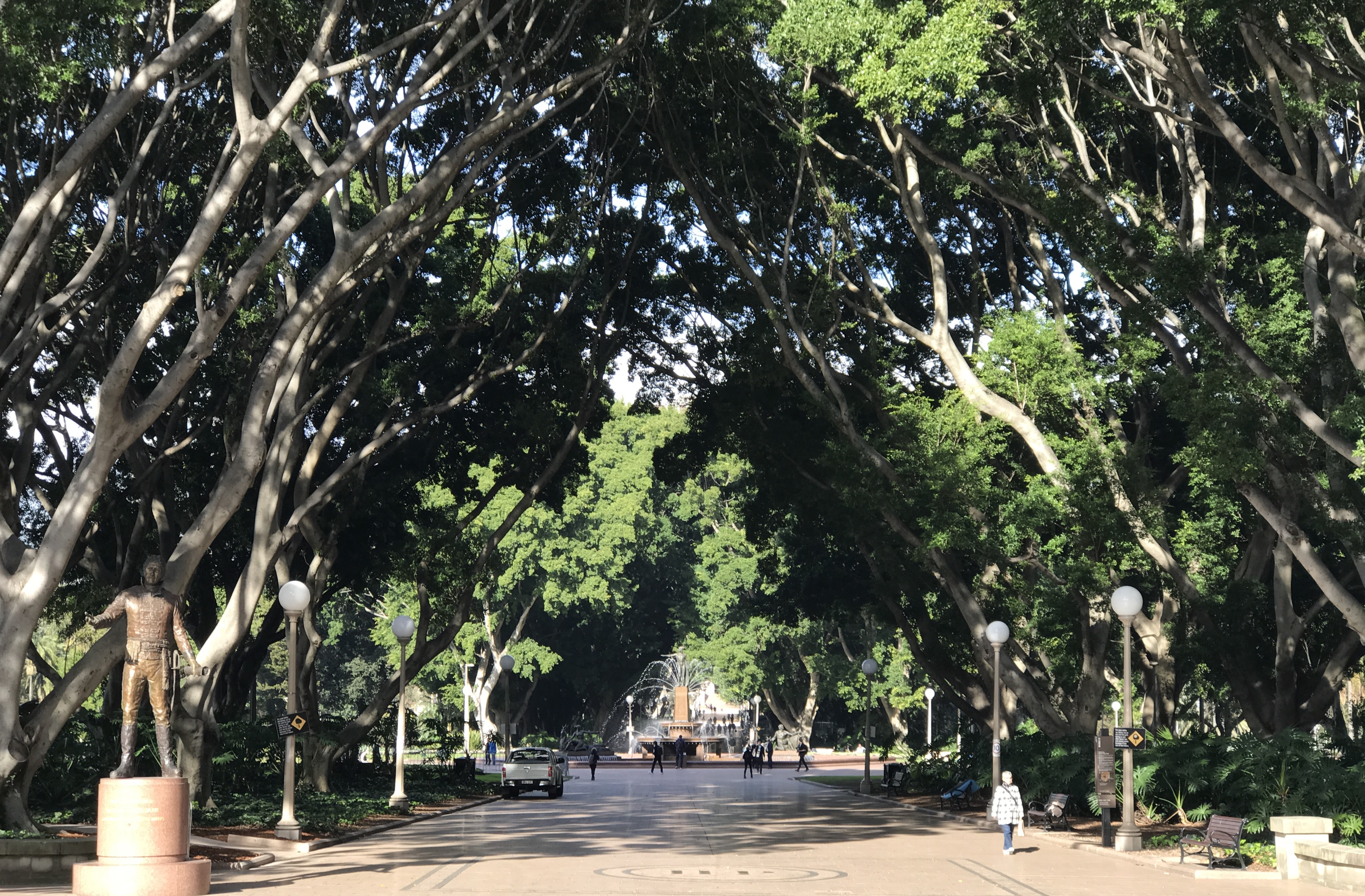
An avenue of Ficus microcarpa in Hyde Park, Sydney

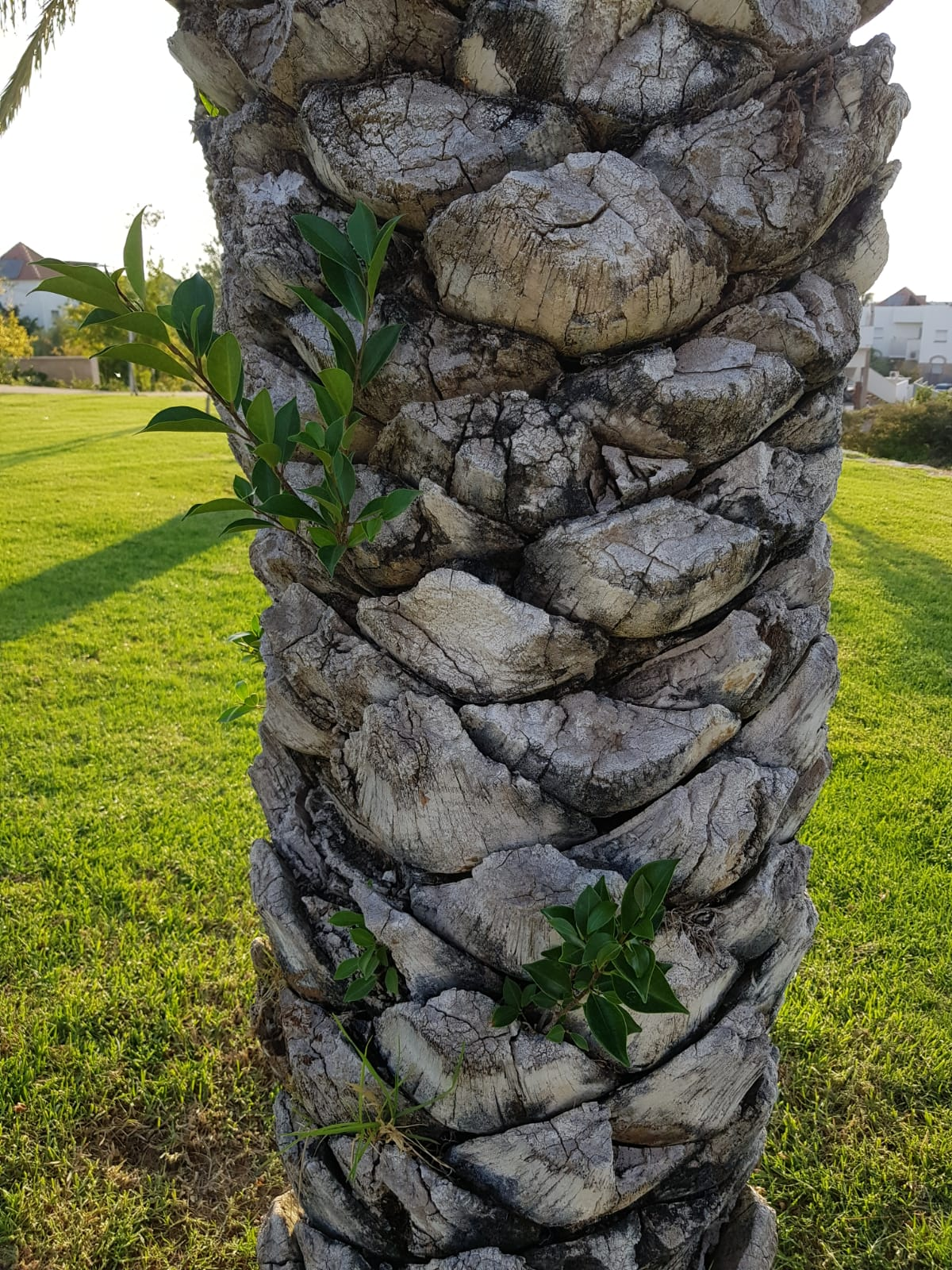
Ficus microcarpa living on Phoenix dactylifera (date palm). It is there due to guano of flying Egyptian fruit bat

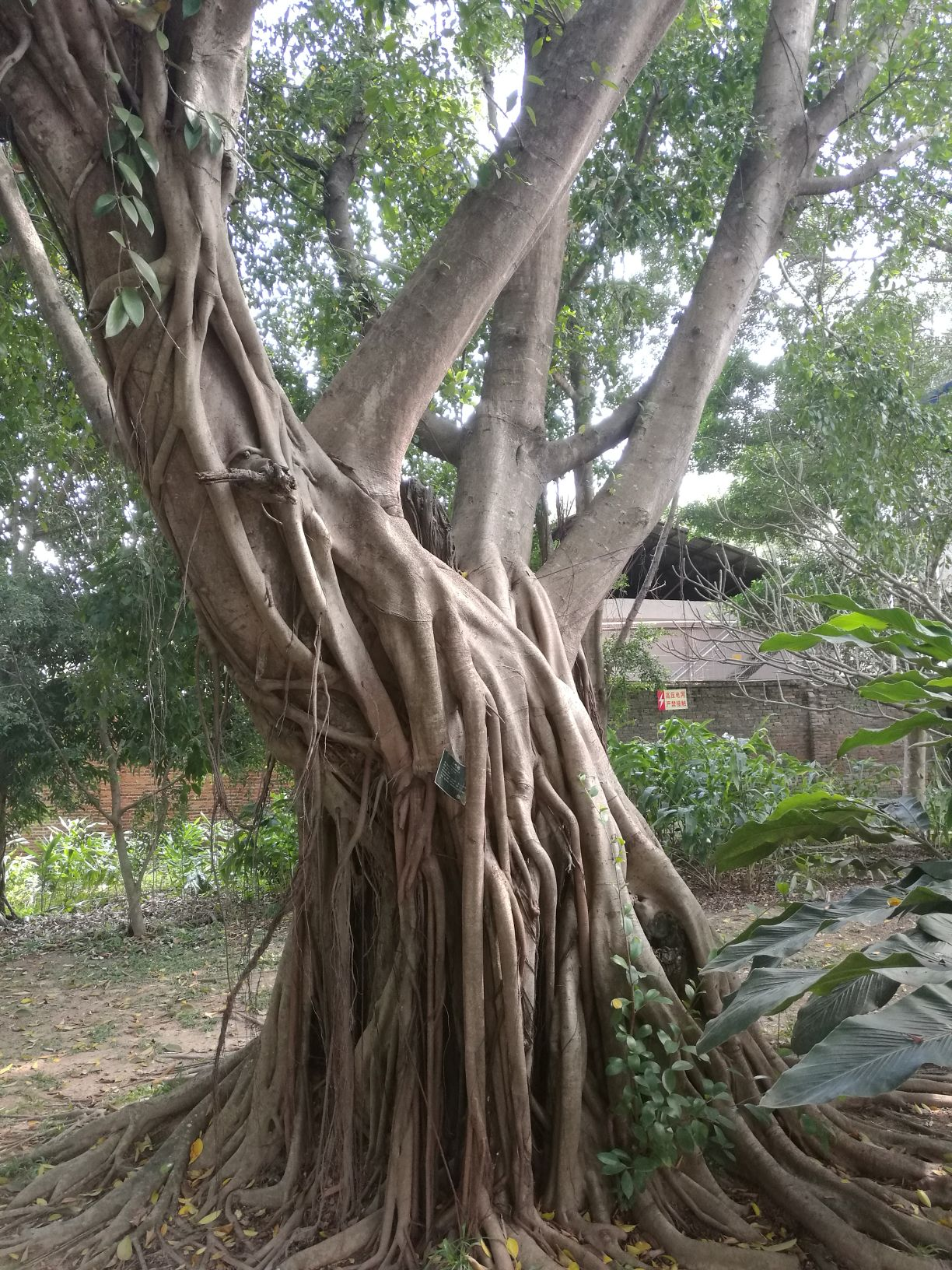
Stem & Habitus

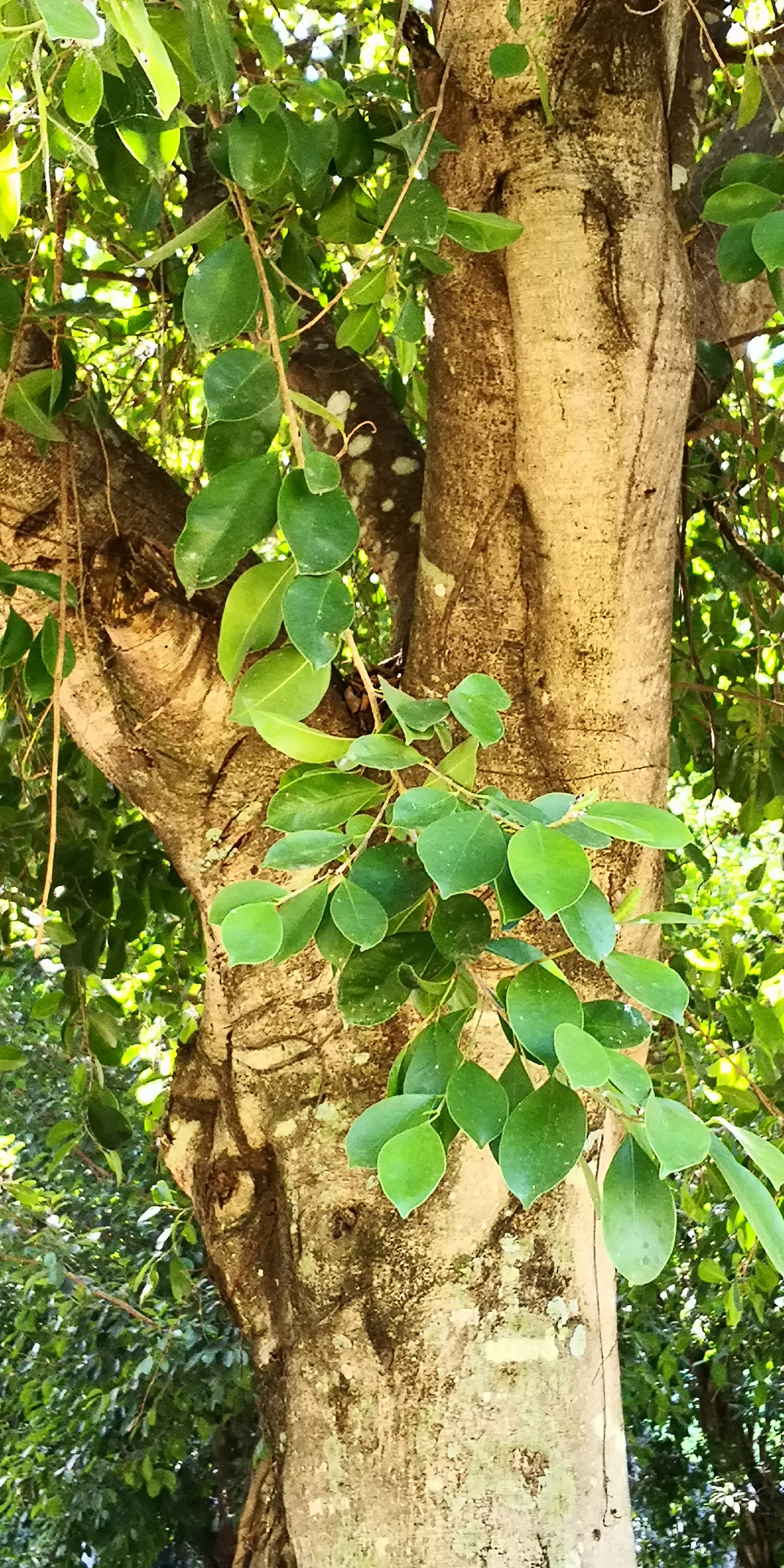
Stem with leaves

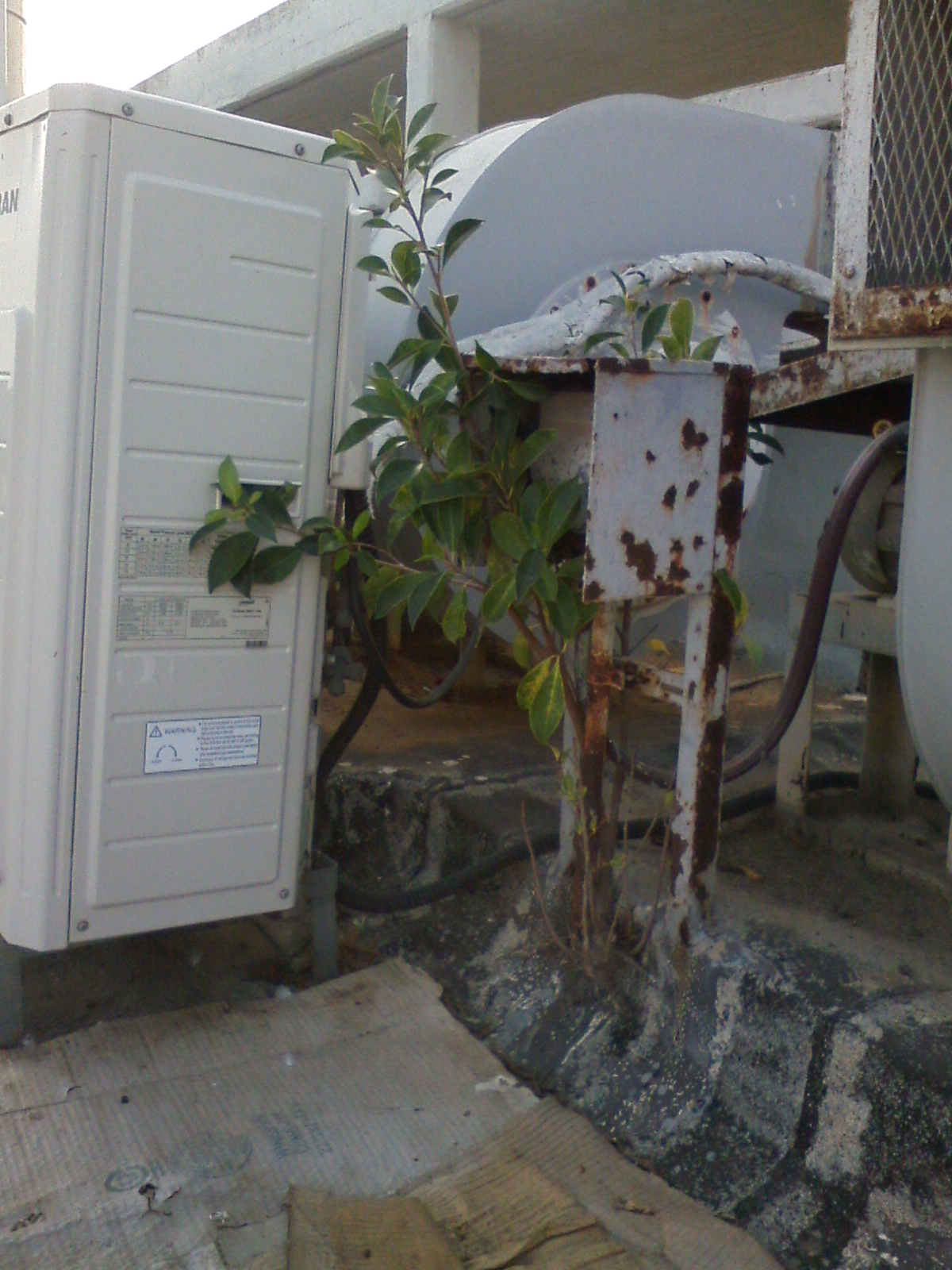
Growing on roof top

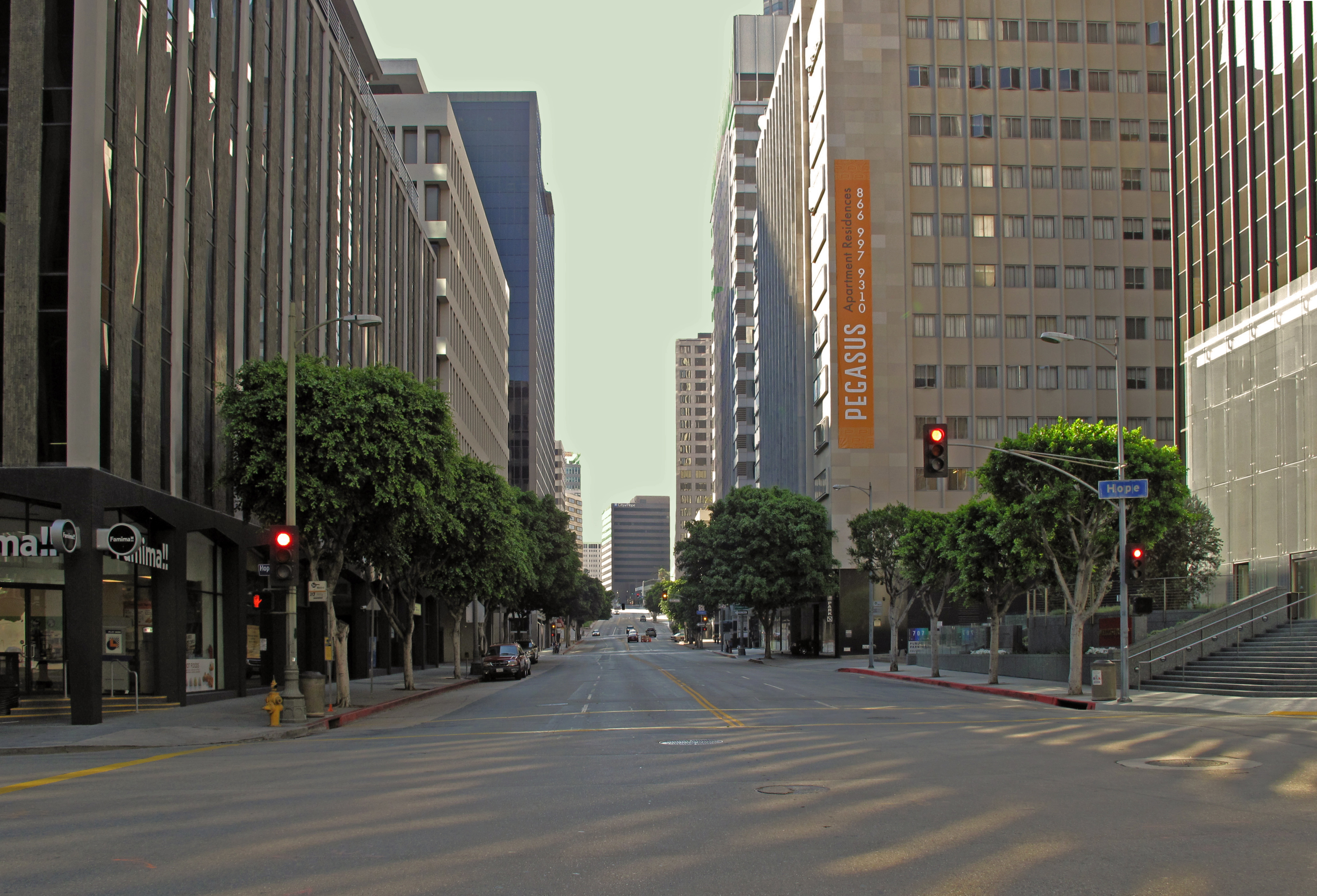
Ficus microcarpa is a common tree seen alongside streets of Los Angeles area and generally its the most common evergreen fig in southern California
