= Sphenomorphus dekkerae =

Scientific classification
- Domain: Eukaryota
- Kingdom: Animalia
- Phylum: Chordata
- Class: Reptilia
- Order: Squamata
- Family: Scincidae
- Genus: Sphenomorphus
- Species: S. dekkerae

Binomial name
- Sphenomorphus dekkerae Shea, 2017

Species of lizard

Sphenomorphus dekkerae is a species of skink found in Indonesia.
