= Sigaloseps ruficauda =

Conservation status
- Critically Endangered (IUCN 3.1)

Scientific classification
- Kingdom: Animalia
- Phylum: Chordata
- Class: Reptilia
- Order: Squamata
- Family: Scincidae
- Genus: Sigaloseps
- Species: S. ruficauda

Binomial name
- Sigaloseps ruficauda Sadlier & Bauer, 1999
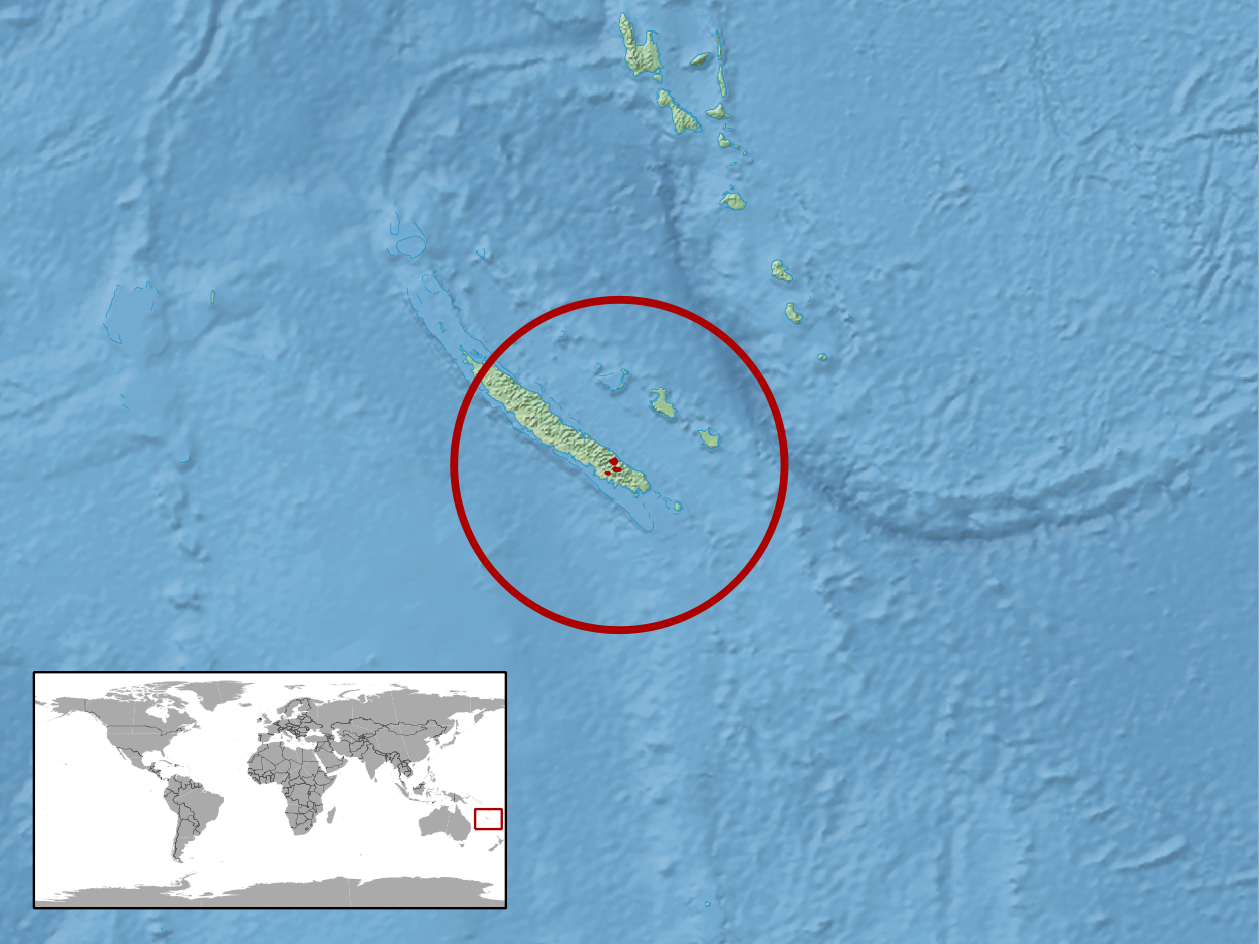

Species of lizard

Sigaloseps ruficauda is a species of skink found in New Caledonia.
