= Sigaloseps ferrugicauda =

Scientific classification
- Kingdom: Animalia
- Phylum: Chordata
- Class: Reptilia
- Order: Squamata
- Family: Scincidae
- Genus: Sigaloseps
- Species: S. ferrugicauda

Binomial name
- Sigaloseps ferrugicauda Sadlier, Smith, Shea, & Bauer, 2014

Species of lizard

Sigaloseps ferrugicauda is a species of skink found in New Caledonia.
