= Sigaloseps conditus =

Scientific classification
- Kingdom: Animalia
- Phylum: Chordata
- Class: Reptilia
- Order: Squamata
- Family: Scincidae
- Genus: Sigaloseps
- Species: S. conditus

Binomial name
- Sigaloseps conditus Sadlier, Bauer, & Wood, 2014

Species of lizard

Sigaloseps conditus is a species of skink that are found in New Caledonia.
