= Cyrtodactylus pronarus =

Scientific classification
- Kingdom: Animalia
- Phylum: Chordata
- Class: Reptilia
- Order: Squamata
- Suborder: Gekkota
- Family: Gekkonidae
- Genus: Cyrtodactylus
- Species: C. pronarus

Binomial name
- Cyrtodactylus pronarus Shea, Couper, Wilmer, & Amey, 2011

Species of lizard

Cyrtodactylus pronarus is a species of gecko that is endemic to the McIlwraith Range in Queensland Australia.
