= Sigaloseps balios =

Scientific classification
- Kingdom: Animalia
- Phylum: Chordata
- Class: Reptilia
- Order: Squamata
- Family: Scincidae
- Genus: Sigaloseps
- Species: S. balios

Binomial name
- Sigaloseps balios Sadlier, Bauer, & Wood, 2014

Species of lizard

Sigaloseps balios is a species of skink found in New Caledonia.
