= Sphenomorphus capitolythos =

Conservation status
- Data Deficient (IUCN 3.1)

Scientific classification
- Kingdom: Animalia
- Phylum: Chordata
- Class: Reptilia
- Order: Squamata
- Family: Scincidae
- Genus: Sphenomorphus
- Species: S. capitolythos

Binomial name
- Sphenomorphus capitolythos Shea & Michels, 2009

Synonyms
- Lygosoma keiensis Kopstein, 1926; Sphenomorphus keiensis (Kopstein, 1926)

Species of lizard

Sphenomorphus capitolythos is a species of skink, a lizard in the subfamily Sphenomorphinae of the family Scincidae. The species is endemic to Indonesia.

== Etymology ==
The specific name, capitolythos, is in honor of Austrian herpetologist Felix Kopstein through a trilingual play on words. Kopf + Stein in German, meaning "head + stone" in English, becomes capito + lythos in Greek.

== Description ==
Medium-sized for its genus, S. capitolythos may attain a snout-to-vent length (SVL) of about 8 cm (3.1 in). It has four short legs.

== Habitat ==
The preferred natural habitat of S. capitolythos is forest.

== Reproduction ==
The mode of reproduction of S. capitolythos is unknown.
