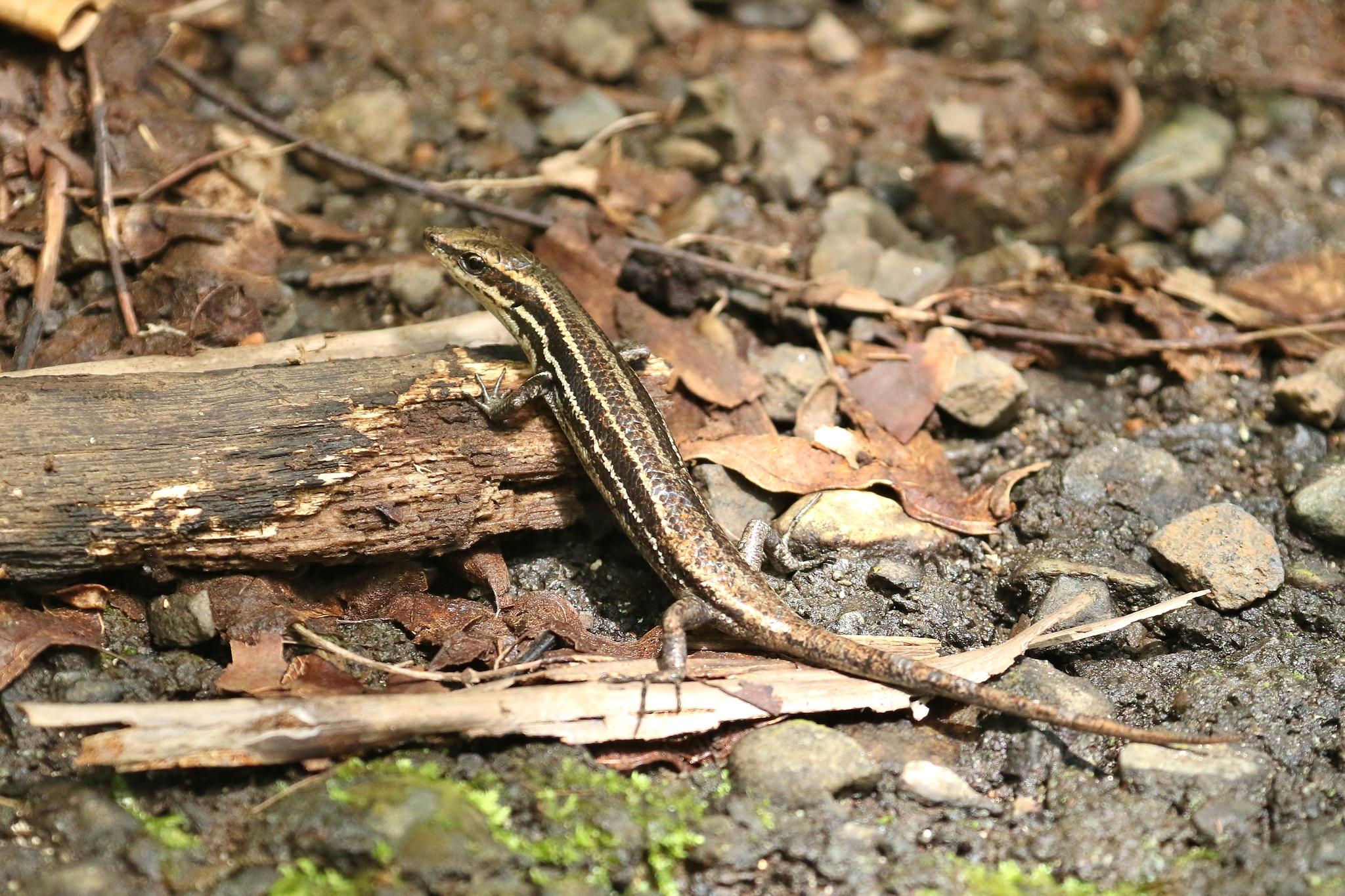

Conservation status
- Least Concern (IUCN 3.1)

Scientific classification
- Kingdom: Animalia
- Phylum: Chordata
- Class: Reptilia
- Order: Squamata
- Family: Scincidae
- Genus: Emoia
- Species: E. jakati

Binomial name
- Emoia jakati (Kopstein, 1926)

= Emoia jakati =

Species of lizard

Emoia jakati, also known commonly as Kopstein's emo skink, is a species of lizard in the family Scincidae. The species is widespread in Oceania.
