= Cyrtodactylus mcdonaldi =

Conservation status
- Least Concern (IUCN 3.1)

Scientific classification
- Kingdom: Animalia
- Phylum: Chordata
- Class: Reptilia
- Order: Squamata
- Suborder: Gekkota
- Family: Gekkonidae
- Genus: Cyrtodactylus
- Species: C. mcdonaldi

Binomial name
- Cyrtodactylus mcdonaldi Shea, Couper, Wilmer & Amey, 2011

Gecko endemic to Queensland, Australia

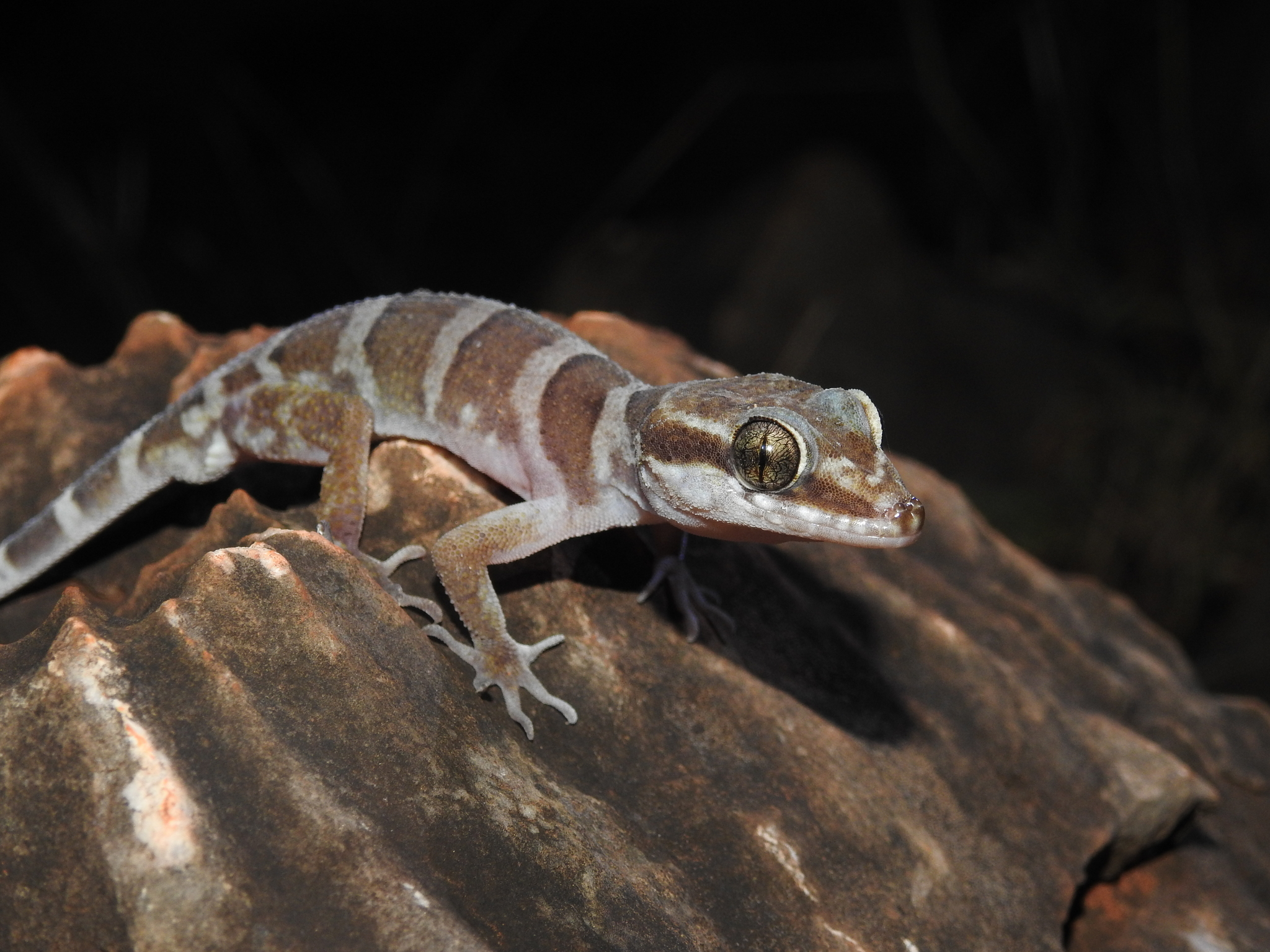
Cyrtodactylus mcdonaldi

Cyrtodactylus mcdonaldi is a species of gecko, a lizard in the family Gekkonidae. The species is endemic to Queensland in Australia.

== Etymology ==
The specific name, mcdonaldi, is in honor of Australian herpetologist Keith R. McDonald.

== Habitat ==
The preferred natural habitats of C. mcdonaldi are forest, rocky areas, savanna, and freshwater wetlands.

== Description ==
Medium-sized for its genus, C. mcdonaldi may attain a snout-to-vent length (SVL) of 10.5 cm (4.1 in).

== Diet ==
C. mcdonaldi preys mainly upon invertebrates such as beetles and their larvae, roaches, spiders, and scorpions.

== Reproduction ==
The mode of reproduction of C. mcdonaldi is unknown.
