= Sébastien René Lenormand =

French lawyer and botanist

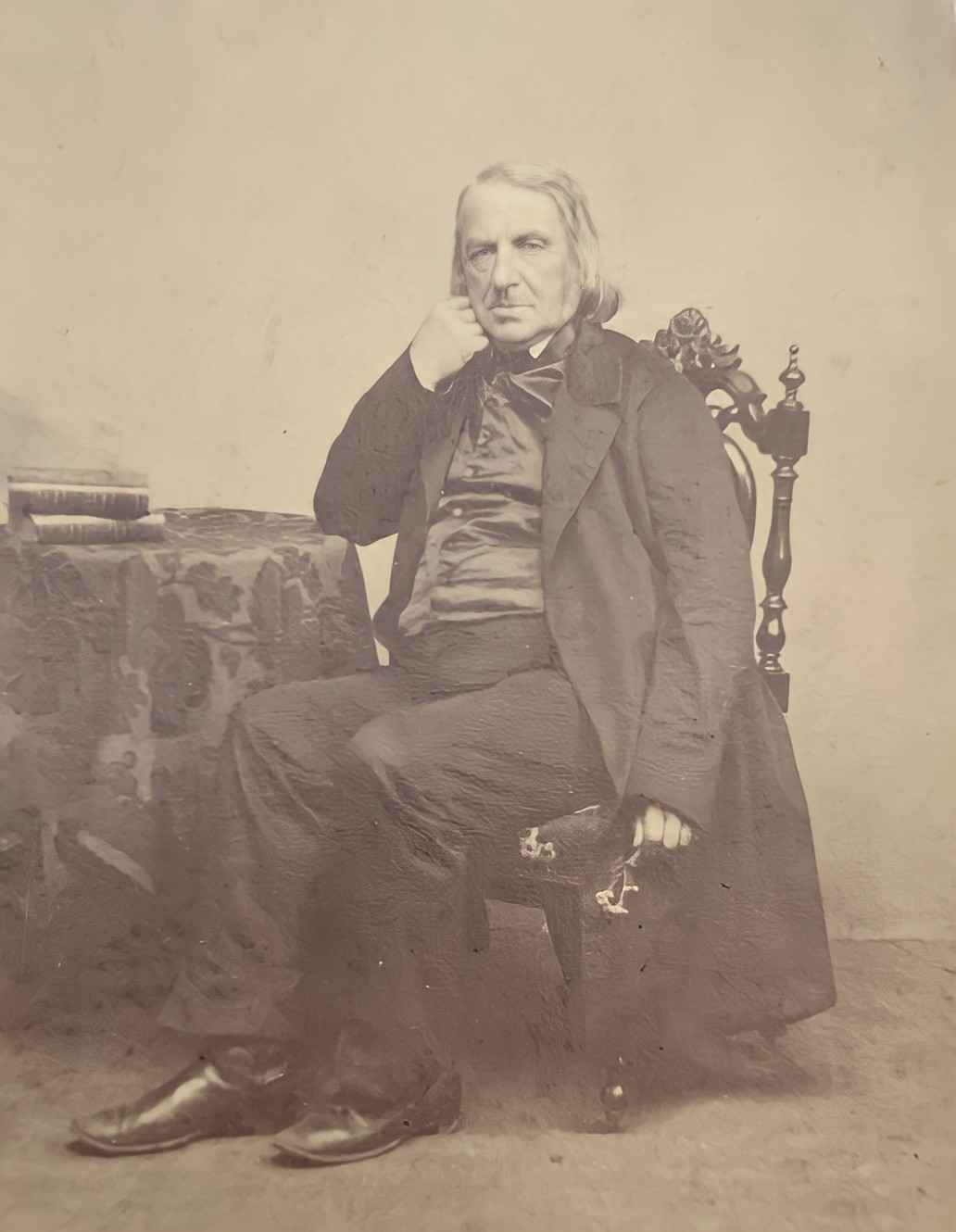

Sébastien René Lenormand (2 April 1796, in Condé-sur-Noireau – 10 December 1871) was a French lawyer and botanist who specialized in the field of phycology.

From 1817 he studied law in Paris, and following graduation (1820), practiced law in the town of Vire. In 1835 he quit the legal profession, moved to an estate called "Lénaudières", from where he focused his energies towards botany. As a botanist, he created an impressive herbarium, consisting mainly of algae species. Although he never left France, he collected a large number of botanical specimens from naturalists who travelled to all parts of the globe. He edited two exsiccatae, Thalissophytes de France. Series I and Thalissophytes de France. Series II.

The algae genus Lenormandia (family Rhodomelaceae) was named in his honor by Otto Wilhelm Sonder in 1845.

Specimens collected by Lenormand are cared for in herbaria worldwide, including the National Museum of Brazil herbarium (MN), the National Museum of Natural History, France (MNHN), the Harvard University herbarium, and the National Herbarium of Victoria (MEL), Royal Botanic Gardens Victoria.

== Written works ==
- Note sur l'emploi du sulfure de carbone pour la conservation des herbiers (1858) – On the usage of sulfur and carbon for preservation of herbaria.
- Catalogue des plantes recueillies a Cayenne (1859, with Émile Deplanche) – Catalog of plants collected in Cayenne.
