= Felix Kopstein =

Austrian-Dutch physician and herpetologist

Felix Kopstein (4 June 1893, Vienna – 14 April 1939, The Hague) was an Austrian-Dutch physician and naturalist, known for his work in the field of herpetology.

From 1913 to 1920, he studied biology and medicine at the University of Vienna, during which time he made the acquaintanceship of zoologist Otto von Wettstein. In 1914 he collected herpetofauna specimens in Albania. From 1921 onward, he was assigned as a physician in the Dutch East Indies, being based on the island of Amboina, from where he made several zoological excursions to New Guinea and throughout the Moluccas. In 1924 he transferred to Java, being employed at the Pasteur Institute in Bandung, while in the meantime conducting studies of lizards and snakes native to the island.

His name is associated with Kopstein's bronzeback snake (Dendrelaphis kopsteini) as well as Kopstein's emo skink (Emoia jakati), a species described by Kopstein in 1926. Also, through a trilingual play on words, he is honored in the specific name of another skink, Sphenomorphus capitolythos, in the following way: capito + lythos (Greek) = "head" + "stone" (English) = Kopf + Stein (German). Frog Callulops kopsteini, also known as Kopstein's callulops frog, is named for him.

== Written works ==
- Zoologische Tropenreise mit Kamera und Feldstecher durch die Indo-Australische Tierwelt, 1928 – Zoological tropical journeys (with camera & binoculars for the study of Indo-Australian wildlife).
- "Observations on the venomous effect of Naja bungarus", published in 1929 in English.
- De Javaansche gifslangen en haar beteekenis voor den mensch, 1930.
- Een zoologische reis door de tropen (ca. 1930).
- "The Javanese black cobra", published in 1930 in English.
- "Collected papers [Reprints of Felix Kopstein]", (1923–1938, in English).
