= Cyrtodactylus adorus =

Scientific classification
- Kingdom: Animalia
- Phylum: Chordata
- Class: Reptilia
- Order: Squamata
- Suborder: Gekkota
- Family: Gekkonidae
- Genus: Cyrtodactylus
- Species: C. adorus

Binomial name
- Cyrtodactylus adorus Shea, Couper, Wilmer & Amey, 2011

Species of lizard

Cyrtodactylus adorus is a species of gecko endemic to Queensland in Australia.
