= Sigaloseps deplanchei =

Conservation status
- Least Concern (IUCN 3.1)

Scientific classification
- Kingdom: Animalia
- Phylum: Chordata
- Class: Reptilia
- Order: Squamata
- Family: Scincidae
- Genus: Sigaloseps
- Species: S. deplanchei

Binomial name
- Sigaloseps deplanchei (Bavay, 1869)
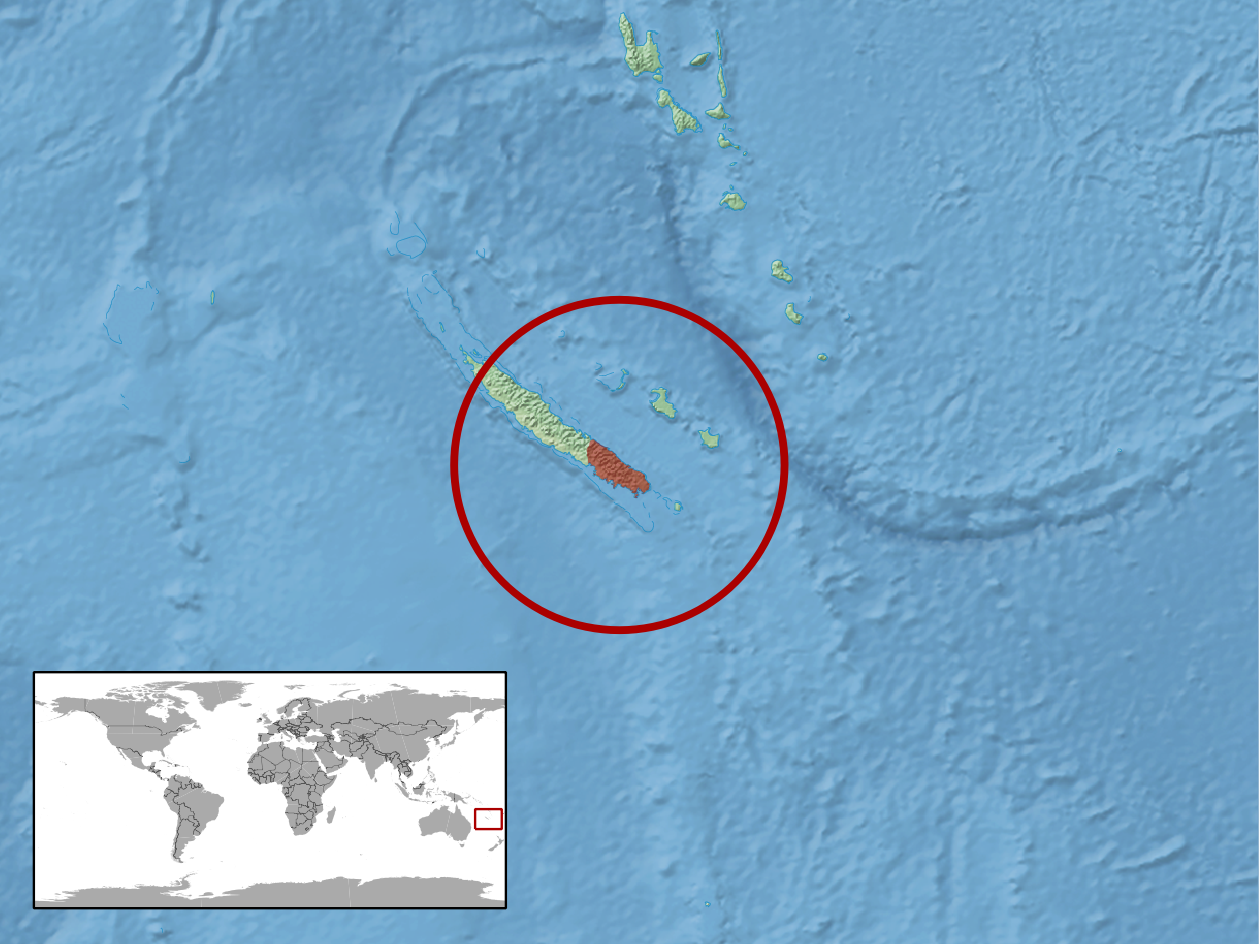

Synonyms
- Lygosoma deplanchei Bavay, 1869; Hinulia tetragonorus Günther, 1872; Mocoa deplanchei — F. Müller, 1880; Lygosoma (Sphenomorphus) deplanchi [sic] — M.A. Smith, 1937; Leiolopisma deplanchei — Zug, 1985; Sigaloseps deplanchei — Sadlier, 1987

Species of lizard

Sigaloseps deplanchei, Deplanche's shiny skink, is a species of lizard in the family Scincidae. The species is endemic to New Caledonia.

== Etymology ==
The specific name, deplanchei, is in honor of French naval surgeon Émile Deplanche.

== Geographic range ==
S. deplanchei is found in South Province, New Caledonia.

== Habitat ==
The preferred natural habitats of S. deplanchei are forest and shrubland, at altitudes up to 1,000 m (3,280 ft).

== Description ==
Medium-sized for the genus Sigaloseps, adults of S. deplanchei have a snout-to-vent length (SVL) of not more than 4.6 cm (1.8 in).

== Reproduction ==
The mode of reproduction of S. deplanchei is unknown.
