= Cyrtodactylus hoskini =

Conservation status
- Least Concern (IUCN 3.1)

Scientific classification
- Kingdom: Animalia
- Phylum: Chordata
- Class: Reptilia
- Order: Squamata
- Suborder: Gekkota
- Family: Gekkonidae
- Genus: Cyrtodactylus
- Species: C. hoskini

Binomial name
- Cyrtodactylus hoskini Shea, Couper, Wilmer & Amey, 2011

Gecko endemic to Queensland, Australia

Cyrtodactylus hoskini is a species of gecko, a lizard in the family Gekkonidae. The species is endemic to Australia.

== Etymology ==
The specific name, hoskini, is in honor of Australian herpetologist Conrad J. Hoskin.

== Geographic range ==
C. hoskini is found in northern Queensland, Australia.

== Habitat ==
The preferred natural habitats of C. hoskini are forest and rocky areas.

== Description ==
Large for its genus, C. hoskini may attain a snout-to-vent length (SVL) of 11.2 cm (4.4 in).

== Reproduction ==
The mode of reproduction of C. hoskini is unknown.
