= Sigaloseps pisinnus =

Scientific classification
- Kingdom: Animalia
- Phylum: Chordata
- Class: Reptilia
- Order: Squamata
- Family: Scincidae
- Genus: Sigaloseps
- Species: S. pisinnus

Binomial name
- Sigaloseps pisinnus Sadlier, Shea, Whitaker, Bauer, & Wood, 2014

Species of lizard

Sigaloseps pisinnus is a species of skink found in New Caledonia.
