= Dendrelaphis kopsteini =

Conservation status
- Least Concern (IUCN 3.1)

Scientific classification
- Kingdom: Animalia
- Phylum: Chordata
- Class: Reptilia
- Order: Squamata
- Suborder: Serpentes
- Family: Colubridae
- Subfamily: Ahaetuliinae
- Genus: Dendrelaphis
- Species: D. kopsteini

Binomial name
- Dendrelaphis kopsteini G. Vogel & van Rooijen, 2007

Species of snake

Dendrelaphis kopsteini, also known commonly as Kopstein's bronzeback snake, is a species of snake in the subfamily Ahaetuliinae of the family Colubridae. The species is native to Southeast Asia.

== Etymology ==
The specific name, kopsteini, is in honor of Felix Kopstein, who was an Austrian physician and naturalist, and did field work in the Dutch East Indies.

== Description ==
D. kopsteini is the only species in its genus with red coloration on the anterior part of the body. The dorsal scales are arranged in 15 rows at midbody. The ventrals number 167–181, and the subcaudals number 140–154.

== Geographic range ==
D. kopsteini is found in Brunei, Indonesia, Peninsular Malaysia, Singapore, and Thailand.

== Habitat ==
The preferred natural habitat of D. kopsteini is forest, at altitudes from sea level to 624 m (2,047 ft), but it has also been found in artificial habitats such as village gardens.

== Behavior ==
D. kopsteini is arboreal and diurnal.

== Diet ==
D. kopsteini preys predominately upon lizards, and to a lesser extent upon frogs.

== Reproduction ==
D. kopsteini is oviparous.
