= Anilios nema =

Scientific classification
- Kingdom: Animalia
- Phylum: Chordata
- Class: Reptilia
- Order: Squamata
- Suborder: Serpentes
- Family: Typhlopidae
- Genus: Anilios
- Species: A. nema

Binomial name
- Anilios nema (Shea & Horner, 1997)

Synonyms
- Ramphotyphlops nema Shea & Horner, 1997; Austrotyphlops nema Wallach, 2006

Species of Australian blind snake

Anilios nema, also known as the thread-like blind snake, is a species of blind snake that is endemic to Australia. The specific epithet nema (“thread”) refers to the snake's slender body.

== Description ==
The snake grows to an average of about 27 cm in length.

== Behaviour ==
The species is oviparous.

== Distribution ==
The species occurs in the vicinity of Darwin, in the tropical Top End of the Northern Territory. The type locality is Fannie Bay, a Darwin suburb.
