= Glenn Michael Shea =

Australian herpetologist (born 1961)

- Born: February 5, 1961 (age 65)
- Known for: Systematics and biology of reptiles and amphibians in Australasia
- Scientific career
- Fields: Herpetology, Anatomy, Veterinary medicine
- Workplaces: University of Sydney

Glenn Michael Shea, often written as Glenn M. Shea, (born 5 February 1961) is an Australian herpetologist and veterinary anatomist.

== Biography ==
Shea earned his Bachelor of Veterinary Science (BVSc) with honors in 1983 from the University of Sydney. In 1992, he received his Ph.D. from the same institution with the dissertation The systematics and reproduction of bluetongue lizards of the genus Tiliqua (Squamata: Scincidae).

Since 1985 he has been a Senior Lecturer in veterinary anatomy at the Sydney School of Veterinary Science, University of Sydney, where he teaches the anatomy of horses, birds, and wildlife, as well as the male genitalia and respiratory system of domestic animals. His research focuses on the systematics and biology of reptiles and amphibians of the Australasian region, especially skinks, legless lizards, and blind snakes of Australia and New Guinea.

Shea is a research associate at the Australian Museum and the Queensland Museum, librarian and life member of the Australian Herpetological Society, and a member of the Skink Specialist Group of the IUCN.

His studies, based on visits to museum collections worldwide, have resulted in over 180 publications. These include the books Reptiles and Amphibians (2002), Encyclopedia of Discovery: Reptiles and Insects (2003), Field Guide to Reptiles of New South Wales (2004, with Gerry Swan and Ross Allen Sadlier), and The Action Plan for Australian Lizards and Snakes 2017 (2019, with David Chapple, Reid Tingley, Nicola Mitchell, Stewart Macdonald, J. Scott Keogh, Philip Bowles, Neil Cox, and John Woinarski).

From 2003 to 2009 he served on the Non-Indigenous Animals Advisory Committee of the Department of Agriculture of the Government of New South Wales. He is a former treasurer of the Australian Society of Herpetologists, editor of the Australian herpetological journal Herpetofauna, and was involved in the first action plan for Australian reptiles (1993). From 1991 to 1994 he was a member of the first Australasian Reptile and Amphibian Specialist Group of the IUCN SSC.

Shea is among the describers of 27 reptile species and one frog species.

== Species described ==
Since 1987, Shea has been the author or co-author of the following species descriptions:

- Anilios fossor (Shea, 2015)
- Anilios nema (Shea & Horner, 1997)
- Bavayia goroensis (Bauer, Jackman, Sadlier, Shea & Whitaker, 2008)
- Bavayia nubila (Bauer, Sadlier, Jackman & Shea, 2012)
- Coggeria naufragus (Couper, Covacevich, Marsterson & Shea, 1996)
- Cyclodomorphus celatus (Shea & Miller, 1995)
- Cyclodomorphus praealtus (Shea, 1995)
- Cyclodomorphus venustus (Shea & Miller, 1995)
- Cyrtodactylus adorus (Shea, Couper, Wilmer & Amey, 2011)
- Cyrtodactylus hoskini (Shea, Couper, Wilmer & Amey, 2011)
- Cyrtodactylus mcdonaldi (Shea, Couper, Wilmer & Amey, 2011)
- Cyrtodactylus pronarus (Shea, Couper, Wilmer & Amey, 2011)
- Delma labialis (Shea, 1987)
- Delma mitella (Shea, 1987)
- Delma petersoni (Shea, 1991)
- Demansia quaesitor (Shea, 2007)
- Demansia shinei (Shea, 2007)
- Lacertoides pardalis (Sadlier, Shea & Bauer, 1997)
- Lerista quadrivincula (Shea, 1991)
- Notaden weigeli (Shea & Johnston, 1988)
- Phaeoscincus ouinensis (Sadlier, Shea & Bauer, 2014)
- Saltuarius kateae (Couper, Sadlier, Shea & Worthington-Wilmer, 2008)
- Saltuarius moritzi (Couper, Sadlier, Shea & Worthington-Wilmer, 2008)
- Sigaloseps ferrugicauda (Sadlier, Smith, Shea & Bauer, 2014)
- Sigaloseps pisinnus (Sadlier, Shea, Whitaker, Bauer & Wood, 2014)
- Sphenomorphus capitolythos (Shea & Michels, 2009)
- Sphenomorphus dekkerae (Shea, 2017)
- Sphenomorphus fuscolineatus (Greer & Shea, 2004)

== Eponyms ==
In 1994, Patrick J. Couper named the gecko species Nephrurus sheai (family Carphodactylidae) in honor of Glenn M. Shea.
