= Émile Deplanche =

French physician and naturalist

- Born: June 22, 1824; Argentan, France
- Died: March 30, 1874 (aged 49); France
- Education: University of Caen
- Known for: Natural history exploration of New Caledonia and French Guiana.
- Awards: Chevalier de la Légion d'honneur
- Scientific career
- Fields: Medicine, Natural history, Botany, Zoology
- Author abbrev. (botany): Deplanche

Émile Deplanche (22 June 1824 in Argentan – 30 March 1874) was a French medical doctor and naturalist.

He studied medicine and zoology in Caen. In 1854 he served as a surgeon in the Crimean War, and later the same year, he travelled as a surgeon to Cayenne, Guyane. Here he distinguished himself as a physician, dealing with a yellow fever epidemic that had ravaged the colony (1855). While in Guyane, he collected numerous zoological and botanical specimens. After spending a period of recovery time in France, he embarked on a ship to Tahiti, where he collected malacological and ornithological specimens.

In 1858 he travelled to New Caledonia, where with botanist Eugène Vieillard, he explored little-known regions of the island. The following year, he departed the colony with a large collection of natural history specimens — birds from the expedition were later studied by ornithologists Jules Verreaux and Marc Athanase Parfait Oeillet Des Murs. After his return to France, he worked on "Essais sur la Nouvelle Caledonie", a book co-authored with Vieillard, and first published in 1863. Subsequently, he returned to New Caledonia with Vieillard, where in Noumea, the pair split company, with Deplanche journeying to Lifou in the Loyalty Islands. Because of sickness, he returned to France in March 1867.

Deplanche was a chevalier in the Legion d'honneur and a correspondent-member of the Vienna Academy of Sciences. With phycologist Sébastien René Lenormand, he was co-author of "Catalogue des plantes recueillies à Cayenne" (Catalog of plants collected in Cayenne, 1858).

== Eponymy ==
- Deplanche's lorikeet, Trichoglossus haematodus deplanchii, described by Verreaux and Des Murs, sometimes considered a subspecies of the rainbow lorikeet.
- Deplanchea, a botanical genus in the family Bignoniaceae, described by Eugène Vieillard.
- Sigaloseps deplanchei, a species of scincid lizard, described by Bavay.
