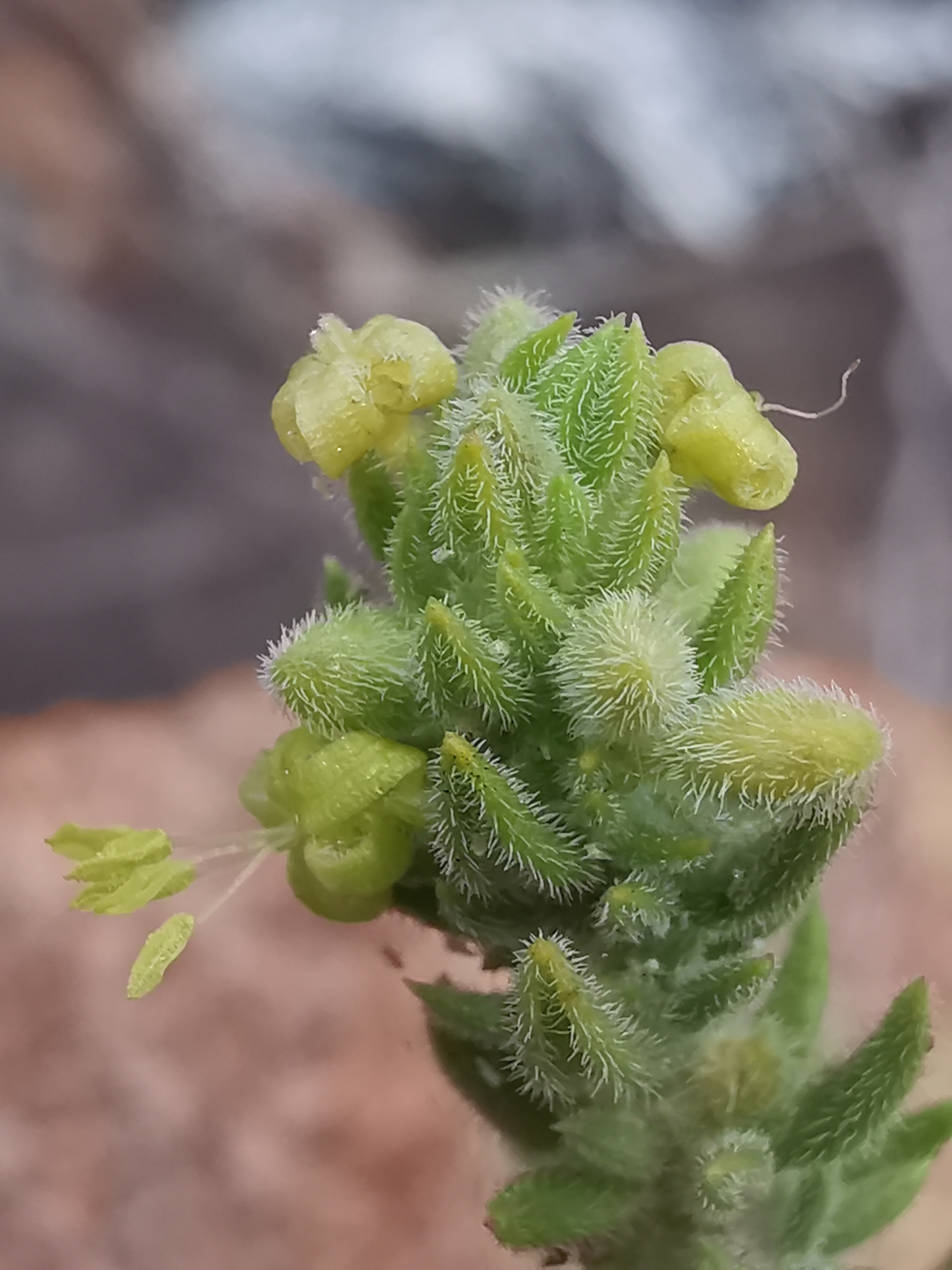
- Anthospermum hispidulum

Scientific classification
- Kingdom: Plantae
- Clade: Tracheophytes
- Clade: Angiosperms
- Clade: Eudicots
- Clade: Asterids
- Order: Gentianales
- Family: Rubiaceae
- Subfamily: Rubioideae
- Tribe: Anthospermeae; Cham. & Schltdl. ex DC.

= Anthospermeae =

Tribe of plants

Anthospermeae is a tribe of flowering plants in the family Rubiaceae and contains 208 species in 12 genera. The range of the tribe is almost only Gondwanan, being found in the Afrotropics, the Neotropics, and Australasia; slight exceptions include Nertera granadensis (whose range may however be due to human cultivation) and a few species of Coprosma, which stretch into Indomalaya; and Phyllis is found in Macaronesia, northwest of Africa. At least two genera, namely Coprosma and Galopina are anemophilous.

== Genera ==
Currently accepted names

- Anthospermum L. (39 sp) — Afrotropics
- Carpacoce Sond. (7 sp) — Cape Floristic Region
- Coprosma J.R.Forst. & G.Forst. (110 sp) — Australasia and Malay Archipelago, but most live in New Zealand or other parts of Polynesia.
- Durringtonia R.J.F.Hend. & Guymer (1 sp) — Australia
- Galopina Thunb. (4 sp) — southern Africa
- Leptostigma Arn. (7 sp) — Australasia and South America
- Nenax Gaertn. (9 sp) — southern Africa
- Nertera Banks ex Sol. (10 sp) — Australasia and Malay Archipelago
- Normandia Hook.f. (1 sp) — New Caledonia
- Opercularia Gaertn. (17 sp) — Australia
- Phyllis L. (2 sp) — Macaronesia
- Pomax Sol. ex DC. (1 sp) — Australia

Synonyms

- Ambraria Cruse = Nenax
- Ambraria Heist. ex Fabr. = Anthospermum
- Bupleuroides Moench = Phyllis
- Caprosma G.Don = Coprosma
- Corynula Hook.f. = Leptostigma
- Cryptospermum Young = Opercularia
- Cunina C.Gay = Nertera
- Erythrodanum Thouars = Nertera
- Eurynome DC. = Coprosma
- Gomozia Mutis ex L.f. = Nertera
- Lagotis E.Mey. = Carpacoce
- Marquisia A.Rich. ex DC. = Coprosma
- Nobula Adans. = Phyllis
- Oxyspermum Eckl. & Zeyh. = Galopina
- Pelaphia Banks & Sol. ex A.Cunn. = Coprosma
- Peratanthe Urb. = Nertera
- Rubioides Sol. ex Gaertn. = Opercularia
