= Lagotis =

Lagotis may refer to:

- Lagotis (plant), a genus of plants in the family Plantaginaceae
- Lagotis, a genus of rodents in the family Chinchillidae, synonym of Lagidium
- Lagotis, a genus of plants in the family Rubiaceae, synonym of Carpacoce
- Macrotis lagotis, a bilby
