= Dactylispa debilis =

Scientific classification
- Kingdom: Animalia
- Phylum: Arthropoda
- Class: Insecta
- Order: Coleoptera
- Suborder: Polyphaga
- Infraorder: Cucujiformia
- Family: Chrysomelidae
- Genus: Dactylispa
- Species: D. debilis

Binomial name
- Dactylispa debilis (Gestro, 1897)

Synonyms
- Hispa debilis Gestro, 1897

Species of beetle

Dactylispa debilis is a species of beetle of the family Chrysomelidae. It is found in Indonesia (Sumatra) and Malaysia.

== Life history ==
The recorded host plants for this species are Nertera depressa and Plectronia horrida.
