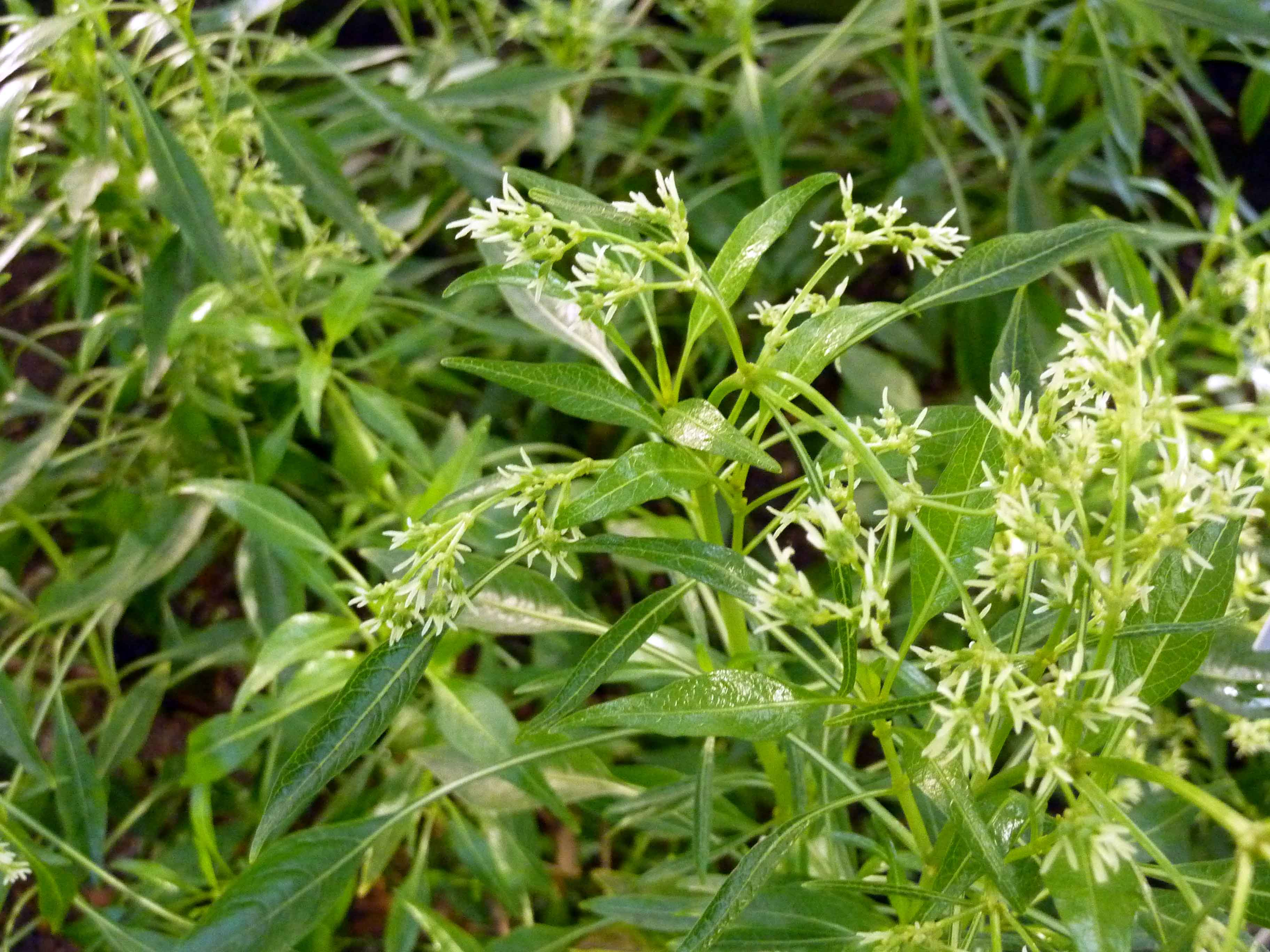

Scientific classification
- Kingdom: Plantae
- Clade: Tracheophytes
- Clade: Angiosperms
- Clade: Eudicots
- Clade: Asterids
- Order: Gentianales
- Family: Rubiaceae
- Genus: Phyllis
- Species: P. viscosa

Binomial name
- Phyllis viscosa Webb & Berthel.

= Phyllis viscosa =

Species of plant

Phyllis viscosa is a flowering plant in the family Rubiaceae. It is smaller than Phyllis nobla of the same genus, with narrow, sticky leaves and short, dense inflorescence.

== Distribution ==
Tenerife: W, region, Los Silos, Cuevas Negras, Montes de Teno, Masca etc., cliffs in the lower zone up to 1,000 metres (3,300 ft) at Cumbre de Masca.
