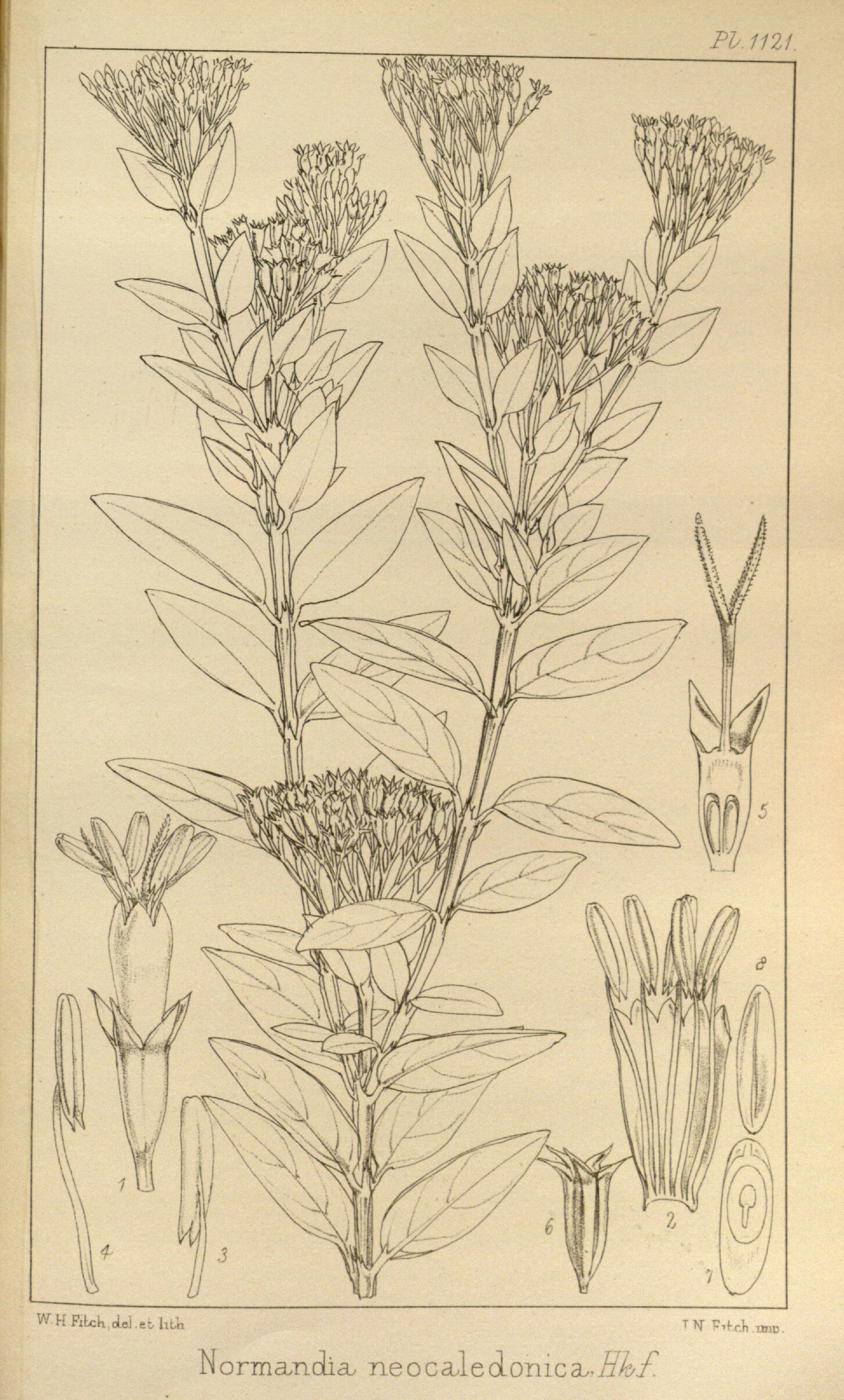

Scientific classification
- Kingdom: Plantae
- Clade: Tracheophytes
- Clade: Angiosperms
- Clade: Eudicots
- Clade: Asterids
- Order: Gentianales
- Family: Rubiaceae
- Subfamily: Rubioideae
- Tribe: Anthospermeae
- Genus: Normandia; Hook.f.
- Species: N. neocaledonica

Binomial name
- Normandia neocaledonica Hook.f.

= Normandia =

Genus of plants

Normandia is a monotypic genus of flowering plants in the family Rubiaceae. It was described by Joseph Dalton Hooker in 1872. The genus contains only one species, Normandia neocaledonica, which is endemic to New Caledonia. The genus is related to Coprosma and Nertera.
