= Nenax =

Scientific classification
- Kingdom: Plantae
- Clade: Tracheophytes
- Clade: Angiosperms
- Clade: Eudicots
- Clade: Asterids
- Order: Gentianales
- Family: Rubiaceae
- Subfamily: Rubioideae
- Tribe: Anthospermeae
- Genus: Nenax; Gaertn.

Type species
- Nenax acerosa Gaertn.

Synonyms
- Ambraria Cruse

Genus of plants

Nenax is a genus of flowering plants in the family Rubiaceae. It was described by Joseph Gaertner in 1788. The genus is found in Namibia, South Africa and Lesotho.
