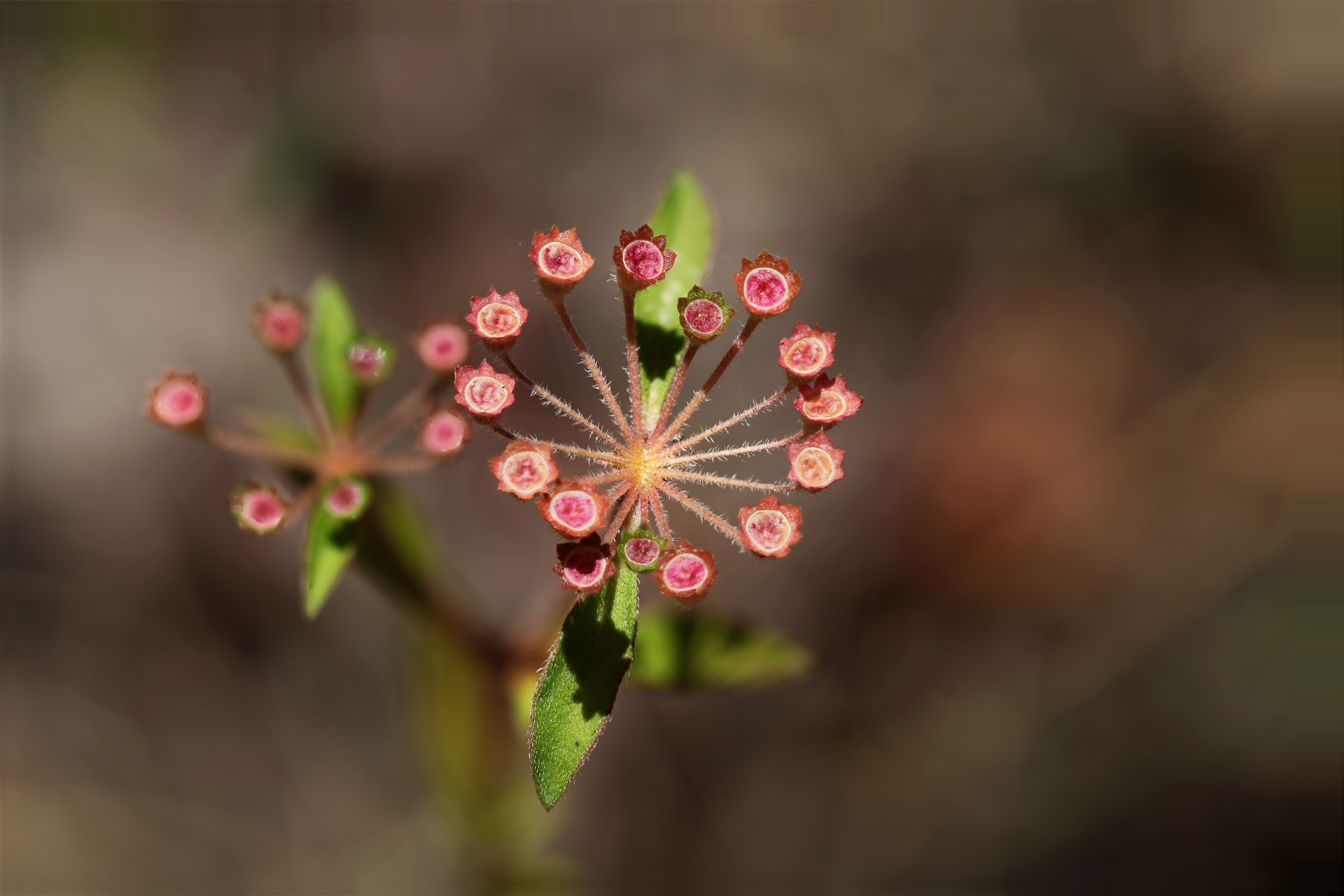

Scientific classification
- Kingdom: Plantae
- Clade: Tracheophytes
- Clade: Angiosperms
- Clade: Eudicots
- Clade: Asterids
- Order: Gentianales
- Family: Rubiaceae
- Subfamily: Rubioideae
- Tribe: Anthospermeae
- Genus: Pomax; Sol. ex DC.
- Species: P. umbellata

Binomial name
- Pomax umbellata (Gaertn.) Sol. ex A.Rich.

Synonyms
- Synonyms of Pomax umbellata: Opercularia lamarckiana Schult. & Schult.f.; Opercularia umbellata Gaertn.; Pomax glabra DC.; Pomax hirta DC.; Pomax rupestris F.Muell.; Pomax umbellata var. carnosula Domin; Pomax umbellata var. glabra (DC.) Domin; Pomax umbellata var. hirta (DC.) Domin; Pomax umbellata var. mitchelliana Domin; Pomax umbellata var. ovatifolia Domin

= Pomax =

Pomax umbellata

Genus of plants

Pomax is a genus of flowering plants in the coffee family, Rubiaceae. Pomax umbellata, found in Australia, is the sole species of the genus. The genus was created in 1830, by the Swiss taxonomist Augustin Pyramus de Candolle, and published in his Prodromus Systematis Naturalis Regni Vegetabilis. Pomax umbellata was first described as Opercularia umbellata by Joseph Gaertner in 1788. but was transferred to the genus, Pomax by Daniel Solander in 1834.
