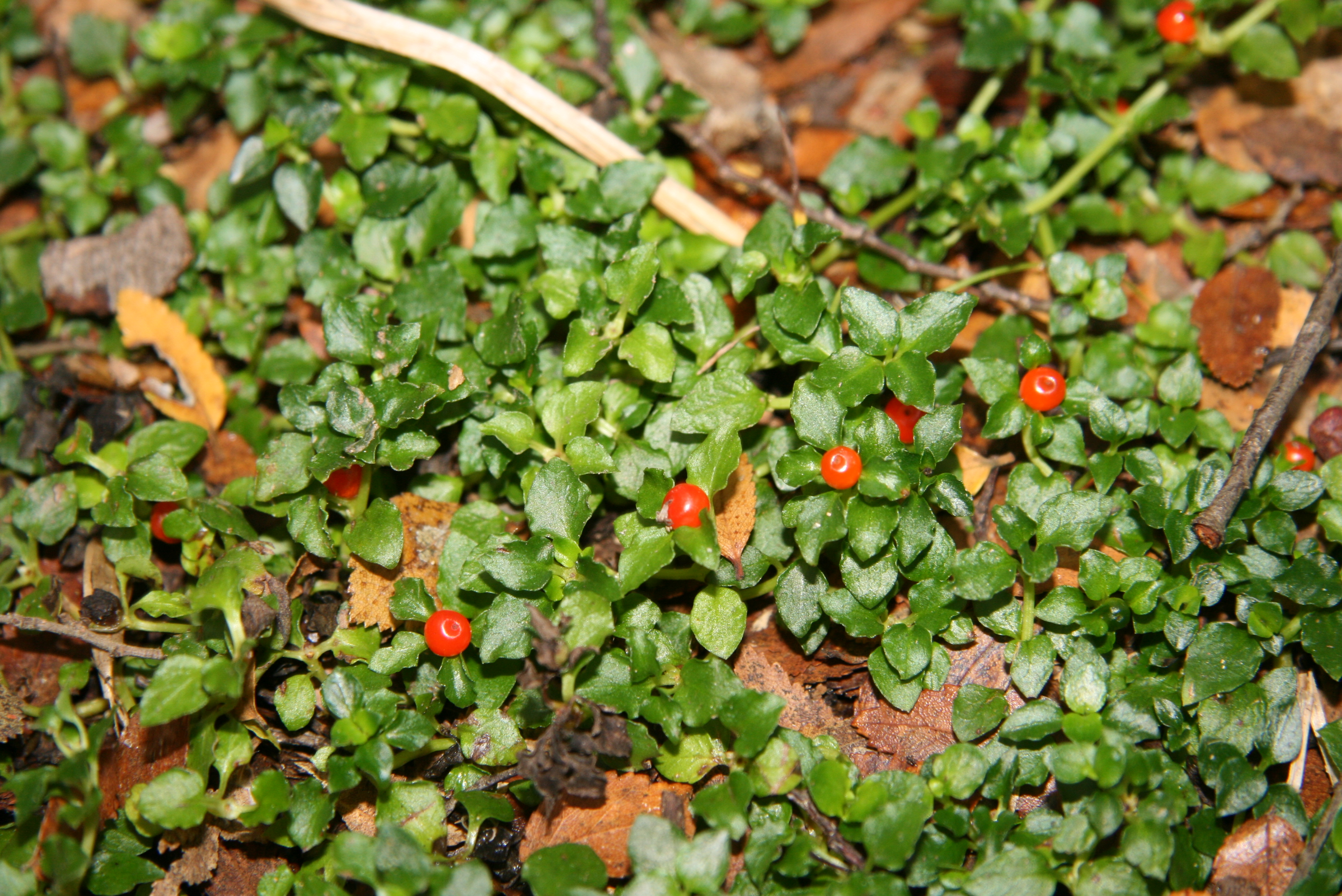
- N. granadensis

Scientific classification
- Kingdom: Plantae
- Clade: Embryophytes
- Clade: Tracheophytes
- Clade: Spermatophytes
- Clade: Angiosperms
- Clade: Eudicots
- Clade: Asterids
- Order: Gentianales
- Family: Rubiaceae
- Subfamily: Rubioideae
- Tribe: Anthospermeae
- Genus: Nertera; Banks ex Gaertn.

Species
- See text

= Nertera =

Genus of plants

Nertera is a genus of about 15 species of flowering plants in the family Rubiaceae, native to the Southern Hemisphere, in South America and Australasia, with one species extending into the Northern Hemisphere in Central America, eastern Asia, and Hawaii. The name derives from the Greek word nerteros, meaning low down. Common names include pincushion, coral bead or bead plant. They are prostrate, creeping, mat-forming herbaceous perennial plants growing to 20–40 cm (7.9–15.7 in) across or more but no more than a few centimetres high. The leaves are usually quite small, and when crushed may in some species release a foul smell (methanethiol) like the related woody genus Coprosma. The flowers are insignificant and probably wind-pollinated. The fruit is usually a bright orange berry, but in some species may be a dry capsule.

Selected species

- Nertera balfouriana - from New Zealand, forming small but dense patches of vegetation on wet boggy ground at altitudes between about 600 to 1000 m. It fruits in February, small bright red berries which can cover the whole plant.
- Nertera ciliata
- Nertera cunninghamii - a common plant at low altitudes in New Zealand, on streamsides or wet roadsides. When in fruit, the plant is covered by bright orange berries produced singly.
- Nertera granadensis
