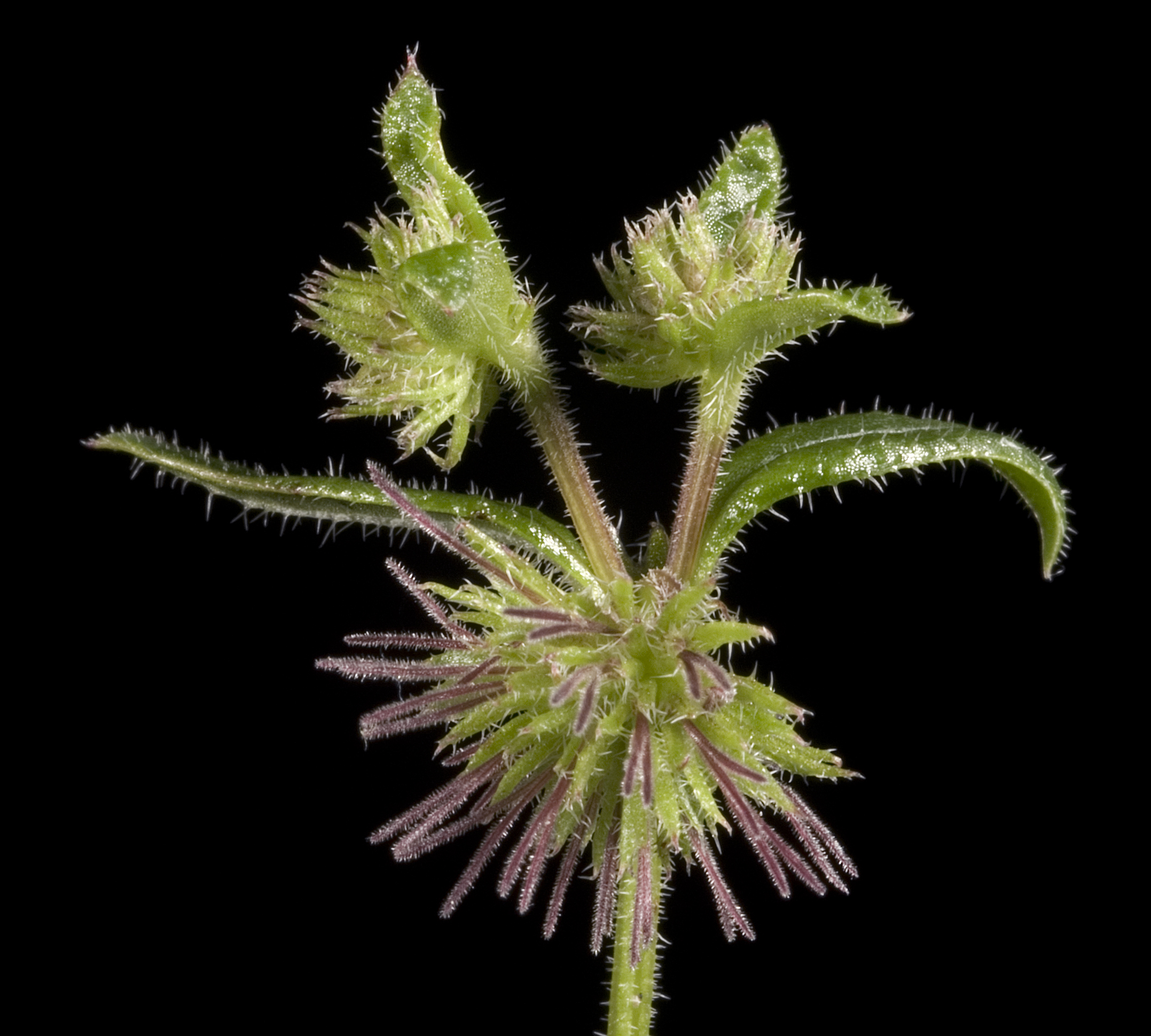
- Opercularia echinocephala

Scientific classification
- Kingdom: Plantae
- Clade: Tracheophytes
- Clade: Angiosperms
- Clade: Eudicots
- Clade: Asterids
- Order: Gentianales
- Family: Rubiaceae
- Genus: Opercularia
- Species: O. echinocephala

Binomial name
- Opercularia echinocephala Benth.
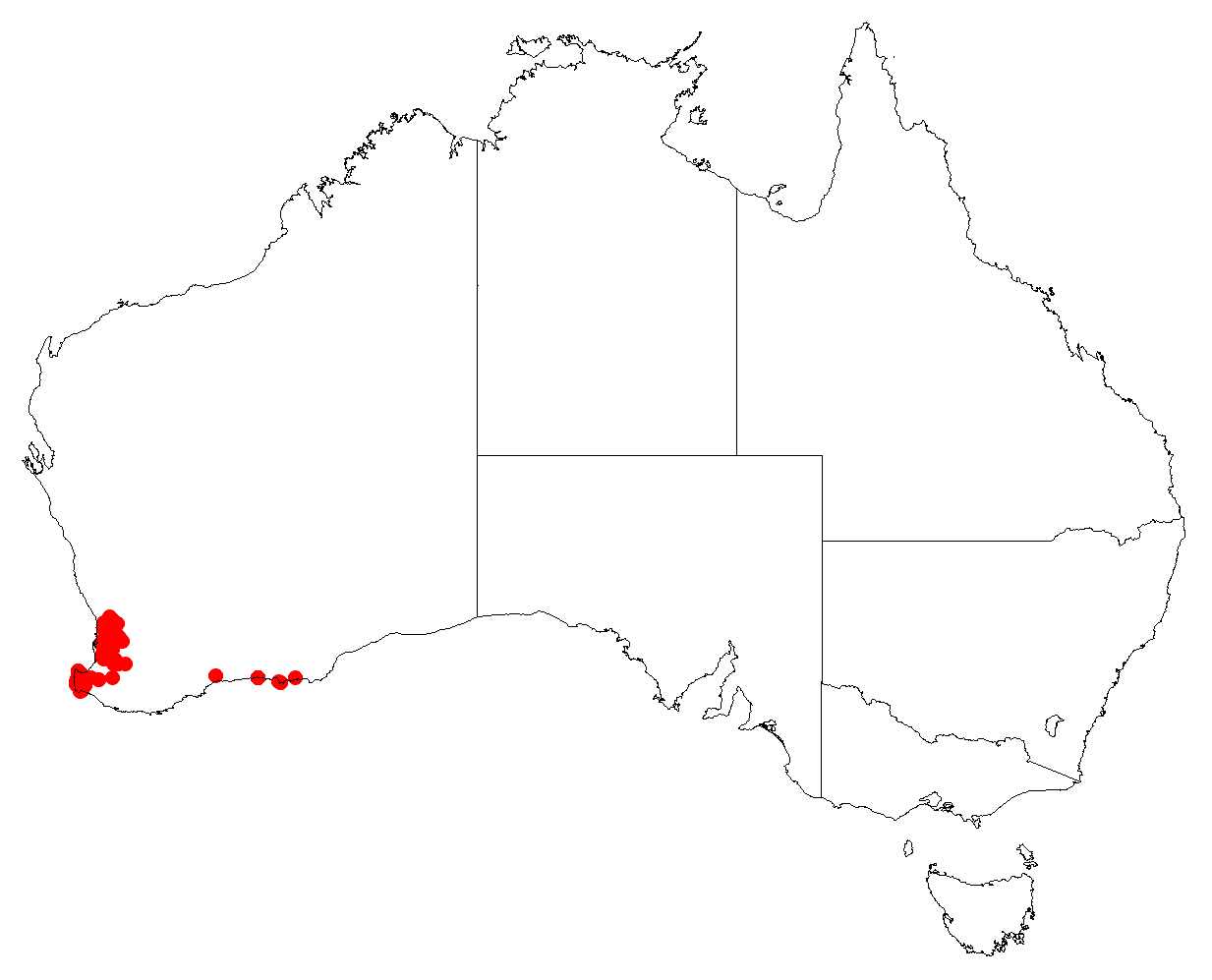
- Collection data for O. echinocephala from Australasian Virtual Herbarium

= Opercularia echinocephala =

Species of flowering plant

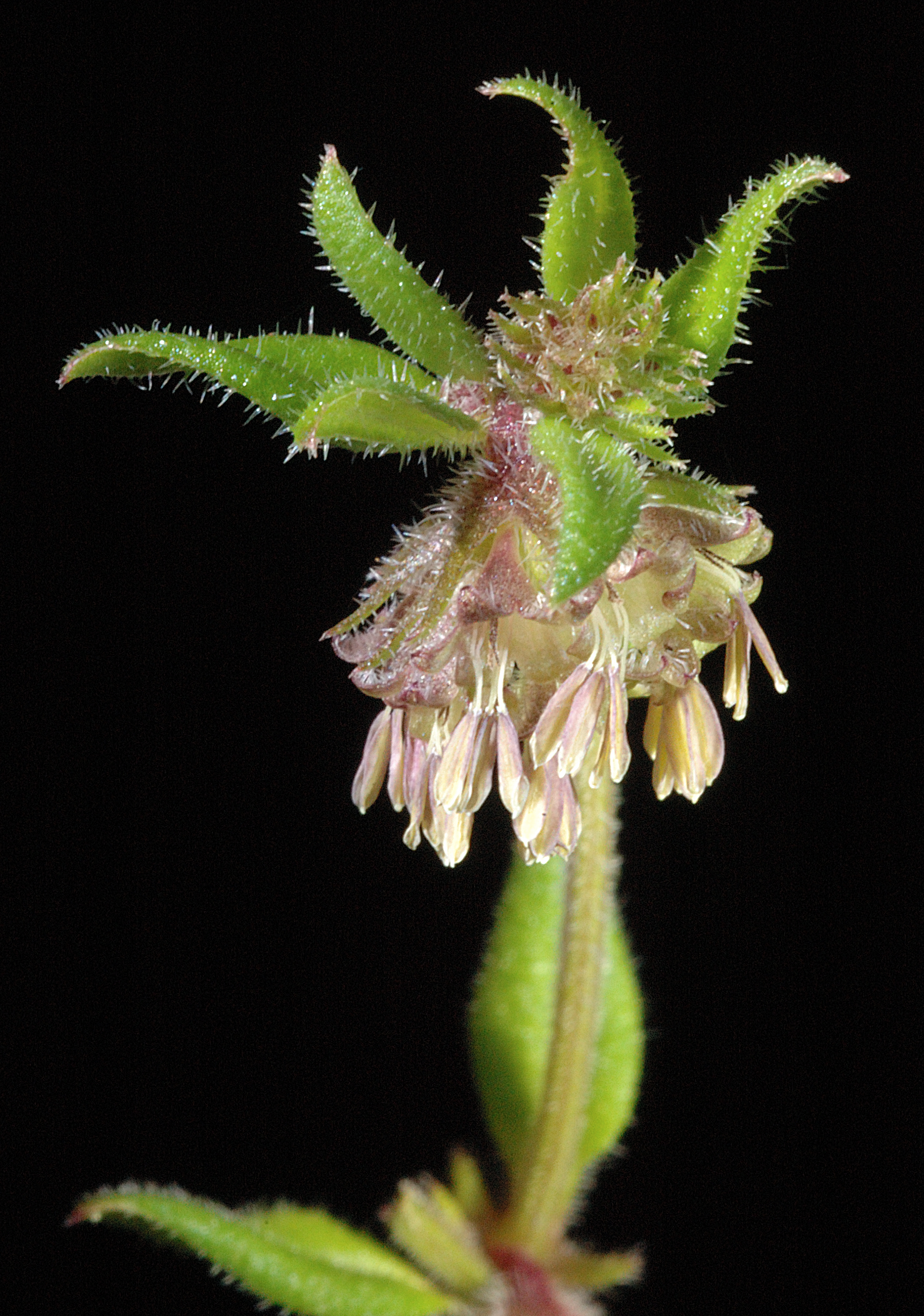
O. echinocephala: ripening fruit

Opercularia echinocephala (bristly headed stinkweed) is a species of plant within the genus Opercularia, in the family Rubiaceae. It is endemic to the southwest of Western Australia.

== Description ==
O. echinocephala is a spreading perennial from 0.1 to 1.3 m high which grows on flat plains and river banks on sands and lateritic soils. Its green/ pink flowers are seen from August to November.

It is found in the IBRA regions of Esperance Plains, Jarrah Forest, Swan Coastal Plain and Warren.

== Taxonomy ==
It was first described by Bentham in 1867 as Opercularia echinocephala. No synonyms are listed by APNI, nor by Plants of the World online.
