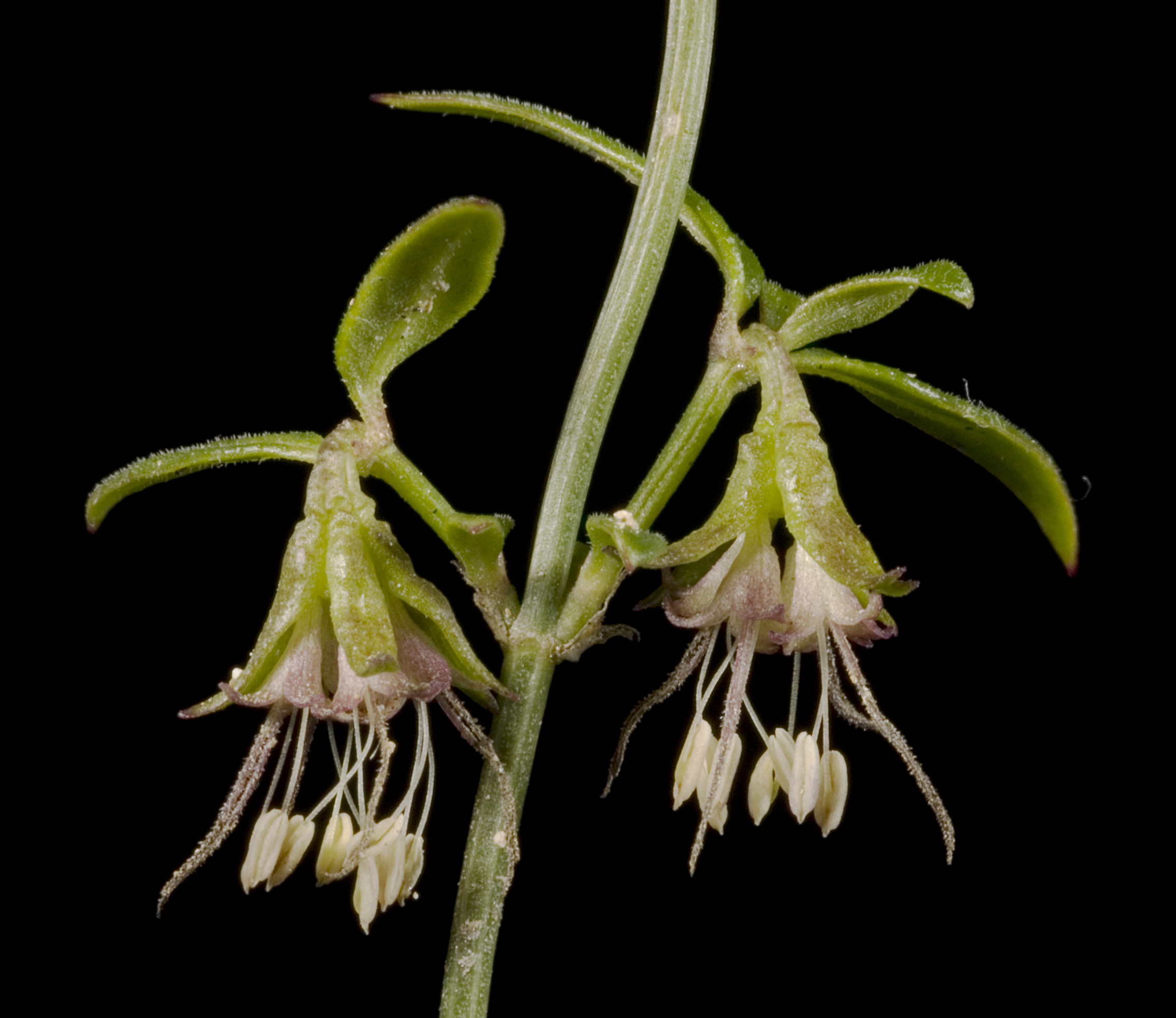

Scientific classification
- Kingdom: Plantae
- Clade: Tracheophytes
- Clade: Angiosperms
- Clade: Eudicots
- Clade: Asterids
- Order: Gentianales
- Family: Rubiaceae
- Genus: Opercularia
- Species: O. apiciflora

Binomial name
- Opercularia apiciflora Labill. ex Juss.

= Opercularia apiciflora =

Species of Rubiaceae

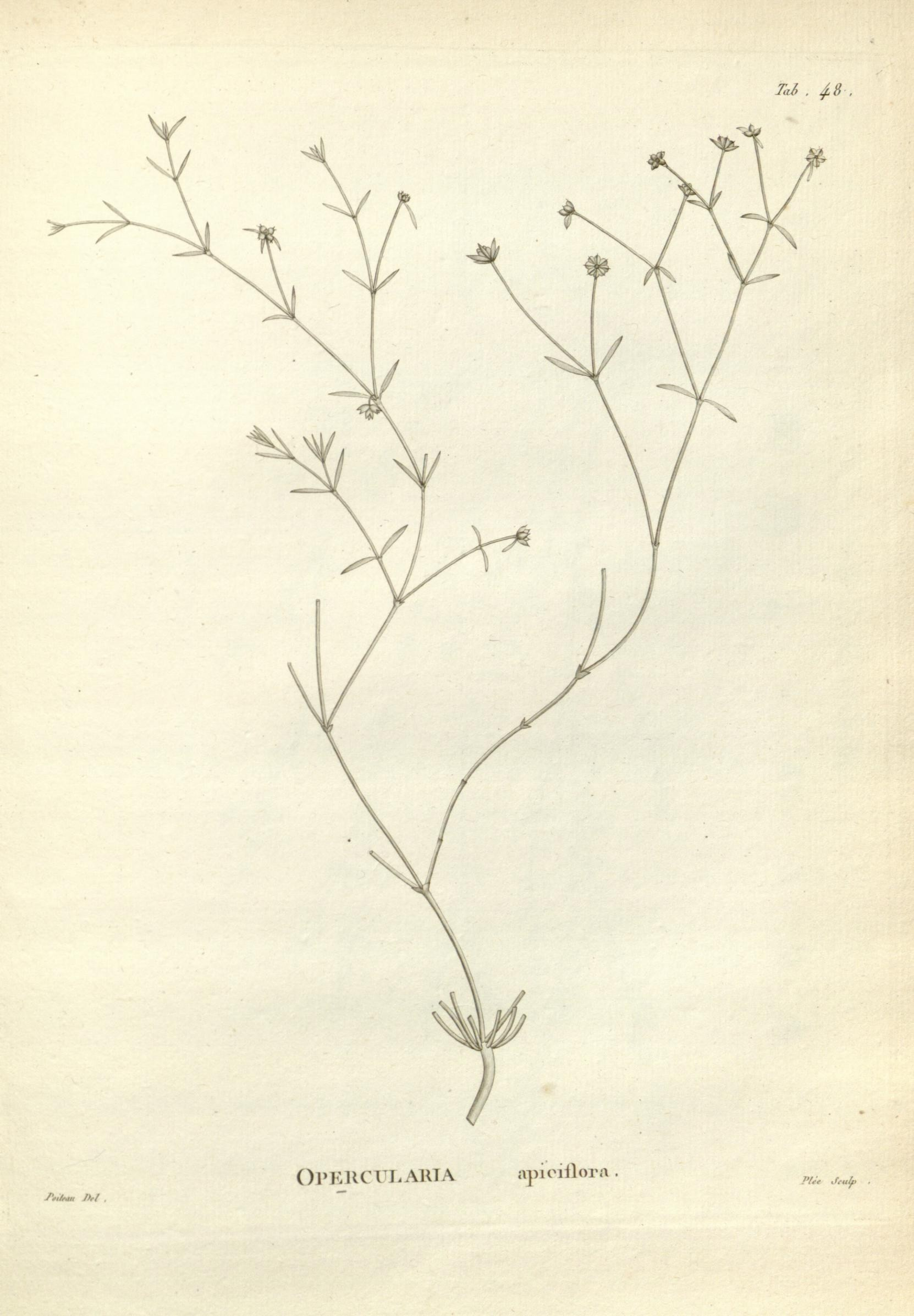
Tab 48 (Labillardiere, 1804)

Opercularia apiciflora is a plant in the Rubiaceae family. It was first described in 1804 by Jacques Labillardière. There are no synonyms.

It is found in south-west Western Australia.
