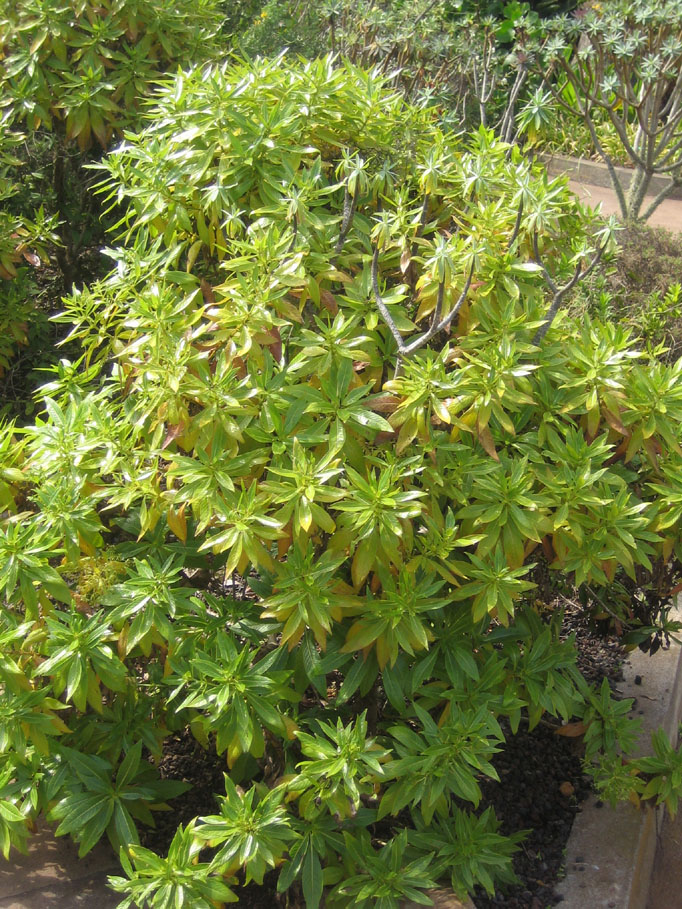

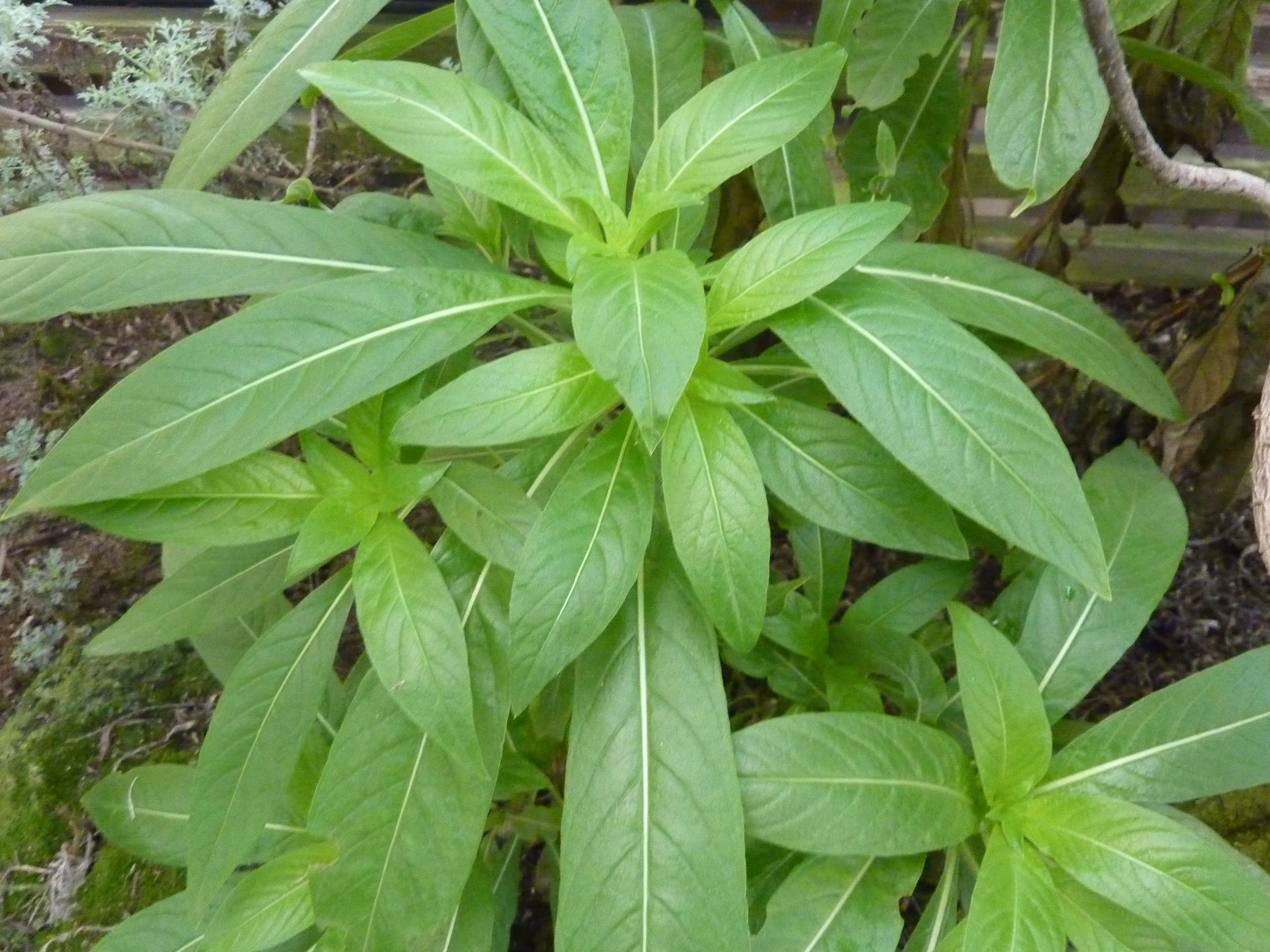

Scientific classification
- Kingdom: Plantae
- Clade: Tracheophytes
- Clade: Angiosperms
- Clade: Eudicots
- Clade: Asterids
- Order: Gentianales
- Family: Rubiaceae
- Subfamily: Rubioideae
- Tribe: Anthospermeae
- Genus: Phyllis; L.

Synonyms
- Nobula Adans.; Bupleuroides Moench

= Phyllis (plant) =

Genus of plants

Phyllis is a genus of plants in the Rubiaceae. There are two known species, both native to islands in the eastern North Atlantic Ocean.

== Description ==
Glabrous evergreen sub-shrubs. Stems rounded, smooth. Leaves in whorls of 3, with small linear stipules in between, or with petiole indistinct. Inflorescence of axillary and terminal compound panicle-like dichasia, each many-flowered and bracteates. Calyx absent. Corolla (4-)5 lobed, the lobes spreading to strongly recurved, white to green. Fruit dry, of 2 mericarps, glabrous except on inner faces.

== Species ==
- Phyllis nobla L. - Madeira, Canary Islands
- Phyllis viscosa Webb ex Christ - Canary Islands
