= Opercularia ovata =

Scientific classification
- Kingdom: Plantae
- Clade: Tracheophytes
- Clade: Angiosperms
- Clade: Eudicots
- Clade: Asterids
- Order: Gentianales
- Family: Rubiaceae
- Genus: Opercularia
- Species: O. ovata

Binomial name
- Opercularia ovata Hook.f.

Species of plant

Opercularia ovata is a species of plant in the family Rubiaceae.
