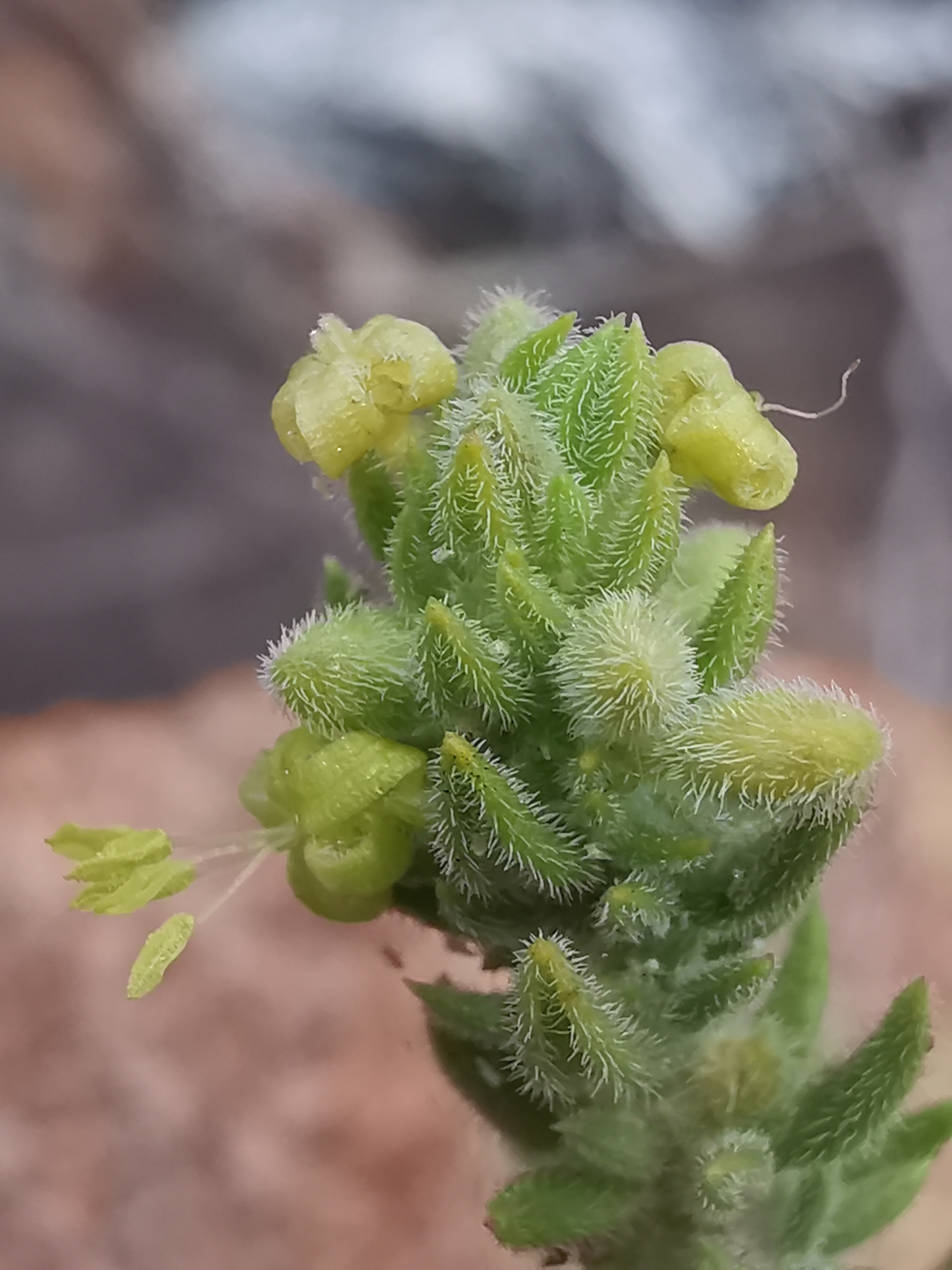
- Anthospermum hispidulum

Scientific classification
- Kingdom: Plantae
- Clade: Tracheophytes
- Clade: Angiosperms
- Clade: Eudicots
- Clade: Asterids
- Order: Gentianales
- Family: Rubiaceae
- Subfamily: Rubioideae
- Tribe: Anthospermeae
- Genus: Anthospermum; L. (1753)

Type species
- Anthospermum aethiopicum L.

Species
- 39; see text

Synonyms
- Ambraria Heist. ex Fabr. (1763)

= Anthospermum =

Genus of plants

Anthospermum is a genus of flowering plants in the family Rubiaceae. It is found in tropical and southern Africa, Madagascar, and the southwestern Arabian Peninsula.

== Species ==
39 species are accepted.

- Anthospermum aethiopicum L.
- Anthospermum ammannioides S.Moore
- Anthospermum asperuloides Hook.f.
- Anthospermum basuticum Puff
- Anthospermum bergianum Cruse
- Anthospermum bicorne Puff
- Anthospermum comptonii Puff
- Anthospermum dregei Sond.
- Anthospermum emirnense Baker
- Anthospermum ericifolium (Licht. ex Roem. & Schult.) Kuntze
- Anthospermum esterhuysenianum Puff
- Anthospermum galioides Rchb. ex Spreng.
- Anthospermum galpinii Schltr.
- Anthospermum herbaceum L.f.
- Anthospermum hirtum Cruse
- Anthospermum hispidulum E.Mey. ex Sond.
- Anthospermum ibityense Puff
- Anthospermum isaloense Homolle ex Puff
- Anthospermum littoreum L.Bolus
- Anthospermum longisepalum Homolle ex Puff
- Anthospermum madagascariensis Homolle ex Puff
- Anthospermum monticola Puff
- Anthospermum pachyrrhizum Hiern
- Anthospermum palustre Homolle ex Puff
- Anthospermum paniculatum Cruse
- Anthospermum perrieri Homolle ex Puff
- Anthospermum prostratum Sond.
- Anthospermum rigidum Eckl. & Zeyh.
- Anthospermum rosmarinus K.Schum.
- Anthospermum spathulatum Spreng.
- Anthospermum streyi Puff
- Anthospermum ternatum Hiern
- Anthospermum thymoides Baker
- Anthospermum usambarense K.Schum.
- Anthospermum vallicola S.Moore
- Anthospermum villosicarpum (Verdc.) Puff
- Anthospermum welwitschii Hiern
- Anthospermum whyteanum Hiern
- Anthospermum zimbabwense Puff
