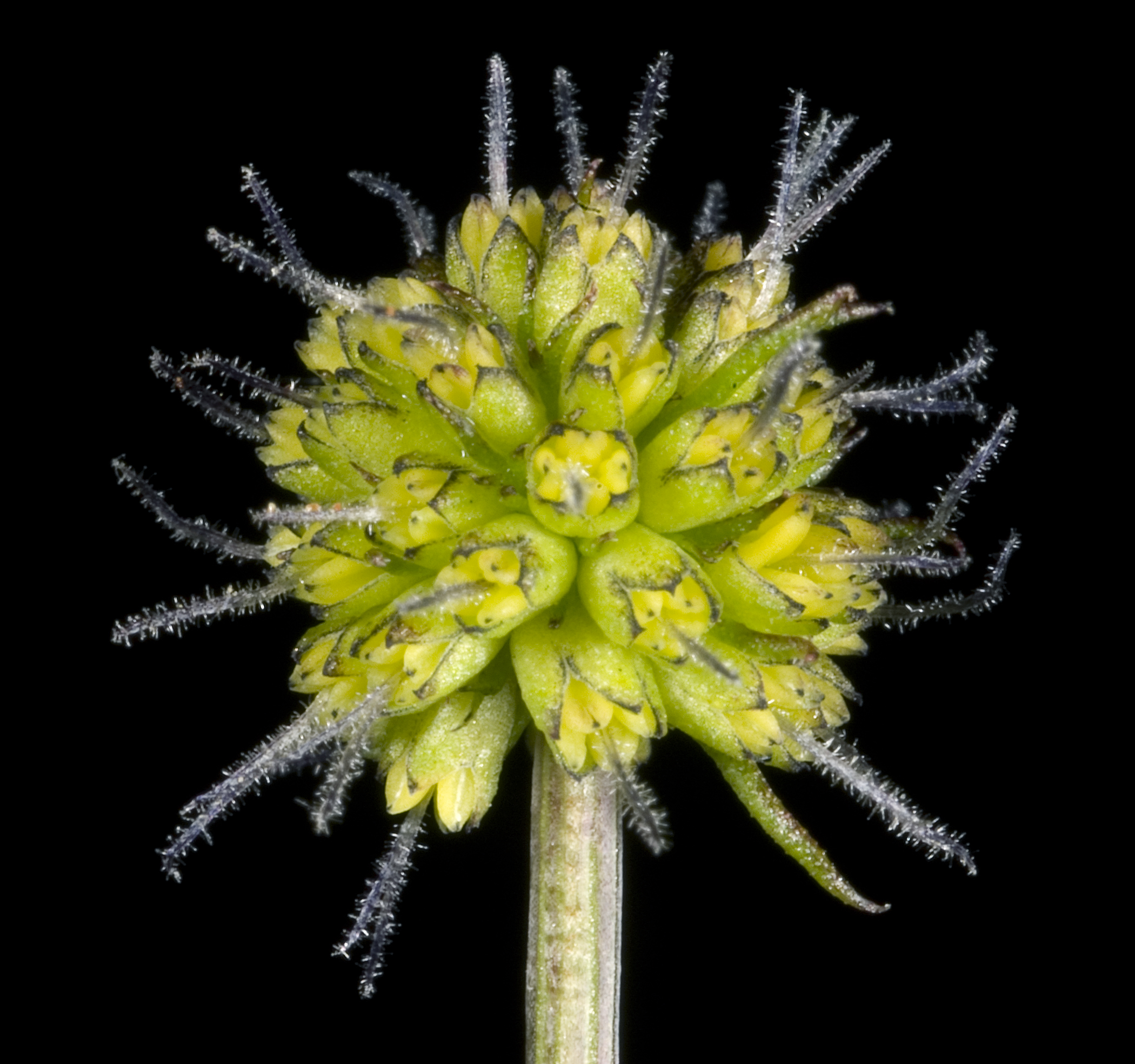

Scientific classification
- Kingdom: Plantae
- Clade: Tracheophytes
- Clade: Angiosperms
- Clade: Eudicots
- Clade: Asterids
- Order: Gentianales
- Family: Rubiaceae
- Genus: Opercularia
- Species: O. vaginata

Binomial name
- Opercularia vaginata Labill. ex Juss.
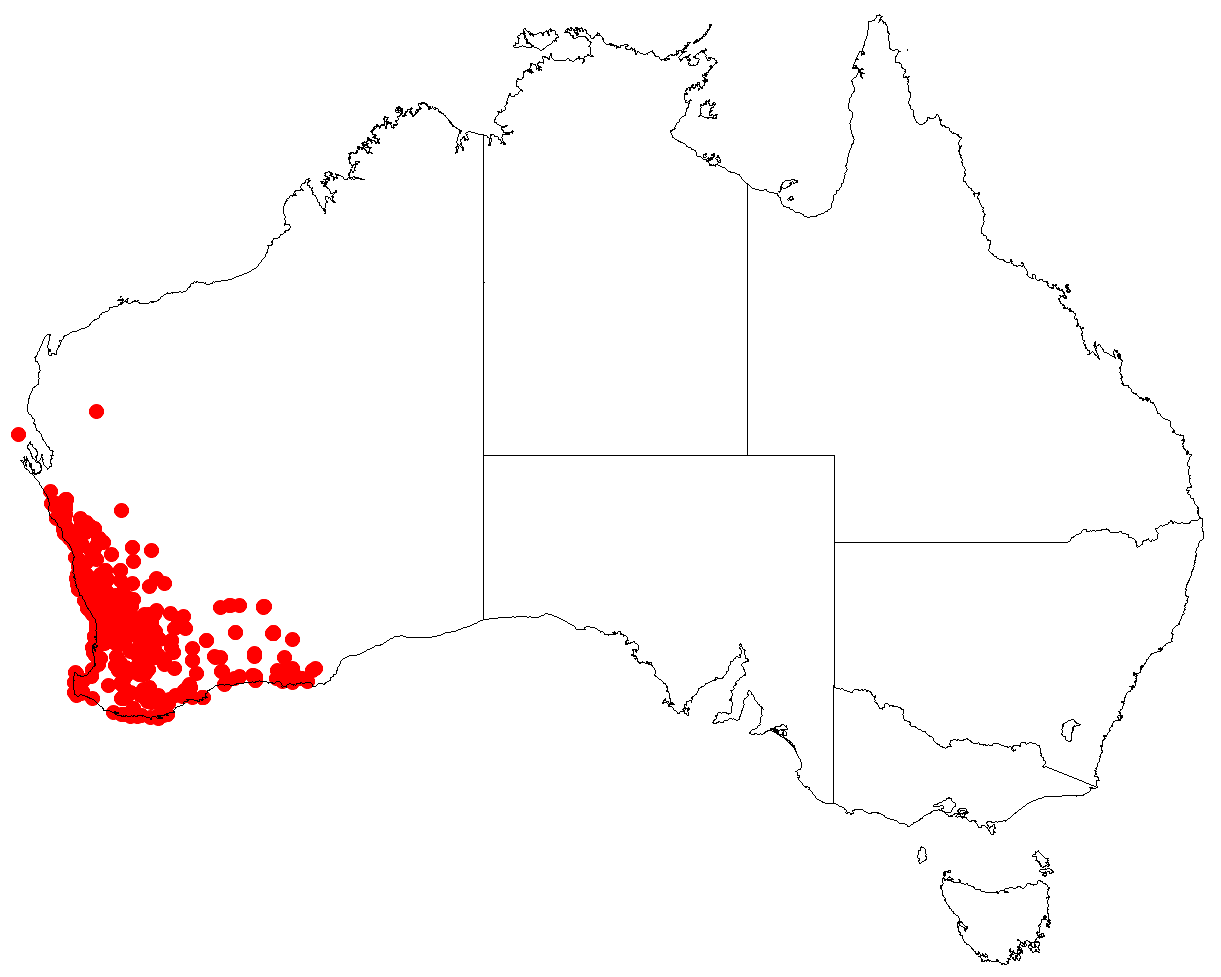
- Collections data from AVH

Synonyms
- Opercularia multicaulis Bartl.

= Opercularia vaginata =

Species of flowering plant

Opercularia vaginata (dogweed) is a species of plant within the genus Opercularia, in the family Rubiaceae. It is endemic to the southwest of Western Australia.

== Description ==
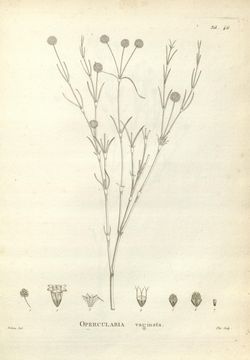
Illustration from the early 1800s

O. vaginata is a spreading or erect perennial which grows to a height of 0.45 m on sandy, granitic and lateritic soils, and coastal limestone. Its green or green-yellow flowers are seen from July to December.

== Distribution ==
It is found in Beard's provinces of Eremaean Province and the South-West Province, or the later classification of IBRA regions of Avon Wheatbelt, Coolgardie (biogeographic region), Esperance Plains, Gascoyne, Geraldton Sandplains, Jarrah Forest, Mallee (biogeographic region), Murchison (biogeographic region), Swan Coastal Plain, Warren and Yalgoo (biogeographic region).

== Taxonomy ==
It was first described by Jacques Labillardiere in 1804 as Opercularia vaginata in de Jussieu's Annales du Muséum d'histoire naturelle.
