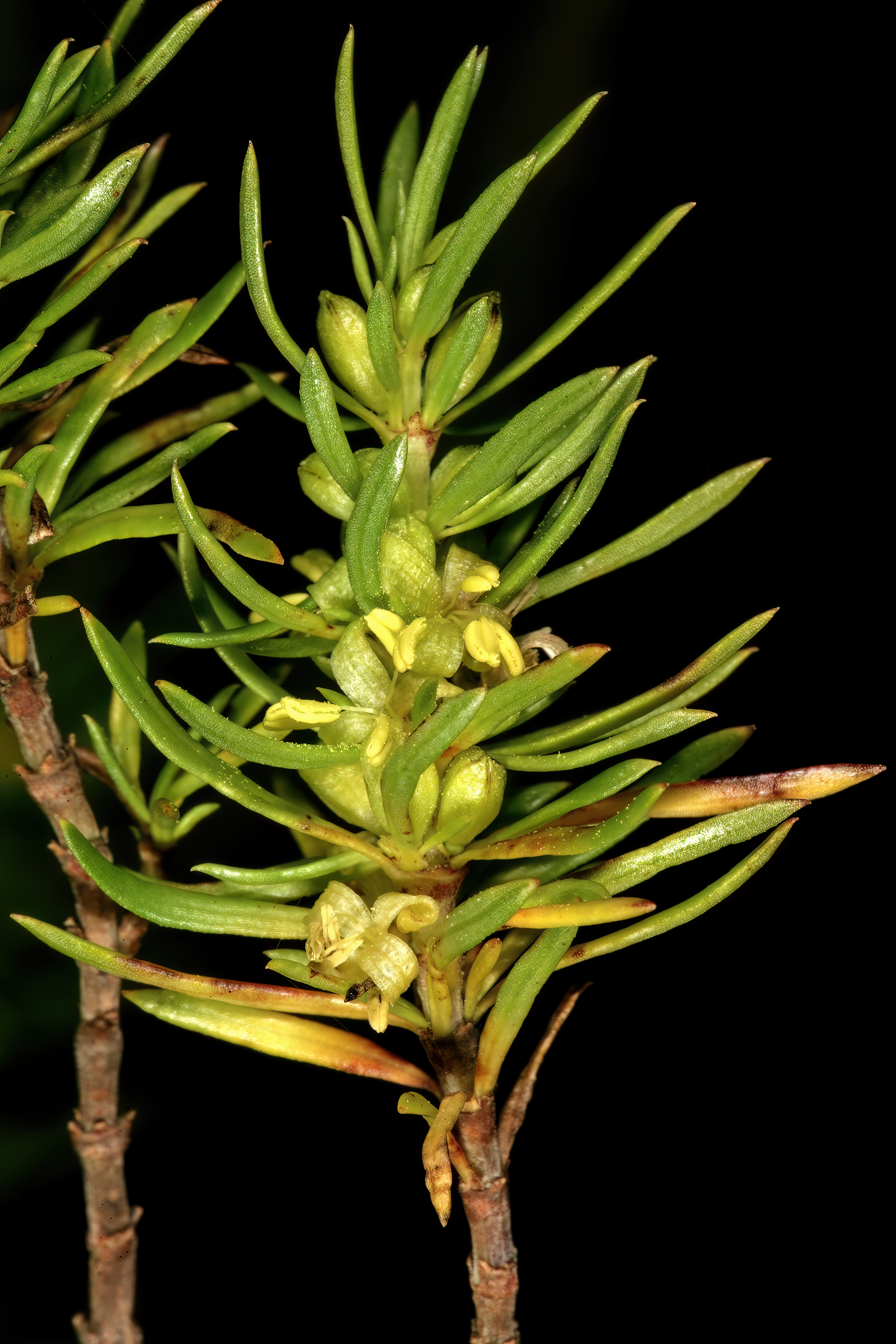
- In Hottentots Holland Nature Reserve, South Africa

Scientific classification
- Kingdom: Plantae
- Clade: Embryophytes
- Clade: Tracheophytes
- Clade: Spermatophytes
- Clade: Angiosperms
- Clade: Eudicots
- Clade: Asterids
- Order: Gentianales
- Family: Rubiaceae
- Genus: Anthospermum
- Species: A. aethiopicum

Binomial name
- Anthospermum aethiopicum L.

= Anthospermum aethiopicum =

Species of plant

Anthospermum aethiopicum is a species of flowering plant in the family Rubiaceae, indigenous to South Africa.

== Description ==
A shrub reaching 2 meters in height, with bunches of yellow flowers.

Its small, thin leaves are always in sets of three, a character that differentiates it from closely allied species.

== Distribution ==
This species occurs across the southern Cape, from Calvinia in the north west, across the Overberg region and into the Eastern Cape Province. It favours slightly less arid areas, and is common on shale or clay soils.
