= Galopina =

Scientific classification
- Kingdom: Plantae
- Clade: Tracheophytes
- Clade: Angiosperms
- Clade: Eudicots
- Clade: Asterids
- Order: Gentianales
- Family: Rubiaceae
- Subfamily: Rubioideae
- Tribe: Anthospermeae
- Genus: Galopina; Thunb.

Synonyms
- Oxyspermum Eckl. & Zeyh.

Genus of plants

Galopina is a genus of flowering plants in the family Rubiaceae. The genus is found in Malawi, Mozambique, Zimbabwe, South Africa, Lesotho, and Eswatini.

== Species ==
- Galopina aspera (Eckl. & Zeyh.) Walp.
- Galopina circaeoides Thunb.
- Galopina crocyllioides Bär
- Galopina tomentosa Hochst.
