= Anthospermum asperuloides =

Conservation status
- Near Threatened (IUCN 2.3)

Scientific classification
- Kingdom: Plantae
- Clade: Tracheophytes
- Clade: Angiosperms
- Clade: Eudicots
- Clade: Asterids
- Order: Gentianales
- Family: Rubiaceae
- Genus: Anthospermum
- Species: A. asperuloides

Binomial name
- Anthospermum asperuloides Hook.f.

Species of plant

Anthospermum asperuloides is a species of flowering plant in the family Rubiaceae. It is found in eastern Cameroon and on the island of Bioko, which is part of Equatorial Guinea. Its natural habitat is subtropical or tropical dry lowland grassland.
