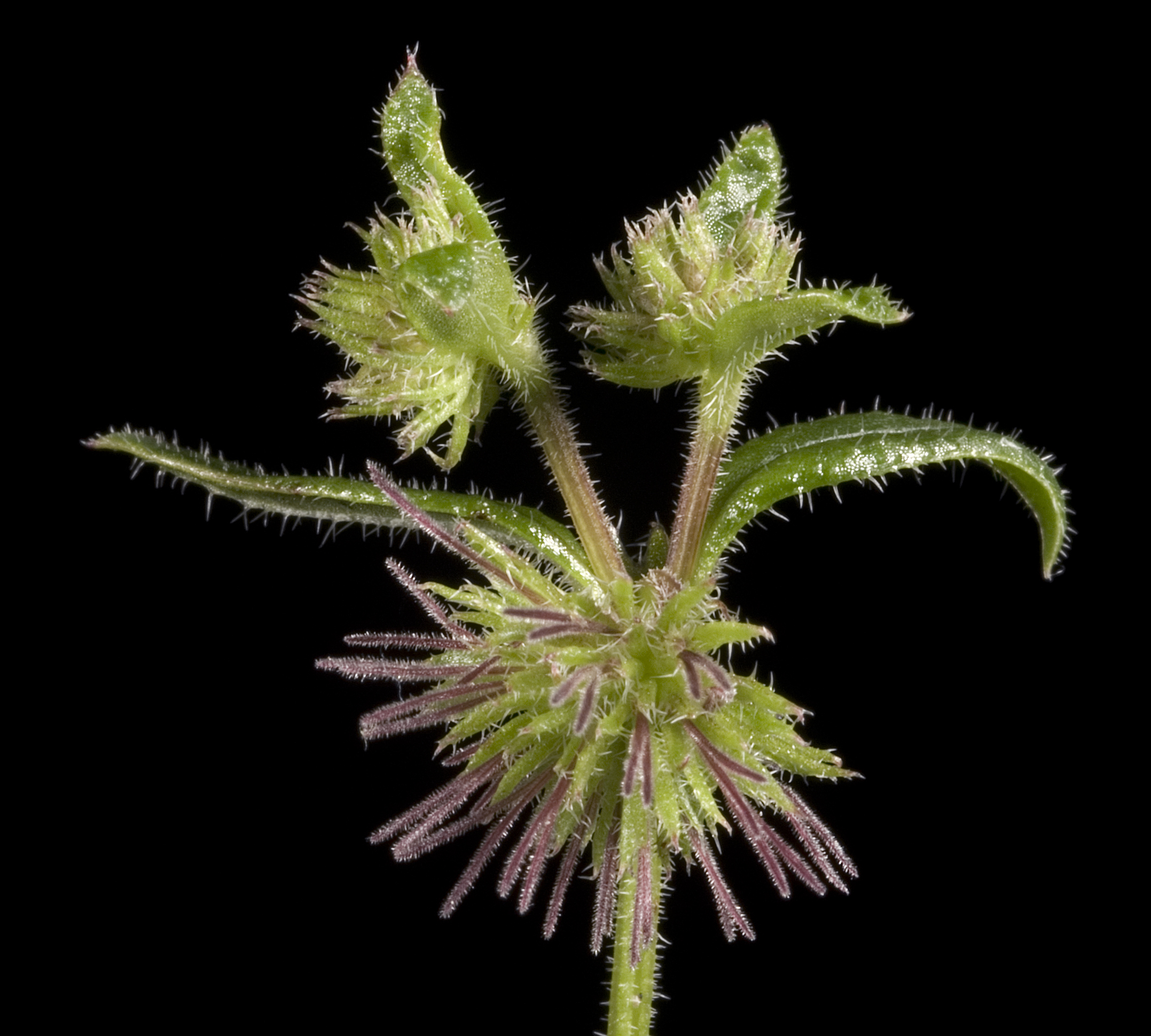
- Opercularia echinocephala

Scientific classification
- Kingdom: Plantae
- Clade: Tracheophytes
- Clade: Angiosperms
- Clade: Eudicots
- Clade: Asterids
- Order: Gentianales
- Family: Rubiaceae
- Genus: Opercularia; Gaertn.

= Opercularia (plant) =

Genus of plants

Opercularia is a genus of perennial and subshrub flowering plants in the family Rubiaceae. There are about 15 species, all of which are endemic to Australia. Many of the species have an unpleasant odour.

Species include:

- Opercularia acolytantha Diels
- Opercularia apiciflora Juss.
- Opercularia aspera Gaertn. – coarse stinkweed
- Opercularia diphylla Gaertn.
- Opercularia echinocephala Benth. – bristly-headed stinkweed
- Opercularia hirsuta Benth. – silky-haired stinkweed
- Opercularia hispidula Endl. – hairy stinkweed, hispid stinkweed
- Opercularia liberiflora F.Muell.
- Opercularia ovata Hook.f.
- Opercularia rubioides Juss.
- Opercularia scabrida Schltdl.
- Opercularia spermacocea Juss.
- Opercularia vaginata Juss. – dog weed
- Opercularia varia Hook.f. – variable stinkweed
- Opercularia volubilis Benth. – twining stinkweed
