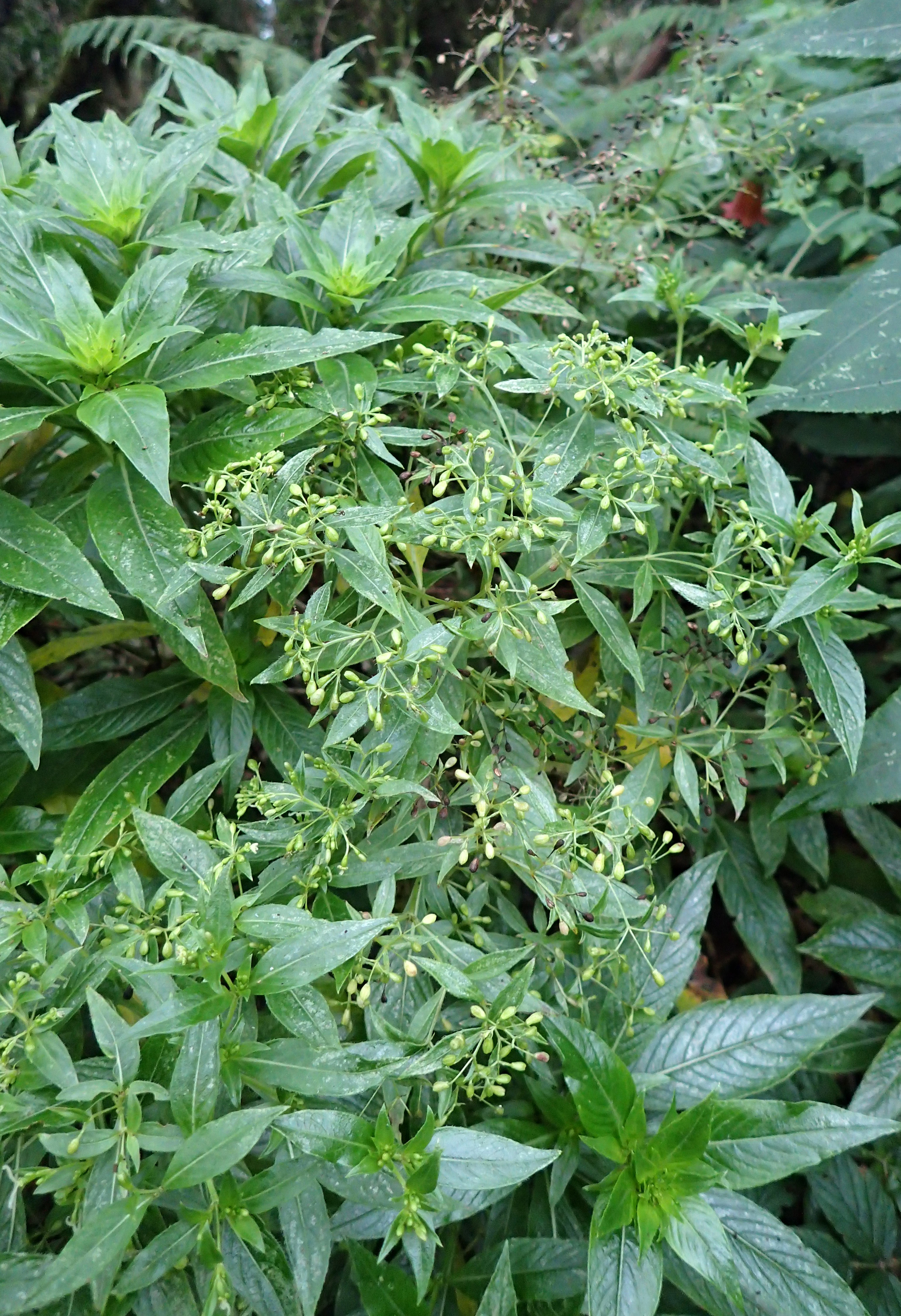

Scientific classification
- Kingdom: Plantae
- Clade: Tracheophytes
- Clade: Angiosperms
- Clade: Eudicots
- Clade: Asterids
- Order: Gentianales
- Family: Rubiaceae
- Genus: Phyllis
- Species: P. nobla

Binomial name
- Phyllis nobla L.

= Phyllis nobla =

Species of plant

Phyllis nobla is a small, glabrous or pubescent subshrub in the family Rubiaceae.

== Description ==
Leaves are entire, lanceolate to ovate, acute. Flowers are whitish, small in lax terminal and axillary panicles. Fruiting pedicels are pendulous.

== Distribution ==
=== Madeira ===
Cliffs, rocky banks and levada walls from sea level to 1800 m; widespread in Madeira but rarer in Porto Santo where it occurs on the northern coast near Fonte d'Areia and on Pico do Facho and Ilheu de Baiyo; also on Deserta Grande Island and the eastern side of Bugio.

=== Canary Islands ===
Tenerife: Laurel forest cliffs and banks, Sierra Anaga, Las Mercedes to Vueltas de Taganana, Aguamansa etc. locally very common, 600–1200 m; La Palma: Cumbre Nueva, El Paso, Barlovento etc.; La Gomera: Monte del Cedro, Arure, Chorros de Epina; El Hierro: Forest regions of El Golfo and Valverde (Ventejís); Gran Canaria: Pinar de Tamadaba, pine forest cliffs, 1000 m, Presa de los Pérez, rare.

== Gallery ==
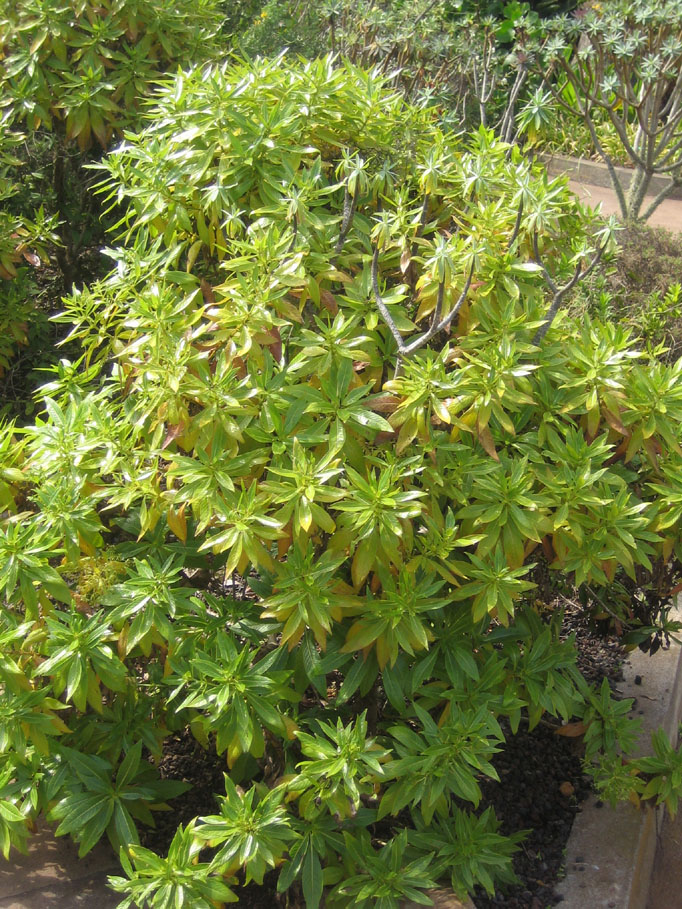
Fully grown shrublet

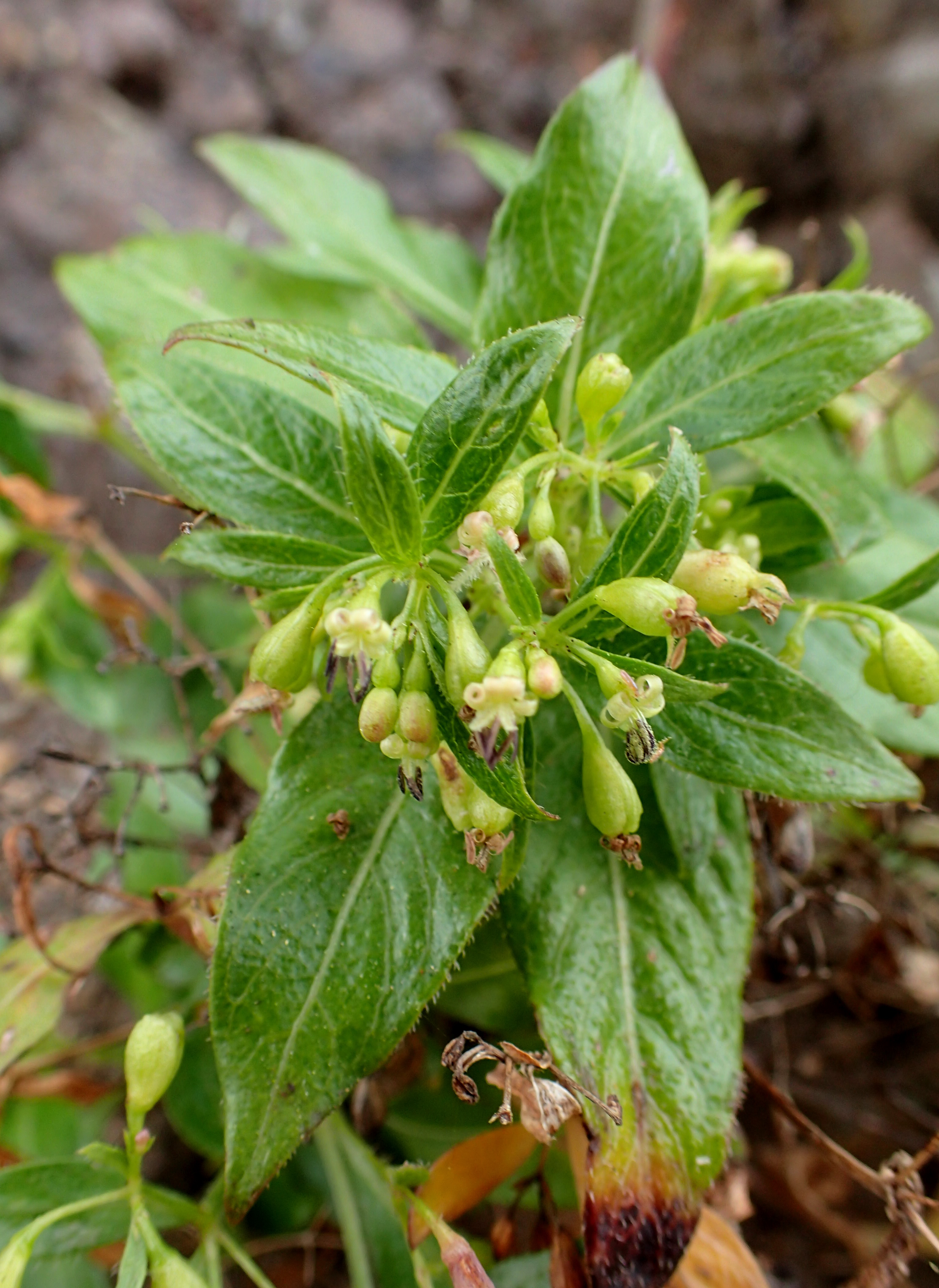
Branch with flowers and fruits

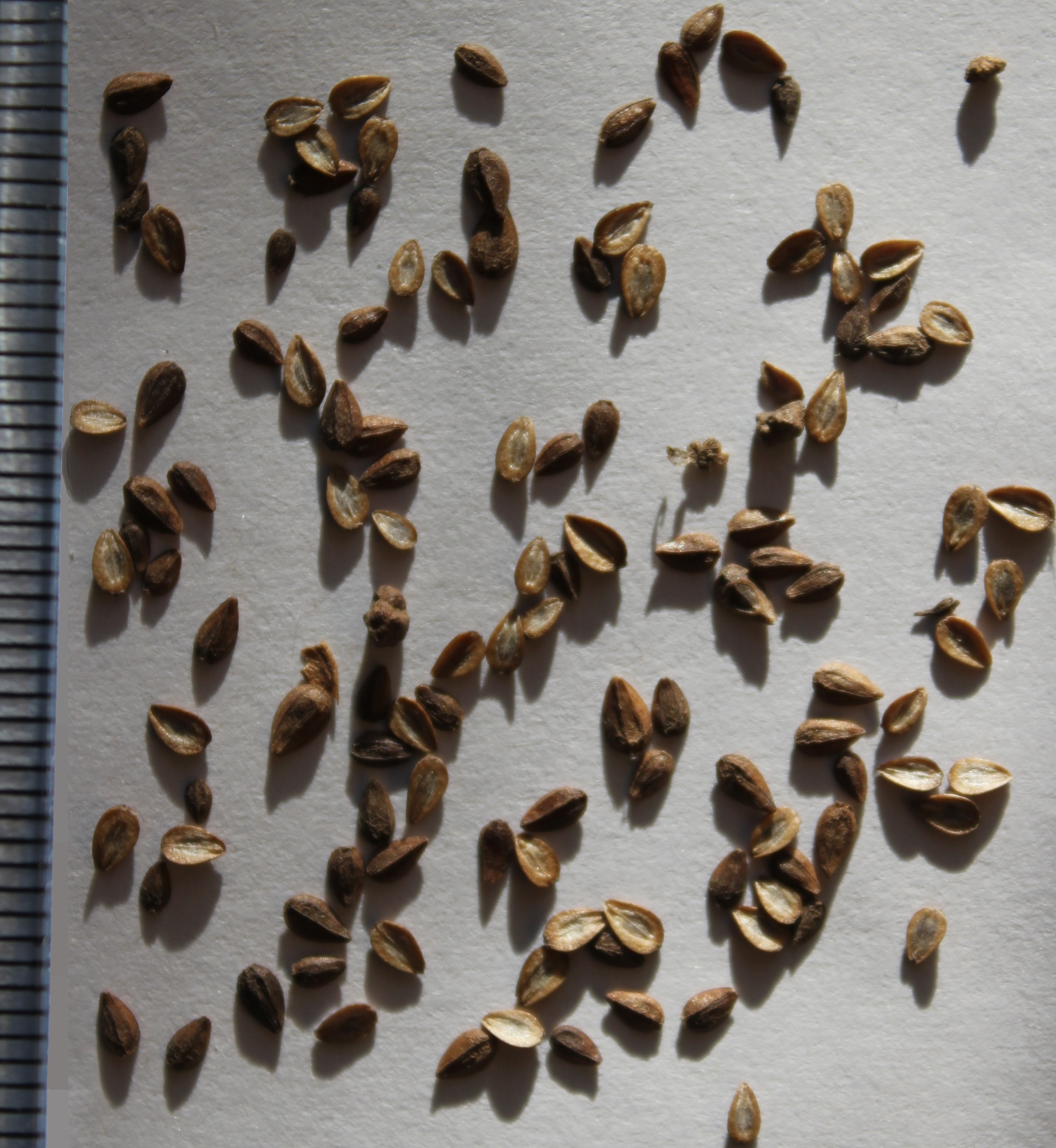
Seeds
