= Carpacoce =

Scientific classification
- Kingdom: Plantae
- Clade: Tracheophytes
- Clade: Angiosperms
- Clade: Eudicots
- Clade: Asterids
- Order: Gentianales
- Family: Rubiaceae
- Subfamily: Rubioideae
- Tribe: Anthospermeae
- Genus: Carpacoce; Sond.

Synonyms
- Lagotis E.Mey.

Genus of plants

Carpacoce is a genus of flowering plants in the family Rubiaceae. All species are endemic to the Cape Floristic Region of South Africa.

== Species ==
- Carpacoce burchellii Puff
- Carpacoce curvifolia Puff
- Carpacoce gigantea Puff (apparently extinct)
- Carpacoce heteromorpha (H.Buek) Bolus
- Carpacoce scabra (Thunb.) Sond.
  - Carpacoce scabra subsp. rupestris Puff
  - Carpacoce scabra subsp. scabra
- Carpacoce spermacocea (Rchb. ex Spreng.) Sond.
  - Carpacoce spermacocea subsp. orientalis Puff
  - Carpacoce spermacocea subsp. spermacocea
- Carpacoce vaginellata Salter
