= Leptostigma =

Scientific classification
- Kingdom: Plantae
- Clade: Tracheophytes
- Clade: Angiosperms
- Clade: Eudicots
- Clade: Asterids
- Order: Gentianales
- Family: Rubiaceae
- Genus: Leptostigma; Arn.

Genus of plants

Leptostigma is a genus of flowering plants belonging to the family Rubiaceae.

Its native range is Southeastern Australia, New Zealand, Andes.

Species:

- Leptostigma arnottianum Walp.
- Leptostigma breviflorum I.Thomps.
- Leptostigma longiflorum (Standl.) Fosberg
- Leptostigma pilosum (Benth.) Fosberg
- Leptostigma reptans (F.Muell.) Fosberg
- Leptostigma setulosum (Hook.f.) Fosberg
- Leptostigma weberbaueri Fosberg
