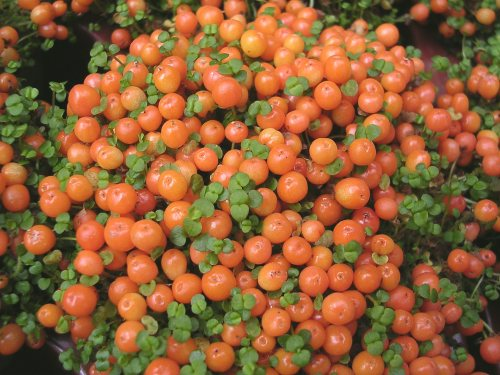

Scientific classification
- Kingdom: Plantae
- Clade: Tracheophytes
- Clade: Angiosperms
- Clade: Eudicots
- Clade: Asterids
- Order: Gentianales
- Family: Rubiaceae
- Genus: Nertera
- Species: N. granadensis

Binomial name
- Nertera granadensis Druce

Synonyms
- List: Coprosma dentata (Elmer) Heads; Coprosma granadensis (Mutis ex L.f.) Heads; Coprosma nertera F.Muell.; Coprosma taiwaniana (Masam.) Heads; Cunina sanfuentes Clos; Erythrodanum alsiniforme Thouars; Erythrodanum majus Thouars; Geoherpum alsinifolium Willd. ex Schult.; Gomozia americana Mirb.; Gomozia granadensis Mutis ex L.f.; Logania dentata (Elmer) Hayata; Mitchella ovata DC. nom. inval.; Nertera adsurgens DC.; Nertera assurgens Thouars; Nertera dentata Elmer; Nertera depressa Banks & Sol. ex Gaertn.; Nertera montana Colenso; Nertera repens Ruiz & Pav. nom. illeg.; Nertera taiwaniana Masam.; Nertera tetrasperma Kunth; Peratanthe cubensis Urb.; Peratanthe ekmanii Urb.

= Nertera granadensis =

Species of flowering plant

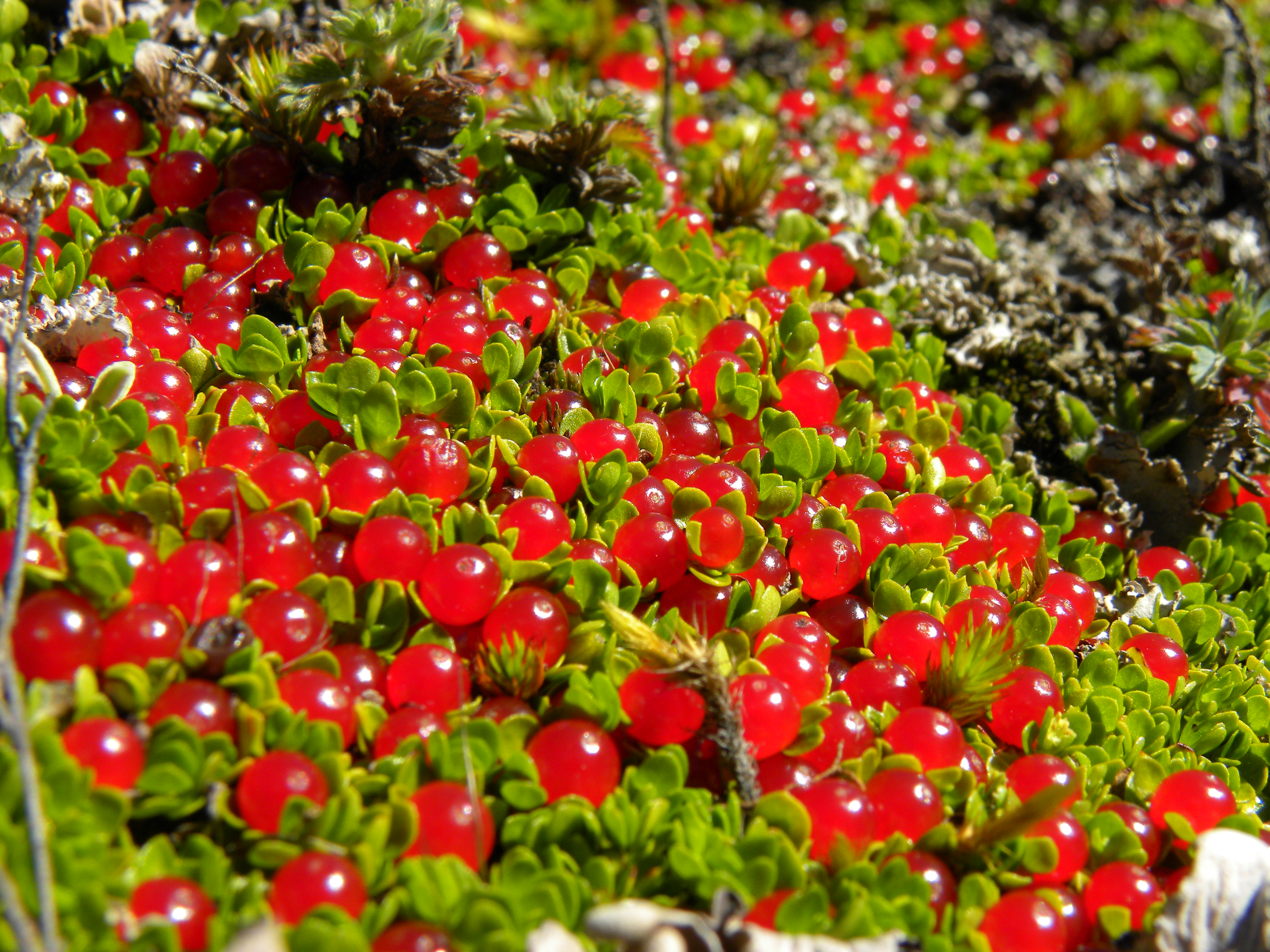
Nertera granadensis in fruit on Cerro de la Muerte, Costa Rica

Nertera granadensis, also known as coral bead plant, pin-cushion plant, coral moss, or English baby tears, is a plant in the family Rubiaceae with orange berries, of the genus Nertera. Nertera granadensis with an unusually extensive transcontinental distribution surrounding the Pacific Ocean, occurring from southern Chile and western Argentina north to Guatemala, and in Hawaii, New Zealand, eastern Australia, Indonesia, Malaysia, Papua New Guinea, the Philippines and Taiwan, possibly due to its cultivation as ground-cover. In tropical biomes of the western Pacific, Nertera granadensis only occurs at high altitudes. It does also occur on the Juan Fernández Islands. It is grown as an ornamental plant in gardens, and the name given to the plant in Mapudungun and Chilean Spanish is rucachucao. The name granadensis derives from New Granada, the old name of Colombia.

== Care and maintenance ==
As a houseplant, Nertera granadensis is somewhat difficult to maintain, and it is not recommended for beginners. The soil should provide adequate drainage. It should be kept in a bright, semi-shaded place - a tropic-facing window is ideal - and should not be left in direct sunlight.

During the summer, Nertera granadensis can be kept outdoors, but it still needs to be protected from direct sunlight. Its environment should not be too warm, nor should it go below 8 degrees Celsius (around 45 Fahrenheit) in the winter for the plant to thrive. During the winter and autumn gardeners should wait until the soil dries between watering.

When flowers and berries begin forming in the spring, one should increase watering so that during spring and summer the soil is kept moist at all times. The leaves and berries should be moistened occasionally, but not too frequently, as they could rot. The plant should be fed monthly with a weak solution (water-soluble fertilizers, diluted to half strength, are best) during spring/summer until it begins to flower. When the berries turn black they should be carefully removed.

== Toxicity ==
The plant possesses brightly colored fruit, and can be visually appealing to young children and pets. A publication by some German scientists noted that of 21 children known to have ingested the plant, five showed mild symptoms associated with poisoning, such as tiredness, stomach pains, and vomiting.
