= Joseph Gaertner =

German botanist (1732-1791)

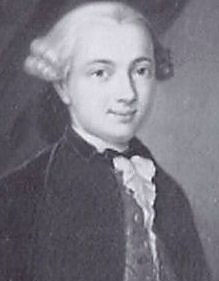
- Born: 12 March 1732; Calw, Württemberg, Germany
- Died: 14 July 1791 (aged 59); Tübingen, Germany
- Education: University of Göttingen
- Known for: Work on seeds, De Fructibus et Seminibus Plantarum
- Scientific career
- Fields: Botany
- Institutions: University of Tübingen, University of St Petersburg
- Academic advisors: Albrecht von Haller
- Author abbrev. (botany): Gaertn.

Joseph Gaertner (12 March 1732 – 14 July 1791) was a German botanist, best known for his work on seeds, De Fructibus et Seminibus Plantarum (1788–1792).

== Biography ==
He was born in Calw, and studied in Göttingen under Albrecht von Haller. He was primarily a naturalist, but also worked at physics and zoology. He travelled extensively to visit other naturalists. He was professor of anatomy in Tübingen in 1760, and was appointed professor of botany at St Petersburg in 1768, but returned to Calw in 1770. Gaertner made back cross to convert one species into another. Back cross increases nuclear gene frequency His observations were: 1. Dominance of traits 2. Equal contribution of male and female to the progeny 3. No variation in F1 (first generation of descendants) 4. Large variation in F2 (second generation of descendants) including parental and intermediate types 5. Some of F2 plants had entirely new traits but he was unable to give possible explanation for observed data which was but brilliantly done by Mendel

Julius Sachs writes

"[H]e gives us the impression of a modern man of science more than any other botanist of the 18th century, with the exception of Koelreuter. He knew how to communicate with clearness of language and perspicuity of arrangement whatever he gathered of general importance from each investigation.... [H]is great work was at once an inexhaustible mine of single well-ascertained facts, and a guide to the morphology of the organs of fructification and to its application to systematic botany."

== De Fructibus ==
By 1770, he had already begun work on his De Fructibus et Seminibus Plantarum, but thereafter he gave himself up almost entirely to it, becoming nearly blind through his persistent studies, partly with the microscope. The work's minutely accurate descriptions, comprising a thousand and more species, introduced a new era in plant morphology. The scientific value of the book was much increased by the addition of 180 copper-plate engravings.

The genus of plants Gaertnera in Rubiaceae was named after him.
