= Izatha quinquejacula =

Conservation status
- Data Deficit (NZ TCS)

Scientific classification
- Kingdom: Animalia
- Phylum: Arthropoda
- Clade: Pancrustacea
- Class: Insecta
- Order: Lepidoptera
- Family: Oecophoridae
- Genus: Izatha
- Species: I. quinquejacula

Binomial name
- Izatha quinquejacula Hoare, 2010

Species of moth

Izatha quinquejacula is a species of moth in the family Oecophoridae. It is only found on the Three Kings Islands. In 2025 this species was classified as "data deficient" under the New Zealand Threat Classification System.

== Taxonomy and etymology ==
This species was first described by Robert J. B. Hoare in 2010. It was first collected by Peter M. Johns in 1963.

== Description ==
The wingspan of this species is 19–23 mm for males and about 26 mm for females. The species is similar in appearance to I. epiphanes, I. mesoschista, and I. haumu. However I. quinquejacula can be distinguished from I. epiphanes as it has a less noticeable discal spot as well as a fishtail shaped mark above this spot on its forewings. It can be distinguished from I. mesoschista, and I. haumu. as it has a 3 shaped black mark on the main vein running along the leading edge of its wing which is not found on the forewings of those two species.

== Distribution ==
This species is endemic to New Zealand. It is only found on the Great Island in the Three Kings Islands.

== Biology and behaviour ==
Little is known of the biology of this species and the larvae are as yet unknown. Adults have been recorded on the wing in November and December.

== Conservation status ==
In 2025 this species was classified by the New Zealand Department of Conservation as "data deficient" under the New Zealand Threat Classification System. I. quinquejacula is an island endemic and range restricted.
