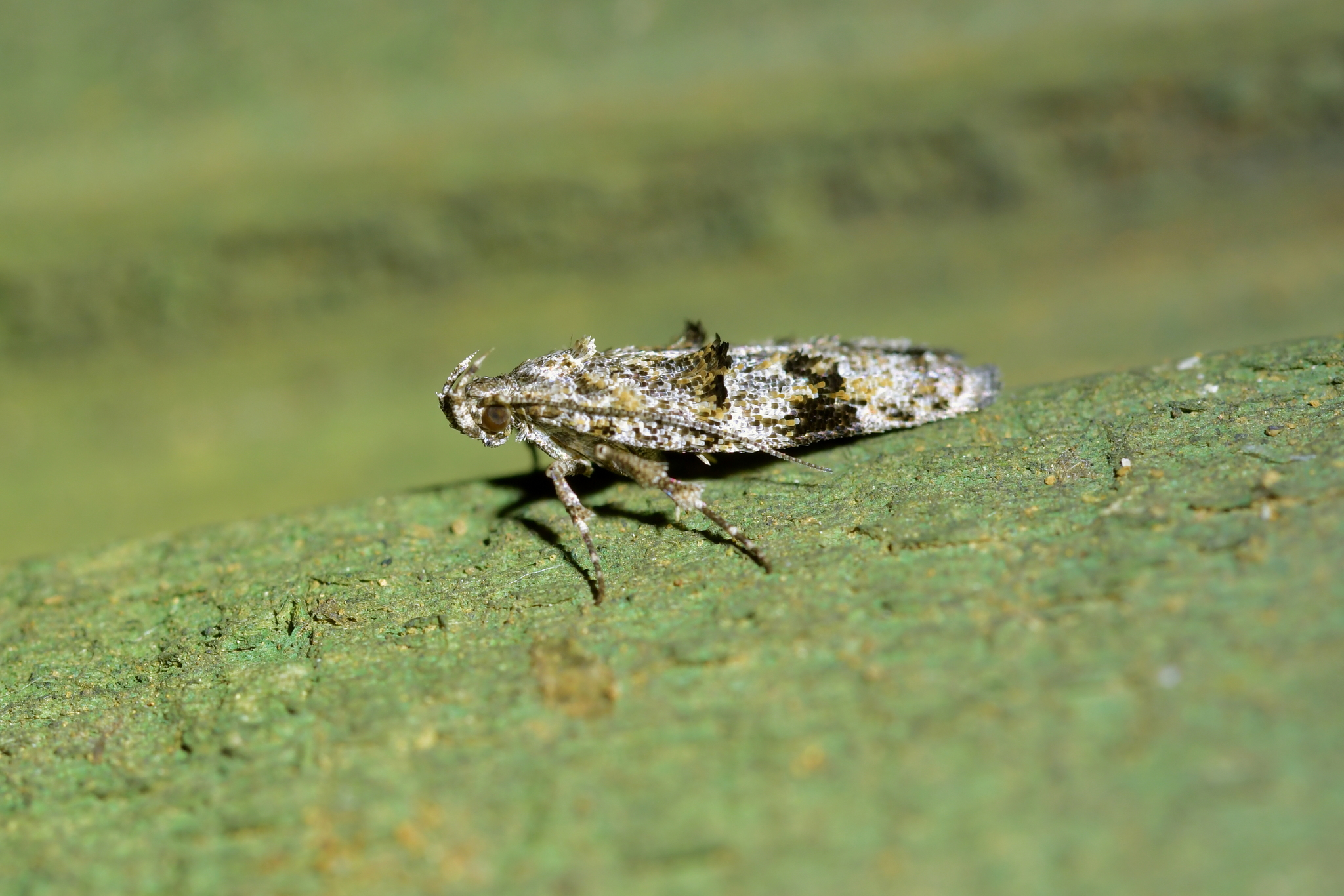
- Izatha minimira found near Ngunguru in the Northland Region

Scientific classification
- Kingdom: Animalia
- Phylum: Arthropoda
- Class: Insecta
- Order: Lepidoptera
- Family: Oecophoridae
- Genus: Izatha
- Species: I. minimira

Binomial name
- Izatha minimira Hoare, 2010

= Izatha minimira =

Species of moth

Izatha minimira is a species of moth in the family Oecophoridae. It is endemic to New Zealand. This species is classified as "At Risk, Naturally Uncommon" by the Department of Conservation.

== Taxonomy ==
This species was first described by Robert J. B. Hoare in 2010. The epithet of the name of the species refers to the appearance of the moth as it resembles a miniature Izatha mira. The holotype specimen is held at the New Zealand Arthropod Collection.

== Description ==
The wingspan is about 12.5 mm for males and 13–17.5 mm for females. This species is similar in appearance to I. metadelta but lacks the areas of golden-orange spine like scales on its forewings. It is also similar to I. mira but the ranges of these two species do not overlap nor does I. minimira have the sharply pointed vertex nor the white terminal bands on the abdominal segments of I. mira. Also I. minimira is noticeably smaller in size.

== Distribution ==
It is endemic to New Zealand, where it is only known from the northern North Island. It is found in the Northland, Auckland, Coromandel and the Bay of Plenty areas.

== Biology and behaviour ==
Little is known of the biology of this species and larvae are unknown. The adult moths are on the wing late in the season from January through to April. The females of this species are attracted to light but it appears the males are less so.

== Conservation status ==
This species has been classified as having the "At Risk, Naturally Uncommon" conservation status under the New Zealand Threat Classification System.
