= Izatha walkerae =

Conservation status
- Data Deficit (NZ TCS)

Scientific classification
- Kingdom: Animalia
- Phylum: Arthropoda
- Clade: Pancrustacea
- Class: Insecta
- Order: Lepidoptera
- Family: Oecophoridae
- Genus: Izatha
- Species: I. walkerae

Binomial name
- Izatha walkerae Hoare, 2010

Species of moth endemic to New Zealand

Izatha walkerae is a lichen tuft moth in the family Oecophoridae. It is endemic to New Zealand. In 2025 this species was classified as "data deficient" under the New Zealand Threat Classification System.

== Taxonomy and etymology ==
This species was described by Robert J. B. Hoare in 2010. Prior to its formal description this species was referred to as Izatha sp. "whorled antennae". The species is named in honour of Annette Walker, who captured the holotype. The holotype specimen is held at the New Zealand Arthropod Collection.

== Description ==
The wingspan is 18–20 mm for males. The female has yet to be described. This species is very similar in appearance to I. copiosella but I. walkerae can be distinguished by its whorls of long dark sensilla on its antennae as well as its distinctive genitalia.

== Distribution ==
This species is endemic to New Zealand. It is known from the north-eastern South Island. Specimens have been collected at Port Underwood Road approximately 4 km south of Curious Cove in Marlborough, and at Lake Tennyson in Canterbury.

== Biology and behaviour ==
Very little is known of the biology of this species. Adults have been recorded in November and January. This species has been collected with a Malaise trap. It has been hypothesised that this species is active during the day as the eyes of I. walkerae have a nude periorbital strip which is correlated with diurnal activity. The host plants of this species are unknown.

== Conservation status ==
In 2025 this species was classified by the New Zealand Department of Conservation as "data deficient" under the New Zealand Threat Classification System.
