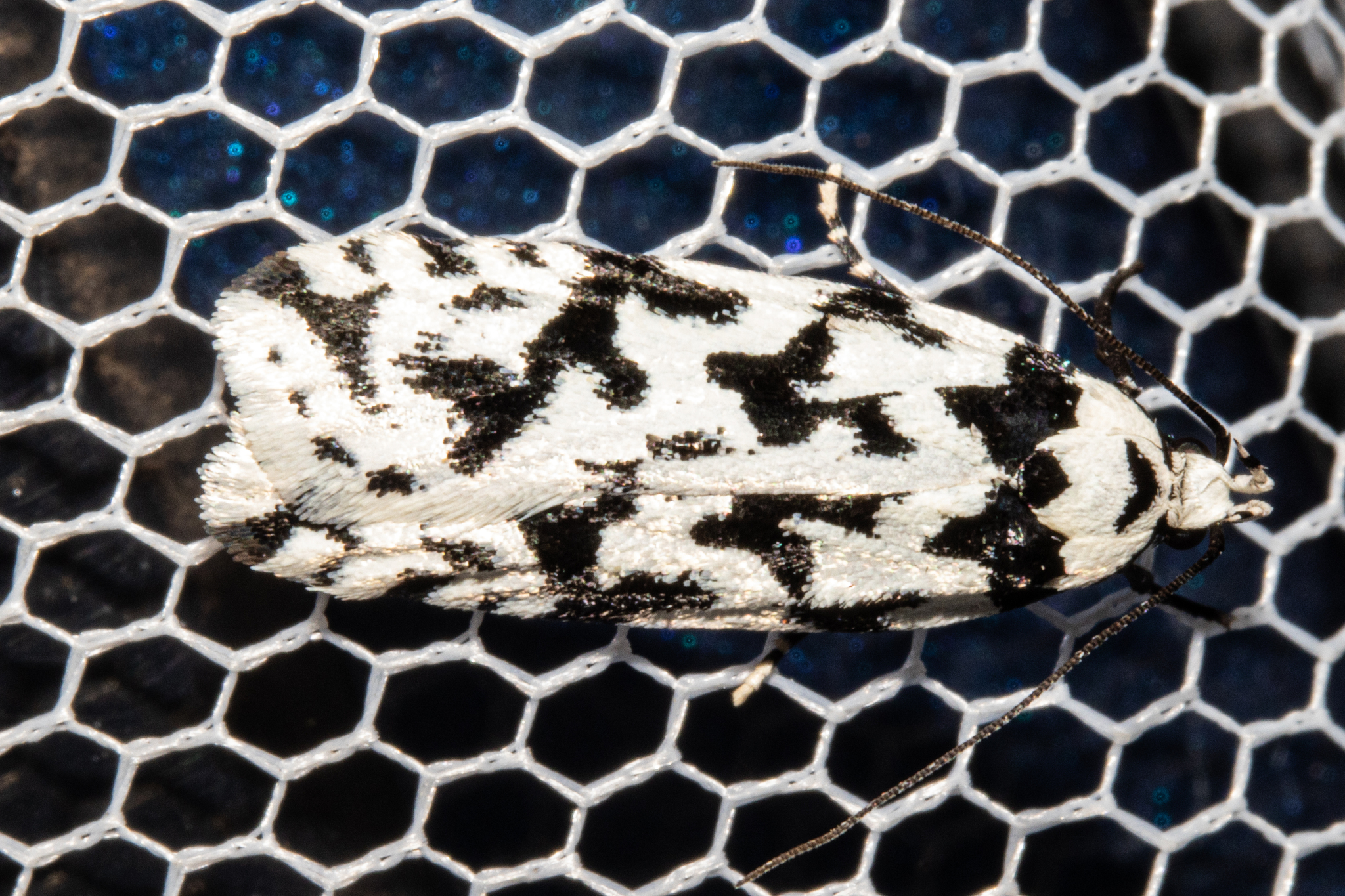

Scientific classification
- Kingdom: Animalia
- Phylum: Arthropoda
- Class: Insecta
- Order: Lepidoptera
- Family: Oecophoridae
- Genus: Izatha
- Species: I. acmonias

Binomial name
- Izatha acmonias Philpott, 1921

= Izatha acmonias =

Species of moth

Izatha acmonias is a moth of the family Oecophoridae. It was first described by Alfred Philpott in 1921. This species is endemic to New Zealand, where it is known from the western parts of the South Island. Much of the life history of this species is known however it has been hypothesised that larvae feed on dead Hoheria lyallii. Adults are on the wing from November until January.

== Taxonomy ==
This species was first described by Alfred Philpott in 1921. Philpott Hudson discussed and illustrated this species in 1928 in his book The butterflies and moths of New Zealand however Hudson included I. acmonias, I. picarella, and I. lignyarcha in his concept of that species. In 1988 John S. Dugdale, thinking that this species was the same as I. picarellas, synonymised I. acmonias with that species. Robert J. B. Hoare reinstated I. acmonias in 2010. The male holotype specimen, collected in Tisbury by Philpott, is held at the New Zealand Arthropod Collection.

== Description ==
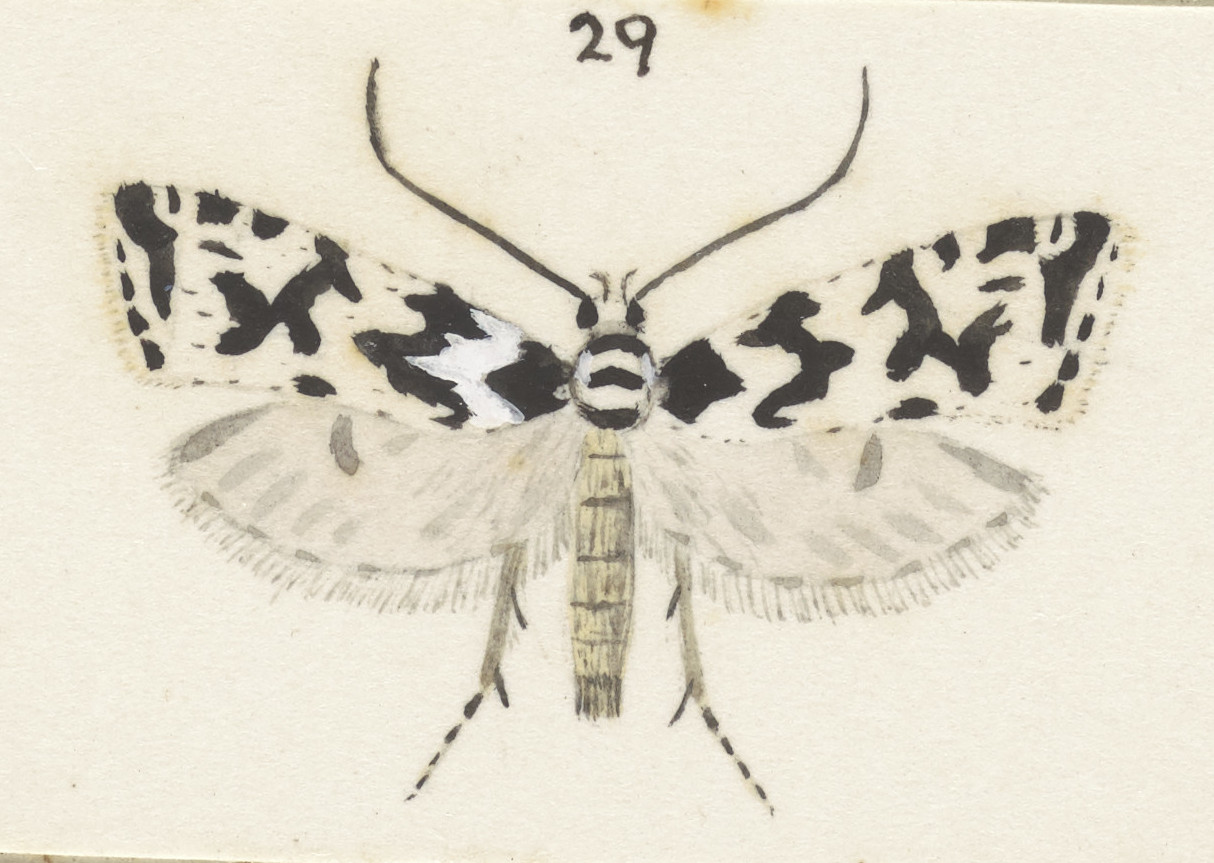
Illustration of male.

As at 2010 the larvae of this species are unknown.

The wingspan is 21–28.5 mm for males and 23–35 mm for females.

Philpott described this species as follows:

♂♀. 25-28mm. Head white. Palpi white. Antennae brownish-black. Thorax white, anterior margin, a triangular central anterior mark, and a annulated with white. Forewings moderate, costa rather strongly arched basally, apex rounded, termen gently rounded, slightly oblique; white, markings black; a broad basal band including a minute spot of white next thorax, outer edge nearly straight to fold, thence produced along fold to an acute point, from whence it returns inwardly oblique to dorsum; an irregular fascia from costa at 1/4 to fold before 1/2, its apex turned inward along fold and almost connecting with basal band, a strong inward tooth beneath costa and a similar outward one at middle; a strong fascia from costa at 1/2 to before tornus, having two prominent inward projections, the first beneath costa and the second, which points obliquely downwards, at middle; an irregular spot on tornus at 2/3; a series of three spots, the central one twice the size of the others, between central fascia and apex; a small spot beneath first costal spot, and a larger one, touching central fascia, beneath this; a broad inwardly-oblique fascia from apex, somewhat constricted and then expanding as a triangular patch; a series of terminal dots, becoming progressively larger towards tornus: cilia white. Hindwings grey clouded with fuscous; an indistinct discal spot: cilia light fuscous-grey, a broad white bar beneath apex and an obscure dark basal line.

I. acmonias can be confused with I. katadiktya as the latter species overlaps with the southern part of I. acmonias' range. I. acmonias is also unlikely to be distinguishable on external characteristics from either I. lignyarcha or I. picarellas however the species may be distinguished by the male genital characters as well as by their geographical location.

== Distribution ==
This species is endemic to New Zealand and only occurs on the western parts of the South Island.

== Habitat and hosts ==
This species inhabits native forest. Hudson beat specimens from and therefore hypothesised that larvae probably feed on dead Hoheria lyallii.

== Behaviour ==
Much of the life history of this species is unknown. Adults have been recorded on the wing from November to January.
