= Izatha florida =

- Male holotype

Conservation status
- Naturally Uncommon (NZ TCS)

Scientific classification
- Kingdom: Animalia
- Phylum: Arthropoda
- Clade: Pancrustacea
- Class: Insecta
- Order: Lepidoptera
- Family: Oecophoridae
- Genus: Izatha
- Species: I. florida

Binomial name
- Izatha florida Philpott, 1927

Species of moth endemic to New Zealand

Izatha florida, also known as the lichen tuft moth, is a species of moth in the family Oecophoridae. This species was first described by Alfred Philpott in 1927. It is endemic to New Zealand, where it is known from north-west Nelson. This species frequents subalpine habitat. As at 2010 the biology and larvae of this species are unknown. Adults have been recorded on the wing in November and December. They are day flying and are not attracted to light at night. In 2025 this species was classified as having the conservation threat classification of "At Risk, Uncommon" by the Department of Conservation.

== Taxonomy ==
This species was first described by Alfred Philpott in 1927 using three male specimens collected by William Heighway and himself at the Mount Arthur tableland at 4,500 feet (1,400 m). George Hudson discussed and illustrated this species in his 1939 book A supplement to the butterflies and moths of New Zealand. Hudson used one of Philpott's specimens for the description and illustration. In 2010 Robert J. B. Hoare undertook a review of the genus Izatha and confirmed the placement of this species within it. The male holotype is held at the New Zealand Arthropod Collection.

== Description ==
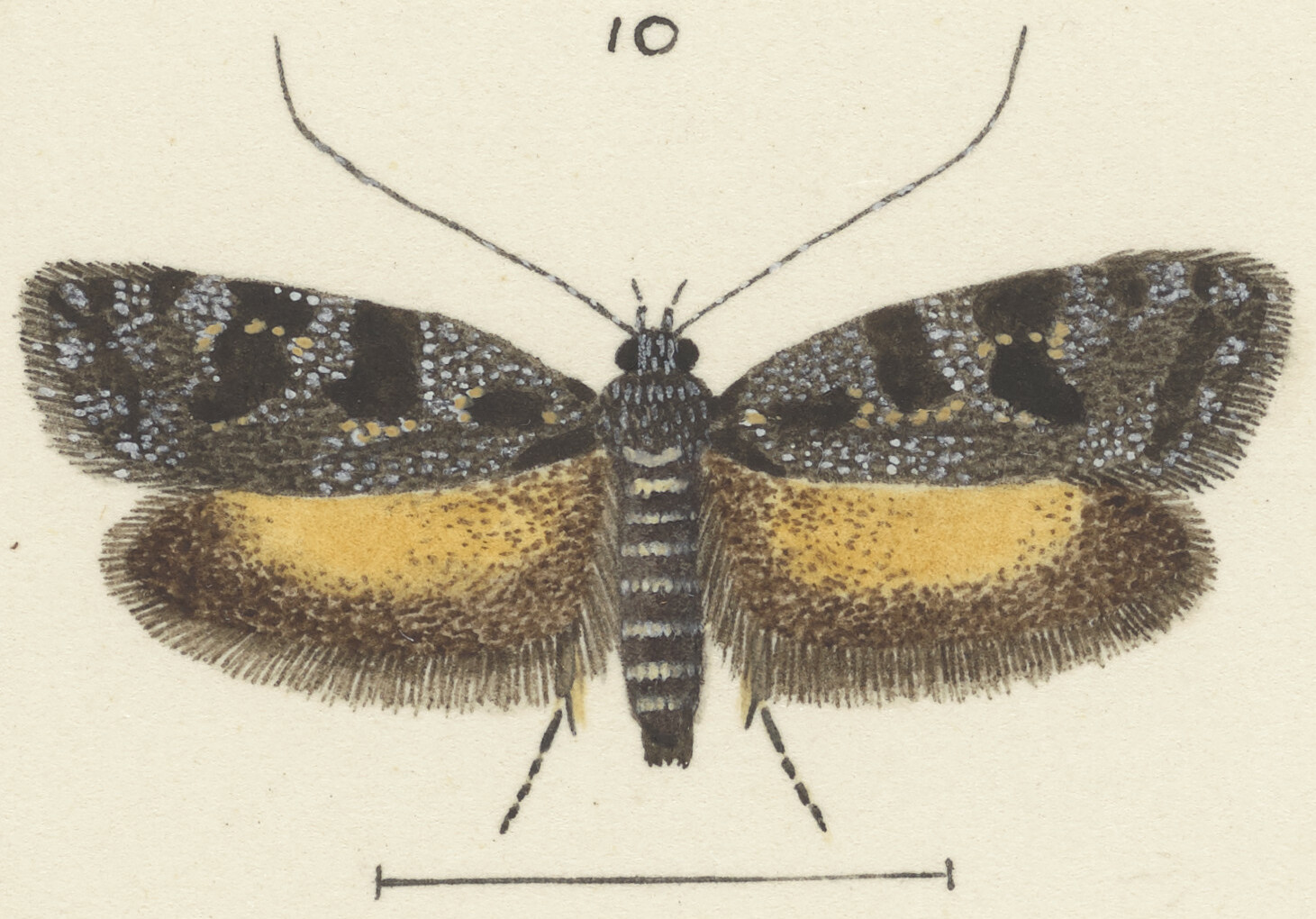
Illustration of male

Philpott described the male of this species as follows:

♂. 15–19 mm. Head, palpi and thorax black sprinkled with white Antennae black with short grey pubescence. Abdomen black, segmental divisions yellowish-white. Legs black, tibiae and tarsi banded with white. Forewings oblong, costa arched at base, thence straight, apex rounded, termen hardly oblique; black tinged with brown and densely irrorated with bluish-white (owing to the tips of many scales being so coloured); markings formed by the elimination of the irroration; an indistinct dentate basal fascia enclosing two tufts of raised scales, one above and the other below fold, both of which contain a few yellow scales; a fairly straight fascia from ⅓ costa to ½ dorsum enclosing similar tufts of raised black and yellow scales; an irregular fascia, containing a few yellow scales, from ⅔ costa to tornus; fringes blackish-fuscous, basal ½ mixed with bluish-white. Hindwings yellow; termen and dorsum broadly dark fuscous; fringes dark fuscous.

Philpott pointed out that this species can be distinguished from others in the same genus as it has parti-coloured hindwings.

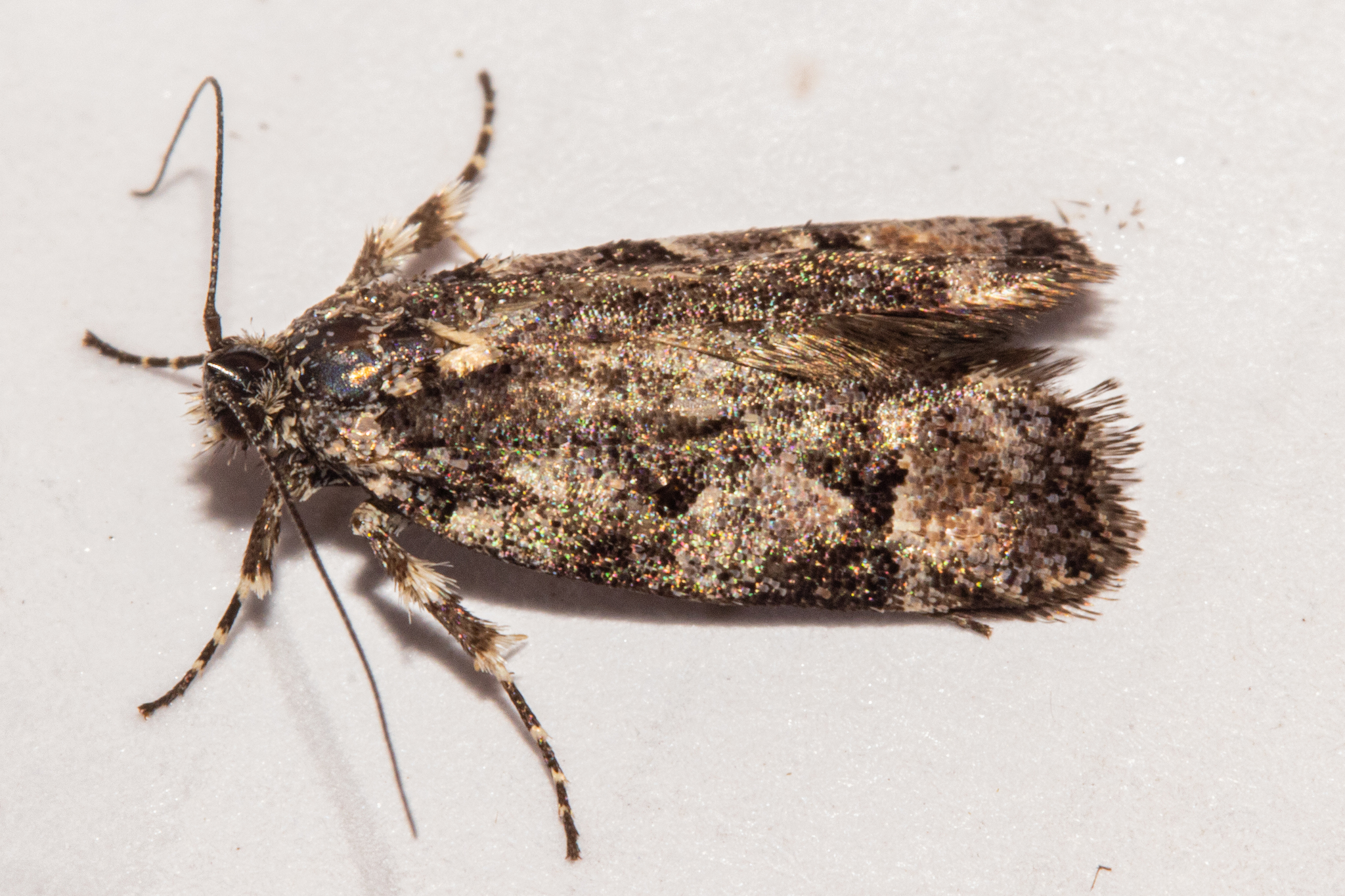
Likely female of I florida.

Hoare, when describing the species, stated that the wingspan is between 14.5–20 mm for males. As at 2010 the female of this species was unknown. However a live specimen that may possibly be female was observed in 2022.

Hoare stated that I. florida and I. mira are likely sister species as studies of the male genitalia of both show they are very similar.

== Distribution ==
I. florida is endemic to New Zealand. It can only be found in the northern parts of the South Island, specifically north-west Nelson.

== Habitat ==
This species frequents subalpine habitat.

== Life cycle ==
As at 2010 the life cycle and larvae of this species is unknown.

== Behaviour ==
Adult males have been recorded on the wing in November and December. They are day flying. Adults exhibit indifference to nocturnal illumination. The day-flying aspect of this moth, along with the early in the season flight time, as well as the subalpine habitat preference of this species, has resulted in a lack of specimens and observations.

== Conservation status ==
In 2025 this species was classified by the New Zealand Department of Conservation as "at risk, uncommon" under the New Zealand Threat Classification System. This species obtained this classification as it is regarded as being significantly threatened by climate change and there is a lack of data on both the population size as well as how the population of this species is changing over time.
