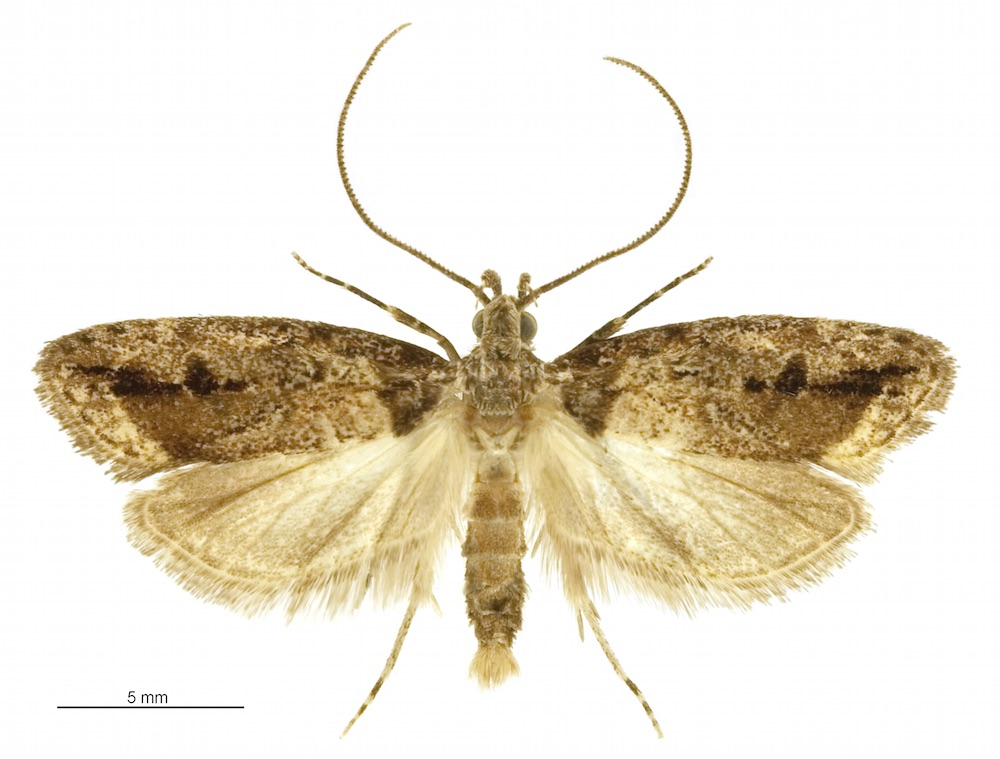
- Izatha caustopa

Scientific classification
- Kingdom: Animalia
- Phylum: Arthropoda
- Class: Insecta
- Order: Lepidoptera
- Family: Oecophoridae
- Subfamily: Oecophorinae
- Genus: Izatha; Walker, 1864

Species
- See text

Synonyms
- Aochleta Meyrick, 1883; Semiocosma Meyrick, 1883; Zirosaris Meyrick, 1910

= Izatha =

Genus of moths

Izatha is a genus of moths of the family Oecophoridae. They are commonly known as lichen tuft moths. This genus was first described by Francis Walker in 1864 and is endemic to New Zealand. In 1915 Edward Meyrick synonymised the genus Semiocosma with this genus. The original description did not have a note about the etymology of the name Izatha. The meaning of the name is not clear.

== Species ==
- attactella-group:
  - Izatha attactella Walker, 1864
  - Izatha blepharidota Hoare, 2010
  - Izatha voluptuosa Hoare, 2010
  - Izatha austera (Meyrick, 1883)
  - Izatha psychra (Meyrick, 1883)
- mira-group
  - Izatha copiosella (Walker, 1864)
  - Izatha walkerae Hoare, 2010
  - Izatha florida Philpott, 1927
  - Izatha mira Philpott, 1913
- apodoxa-group
  - Izatha notodoxa Hoare, 2010
  - Izatha katadiktya Hoare, 2010
  - Izatha apodoxa (Meyrick, 1888)
  - Izatha acmonias Philpott, 1921
  - Izatha lignyarcha Hoare, 2010
  - Izatha picarella (Walker, 1864)
- balanophora-group
  - Izatha metadelta Meyrick, 1905
  - Izatha balanophora (Meyrick, 1897)
  - Izatha churtoni Dugdale, 1988
  - Izatha dulcior Hoare, 2010
  - Izatha epiphanes (Meyrick, 1884)
  - Izatha mesoschista Meyrick, 1931
  - Izatha haumu Hoare, 2010
  - Izatha quinquejacula Hoare, 2010
  - Izatha heroica Philpott, 1926
  - Izatha hudsoni Dugdale, 1988
  - Izatha huttonii (Butler, 1879)
  - Izatha peroneanella (Walker, 1864)
  - Izatha taingo Hoare, 2010
- oleariae-group
  - Izatha oleariae Dugdale, 1971
  - Izatha spheniscella Hoare, 2010
  - Izatha prasophyta (Meyrick, 1884)
- caustopa-group
  - Izatha caustopa (Meyrick, 1892)
  - Izatha dasydisca Hoare, 2010
  - Izatha manubriata Meyrick, 1923
- convulsella-group
  - Izatha convulsella (Walker, 1864)
  - Izatha gekkonella Hoare, 2010
  - Izatha gibbsi Hoare, 2010
  - Izatha minimira Hoare, 2010
  - Izatha rigescens Meyrick, 1929
  - Izatha phaeoptila (Meyrick, 1905)
