= Izatha oleariae =

Scientific classification
- Kingdom: Animalia
- Phylum: Arthropoda
- Class: Insecta
- Order: Lepidoptera
- Family: Oecophoridae
- Genus: Izatha
- Species: I. oleariae

Binomial name
- Izatha oleariae Dugdale, 1971

Species of moth

Izatha oleariae is a species of moth in the family Oecophoridae. It is endemic to New Zealand. This species is classified as "At Risk, Naturally Uncommon" by the Department of Conservation. It is only found on the Snares Islands.

== Taxonomy ==
This species was first described by John S. Dugdale in 1971 using specimens collected at Station Point at the Snares Islands by Peter M. Johns. In 2010 Robert J. B. Hoare discussed this species and gave a detailed description of the same. The holotype specimen is held at the New Zealand Arthropod Collection.

== Description ==
Dugdale originally described the species as follows:

Adult fully winged; eyes not reduced; frons and vertex planoconvex, maxillary palpi minute, pollected, labial palpi with apical segment untufted at 1/2 length but with a band of black scales. Head, thorax, forewings grey, forewings with markings in brownish grey, viz.: an oblique mark on the costa basally, a 2nd at 1/3, connecting a diffuse blotch on the discal cell; another distinct spot at the apex of the discal cell; costal apex, and termen with an interrupted marginal series of black scales. Hindwings and abdomen dark grey. ♀︎ similar but generally more pallid. Antennae of ♂︎ setulose in whorls, setulae longer than segment width. Body length (vertex-wing tip) 8.5-9.5 mm (both sexes).

== Distribution ==
This species is endemic to New Zealand. It is only known from the subantarctic Snares Islands.

== Biology and behaviour ==
The larvae of this species are wood borers. Adults are on wing from November to February.

== Host plants and habitat ==
A host species of the larvae of this moth is Olearia lyallii. Larvae have also been collected in bark of Brachyglottis stewartiae.

== Conservation status ==
This species has been classified as having the "At Risk, Naturally Uncommon" conservation status under the New Zealand Threat Classification System.
