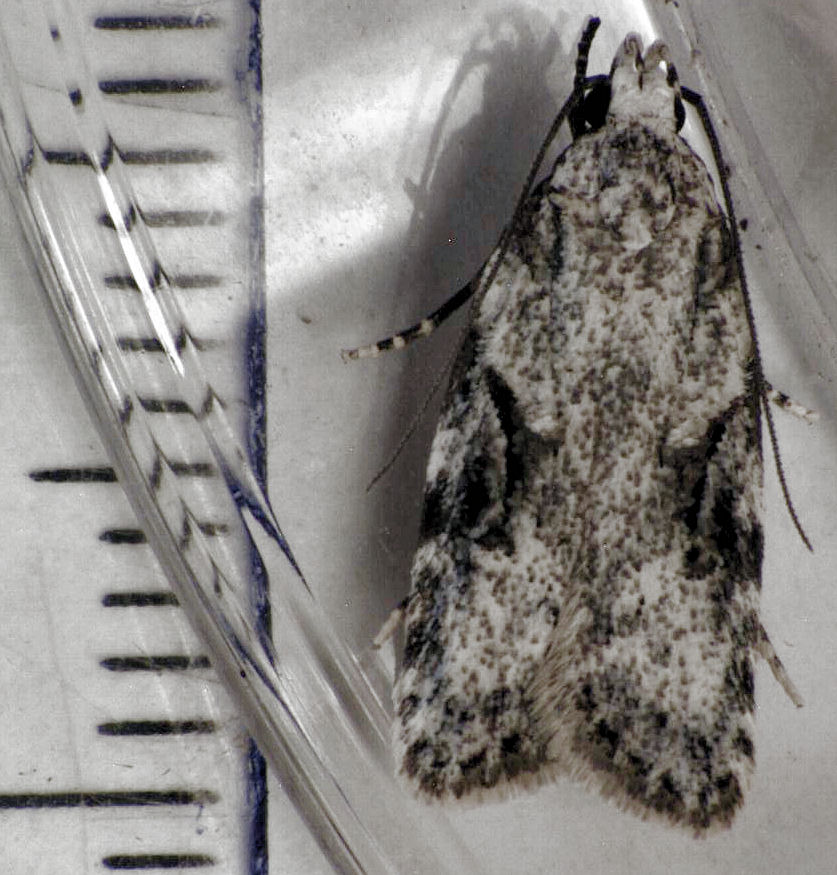

Scientific classification
- Kingdom: Animalia
- Phylum: Arthropoda
- Class: Insecta
- Order: Lepidoptera
- Family: Oecophoridae
- Genus: Izatha
- Species: I. mesoschista

Binomial name
- Izatha mesoschista Meyrick, 1931

= Izatha mesoschista =

Species of moth

Izatha mesoschista is a moth of the family Oecophoridae. It is endemic to New Zealand.

== Taxonomy ==
This species was described by Edward Meyrick in 1931 using seven specimens collected by George Hudson in Wellington during the months of December and January. Hudson discussed and illustrated the species in his 1928 work The butterflies and moths of New Zealand under the name Izatha balanophora but later corrected his taxonomic error in 1939.

== Description ==
The larva of this species has not been described.

The adult moth has a wingspan of 15.5–21 mm for males and 17–25 mm for females. Adults are on wing from October to February.

The appearance of the adult moths of this species is variable and as a result it was originally confused with Izatha balanophora. However it can be distinguished from this species as I. mesoschista has a bold black line in the middle of the disk on its forewings. This line also assists in distinguishing I. mesoschista from Izatha epiphanes. Other than using their collection location as a guide, it is difficult to distinguish between I. mesoschista and Izatha haumu. I. haumu is found at the top of the North Island and I. mesochista is present south of this locality, over the rest of the North Island. However a male I. mesoschista can be distinguished from both I. haumu and I. epiphanes by the species characteristic three pronged tip of its genitalia.

== Distribution ==
I. mesoschista is endemic to New Zealand. This species has been found throughout the North Island, except the Aupouri Peninsula, Hawkes Bay or the Wairarapa. It is regarded as one of the most common and widespread species in the genus Izatha to be found in the North Island.

== Host plants ==
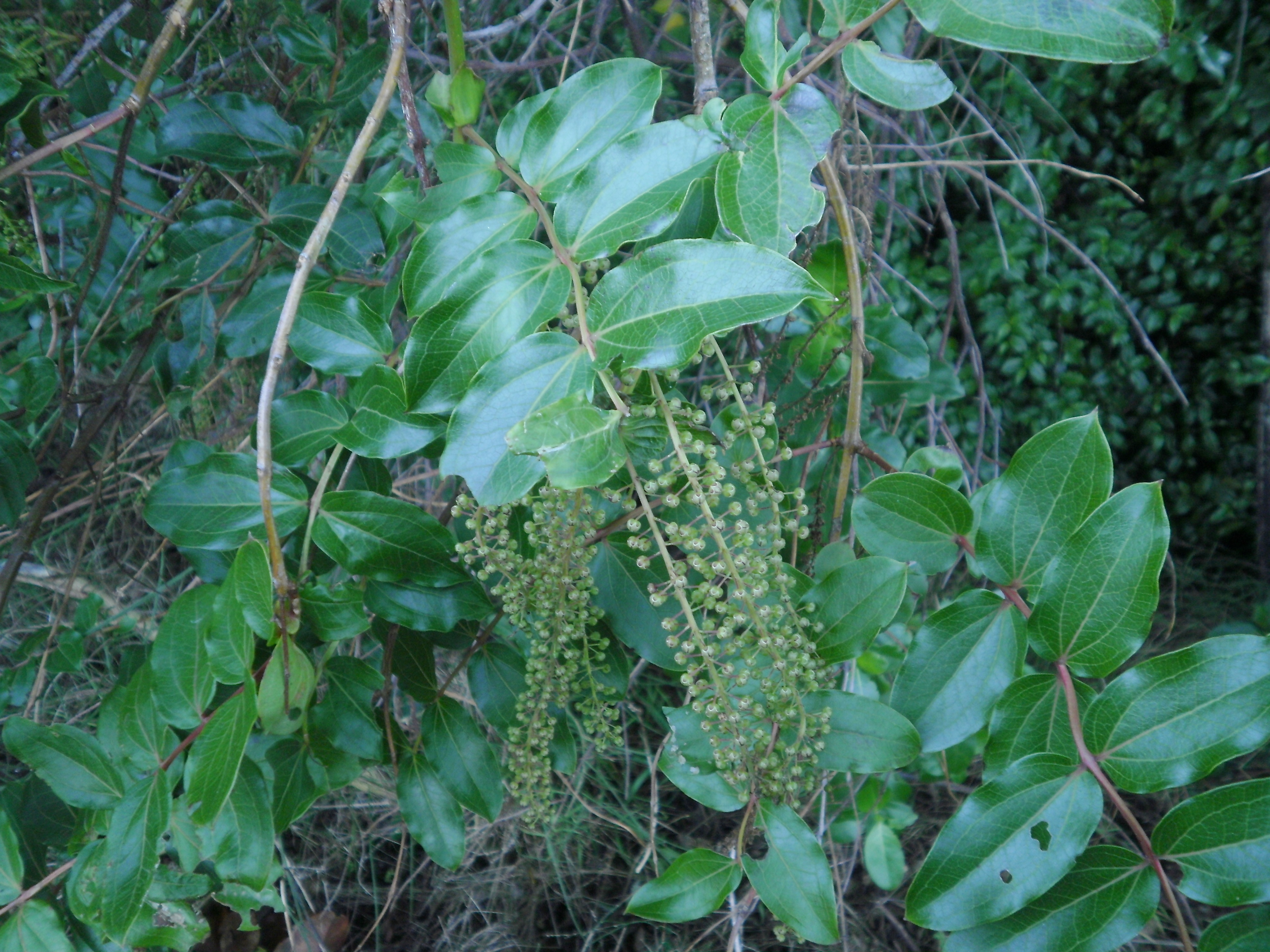
Coriaria arborea

Specimens have been reared from Populus species, presumably from the dead wood, and also from pine logs. Larvae of this species have also been extracted or reared from Coriaria arborea and Coprosma species.

== Trapping techniques ==
This species is readily attracted to light.
