= Izatha dulcior =

Scientific classification
- Kingdom: Animalia
- Phylum: Arthropoda
- Class: Insecta
- Order: Lepidoptera
- Family: Oecophoridae
- Genus: Izatha
- Species: I. dulcior

Binomial name
- Izatha dulcior Hoare, 2010

Species of moth

Izatha dulcior is a species of moth in the family Oecophoridae. It is endemic to New Zealand. This species is classified as "At Risk, Naturally Uncommon" by the Department of Conservation. I. dulcior is the first lepidoptera species described as endemic to the Poor Knights Islands.

== Taxonomy and etymology ==
This species was first described by Robert J. B. Hoare in 2010 using a specimen collected at the Tawhiti Rahi South Ridge on Poor Knights Island on the 3 December 1980 by R.H. Kleinpaste. Hoare named the species Izatha dulcior. The holotype specimen is held at the New Zealand Arthropod Collection.

== Description ==
The wingspan is 18.5–24.5 mm for males and 19.5–20.5 mm for females. In appearance this species is very similar to darker forms of I. epiphanes. However, as mentioned previously, it can be distinguished from this species by the difference in the forewing colouration as well as the structural differences in the male genitalia.

== Distribution ==
The species is endemic to New Zealand. It is the first lepidoptera species to be described as endemic to Poor Knights Islands.

== Behaviour and biology ==
Very little is known of the biology of this species and the larvae are as yet unknown. Adults are on the wing in early December and are attracted to light.

== Conservation status ==
This species has been classified as having the "At Risk, Naturally Uncommon" conservation status under the New Zealand Threat Classification System.
