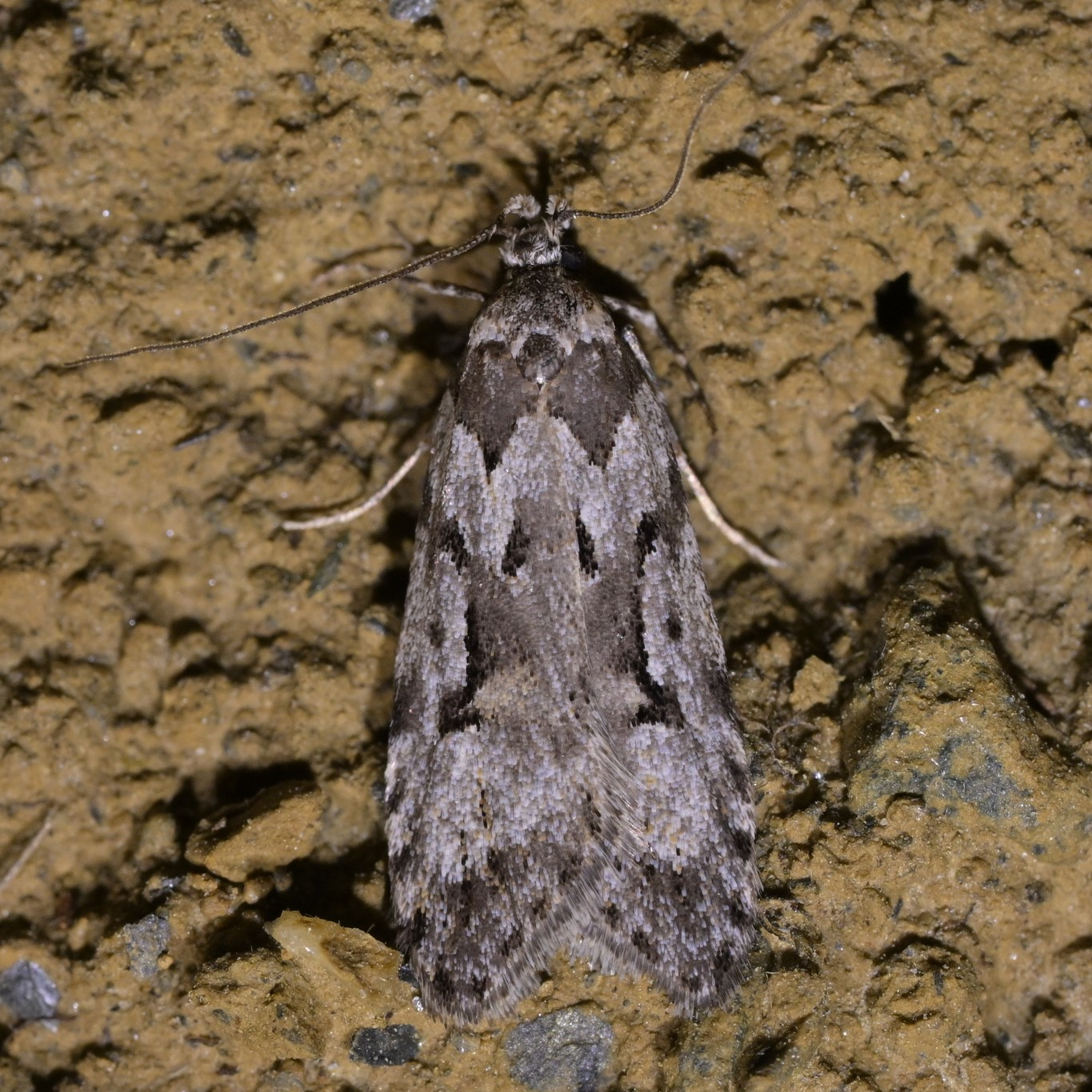

Scientific classification
- Kingdom: Animalia
- Phylum: Arthropoda
- Class: Insecta
- Order: Lepidoptera
- Family: Oecophoridae
- Genus: Izatha
- Species: I. manubriata

Binomial name
- Izatha manubriata Meyrick, 1923

= Izatha manubriata =

Species of moth

Izatha manubriata is a species of moth in the family Oecophoridae. It is endemic to New Zealand, where it is known from the southern South Island only.

== Taxonomy ==
This species was first described by Edward Meyrick in 1923. Meyrick used a specimen collected by George Hudson in the forest at Ben Lomond, Lake Wakatipu in January. Hudson discussed and illustrated the species in his 1928 book The Butterflies and Moths of New Zealand. The holotype specimen is held at the Natural History Museum, London.

== Description ==
The wingspan is 24.5–27.5 mm for males and about 26 mm for females. The wing patternation of this species makes it easy to distinguish from other species in the genus Izatha that are present in the South Island.

Meyrick originally described the species as follows:

♂ 26 mm. Head and thorax grey suffused with white except shoulders. Palpi white, second joint sprinkled with blackish, and with a black subapical ring, terminal joint with black median band. Abdomen grey, segmental margins whitish, anal tuft ochreous-whitish. Forewings elongate, posteriorly rather dilated, costa slightly arched, apex obtuse, termen nearly straight, oblique; grey suffusedly irrorated with white, tinged here and there with ochreous; a small grey basal patch, edge sprinkled with blackish, acutely angulated on fold; small blackish spots on costa at 1/3 and 3/5; stigmata blackish, plical beneath first discal, second discal represented by a small transverse spot from which a blackish streak runs nearly to first, a blackish dot between and above first and second discal; an obscure angulated subterminal shade of whitish suffusion; a marginal series of small blackish-grey spots round posterior part of costa and termen : cilia whitish with two grey shades. Hindwings grey; cilia as in forewings.

== Distribution ==
This species is endemic to New Zealand. It is likely endemic to the Otago Lakes district and adjacent ranges of Central Otago. Along with the type locality of Ben Lomond, the species has also been collected at Mount Aurum, Bold Peak, Queenstown, Moke Lake, Lake Wakatipu, the Garvie Mountains and Pomahaka Valley. Hudson regarded it as a rare species.

== Biology and behaviour ==
Adults are on wing from December to early March. The larvae and biology of this species is unknown as it has never been reared. Only one female specimen has been collected.

== Habitat and host species ==
Hudson stated that this species could be found near the edges of beech forest on the mountains.
