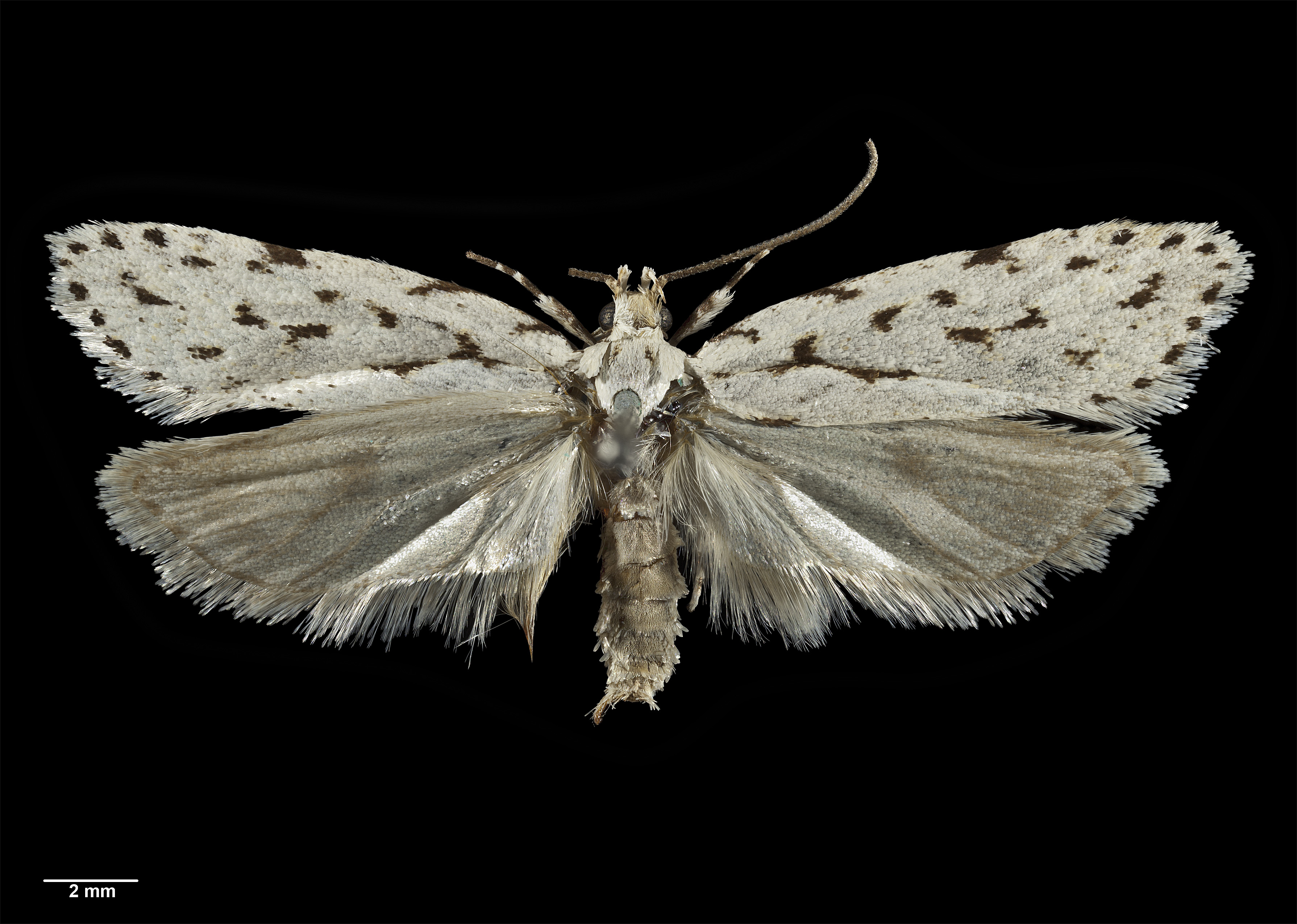

Scientific classification
- Kingdom: Animalia
- Phylum: Arthropoda
- Class: Insecta
- Order: Lepidoptera
- Family: Oecophoridae
- Genus: Izatha
- Species: I. heroica

Binomial name
- Izatha heroica Philpott, 1926

Synonyms
- Izatha toreuma Clarke, 1926

= Izatha heroica =

Species of moth

Izatha heroica is a moth of the family Oecophoridae. It is endemic to New Zealand, where it is widespread in the west part of the South Island. It has been collected in southern beech forests but larvae have been reared on dead kanuka or manuka bushes.

== Taxonomy ==
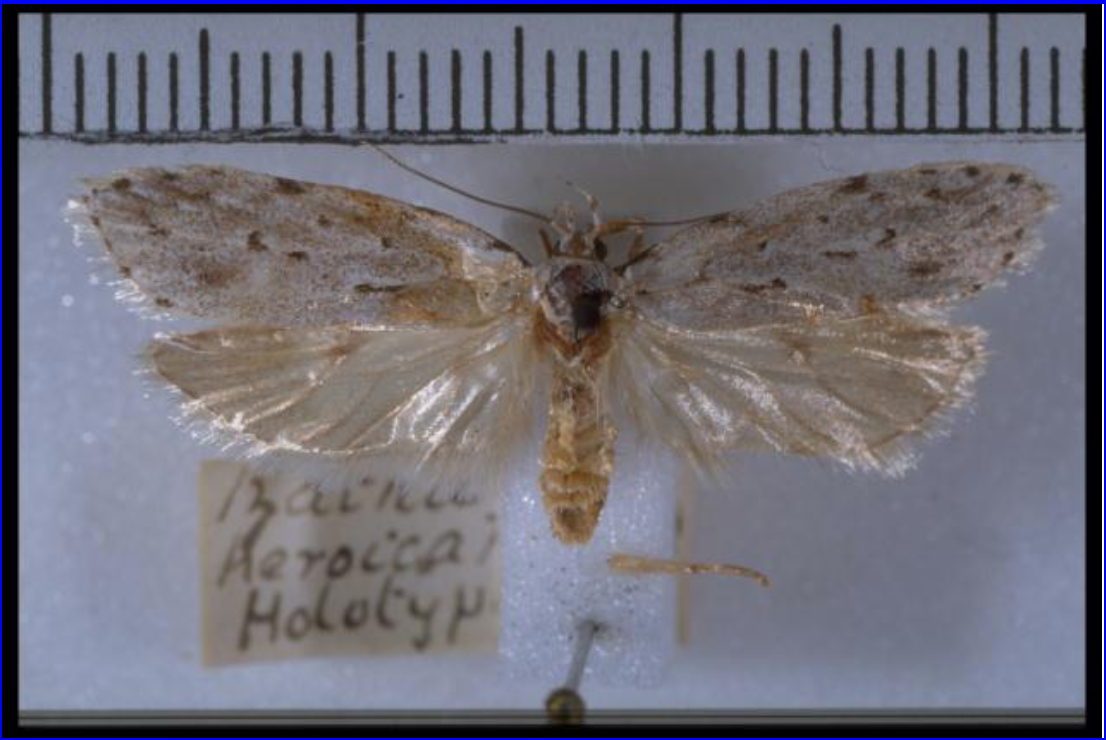
Izatha heroica Philpott, 1926

This species was first described by Alfred Philpott in 1926 using a female specimen taken at Flora River, Mount Arthur in January. The holotype specimen is held at the New Zealand Arthropod Collection. Later that year Charles Edwin Clarke, thinking he was describing a new species, discussed and named the species Izatha toreuma. Clarke used a male specimen obtained from Arthurs Pass in January. This specimen is held at the Auckland War Memorial Museum. This name was synonymised by George Hudson in 1928.

== Description ==
Philpott described the female of the species as follows:

♀. 32 mm. Head and thorax white. Palpi white, basal half of second segment externally black, also an obscure blackish ring near apex, terminal segment with a sprinkling of black scales forming an indefinite ring at tooth. Antennae fuscous mixed with white, basal segment paler. Abdomen ochreous-whitish, apical segment brown. Legs grey-whitish, tarsi banded with dark fuscous. Forewings elongate, broad, costa well arched, apex obtuse, termen rounded, oblique; white, densely irrorated with pale fuscous; seven blackish spots on costa, first at base, second at 1/4, third at 1/2, seventh at apex, and remaining three at equal distances between third and seventh; a blackish spot in disc obliquely beyond second costal, and a linear blackish mark on fold beneath this; three blackish spots forming a triangle in disc at about middle, the most apical obliquely beyond third costal; a less clearly defined spot towards apex; a series of blackish spots on termen: fringes white. Hindwings grey-whitish with an undefined dark discal spot: fringes grey-whitish. A very distinct form, larger and without the dark fasciae of the other white species.

The wingspan is 23–29 mm (0.91–1.14 in) for males and 27–32 mm (1.1–1.3 in) for females. Adults have been recorded in January, February and early March. This species can be distinguished from similar species by its larger size, its greyish coloured forewing and the absence of a conical process on the top of the head.

== Distribution ==
Izatha heroica is endemic to New Zealand and can only be found in the South Island. Although the species prefers the west side of the Island it has been collected in Nelson, Marlborough, Marlborough Sounds, Westland, Fiordland, North Canterbury, Buller, Otago Lakes, Central Otago, and Southland.

== Behaviour and life cycle ==
This species is attracted to light.

== Habitat and host plants ==
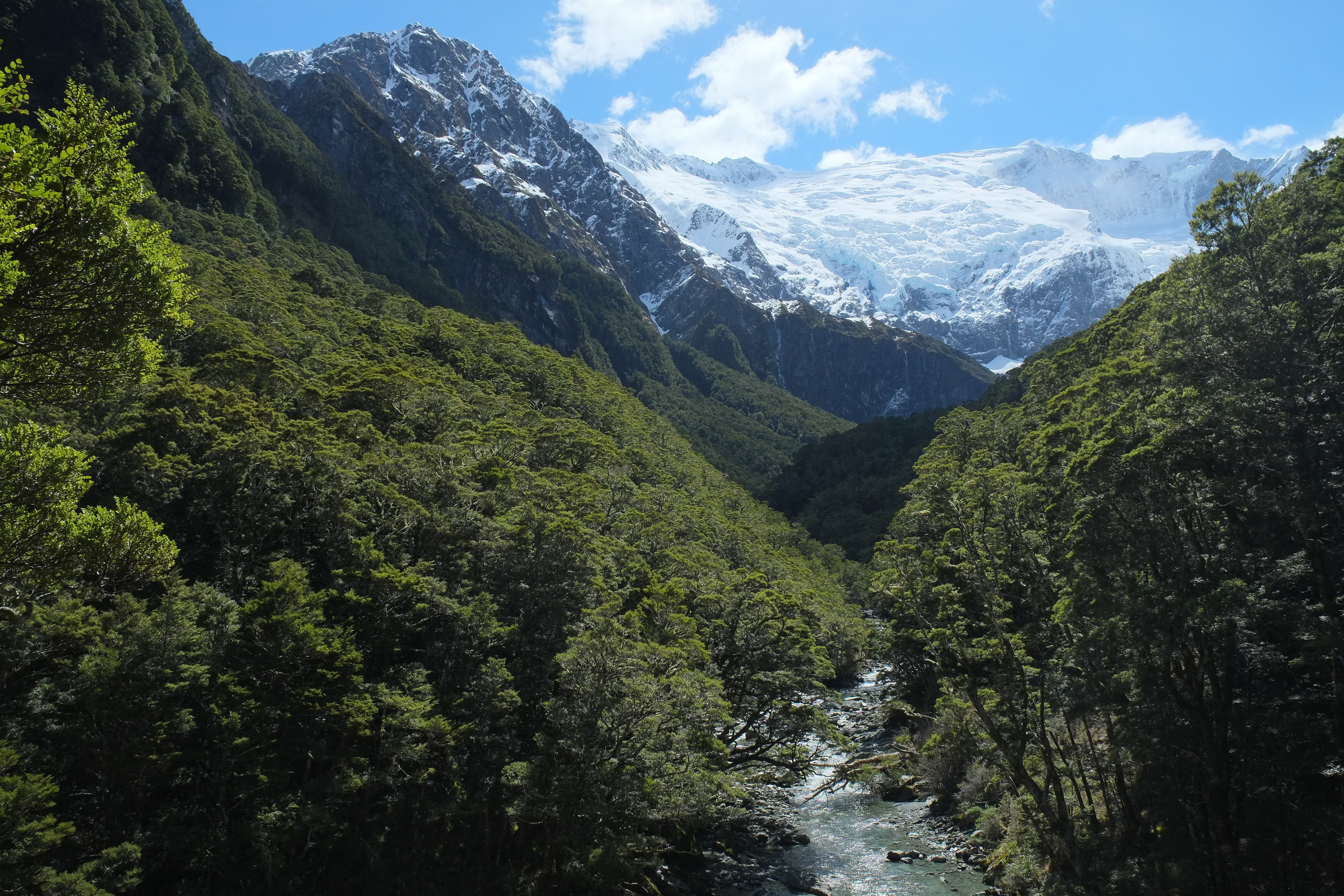
Beech forest habitat of the moth

This species has been found in wetter forests of the western South Island including Nothofagus forest. Larvae have been reared from erect dead Leptospermum. The host may have been Kunzea ericoides or Leptospermum scoparium, since both were placed in the genus Leptospermum at this time. This rearing record has led to the hypothesis that the species is not dependent on beech forest for its survival.
