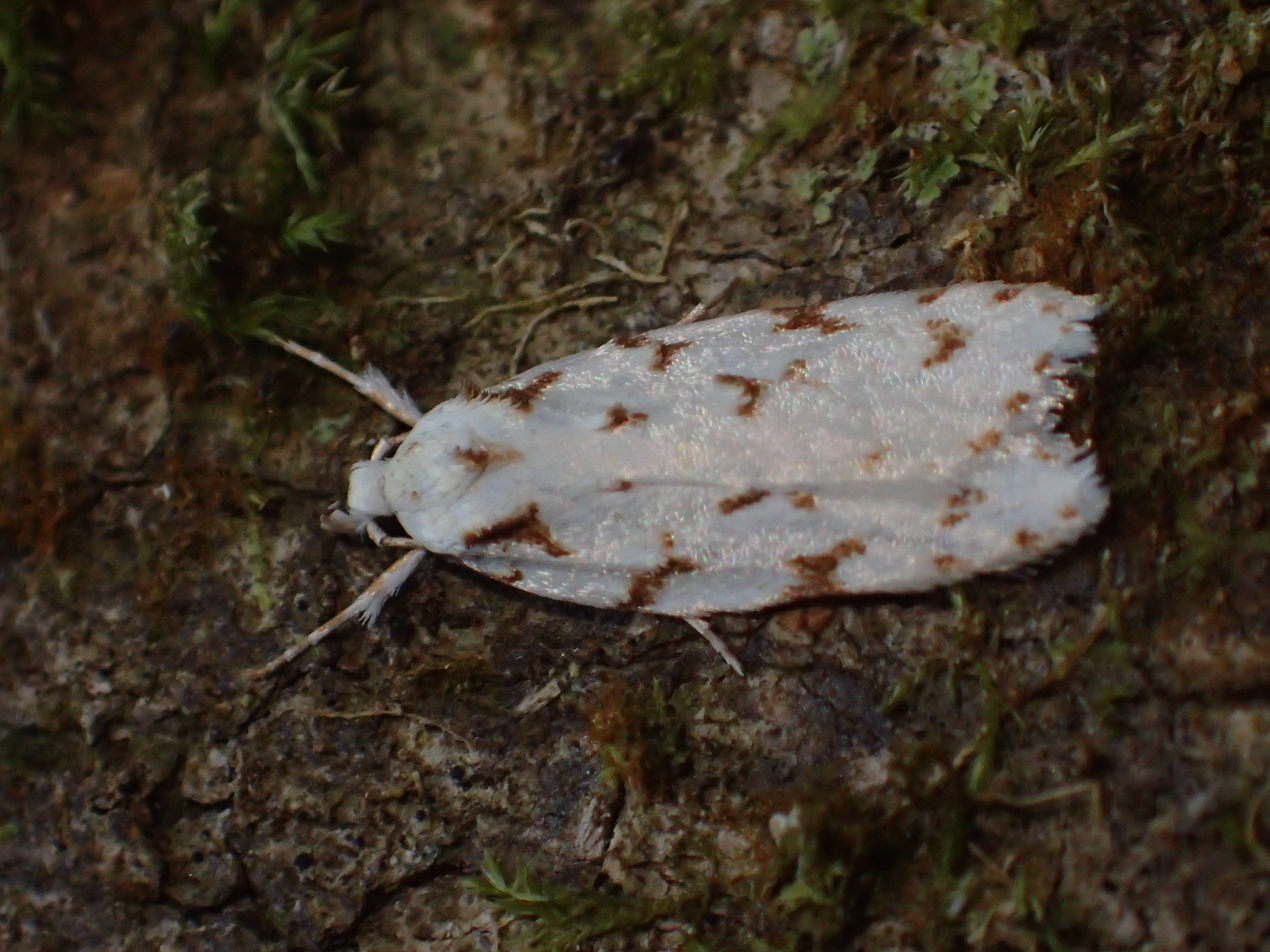

Scientific classification
- Kingdom: Animalia
- Phylum: Arthropoda
- Class: Insecta
- Order: Lepidoptera
- Family: Oecophoridae
- Genus: Izatha
- Species: I. hudsoni

Binomial name
- Izatha hudsoni Dugdale, 1988

= Izatha hudsoni =

Species of moth

Izatha hudsoni is a species of moth in the family Oecophoridae. It is endemic to New Zealand. It is widespread throughout the North Island.

== Taxonomy ==
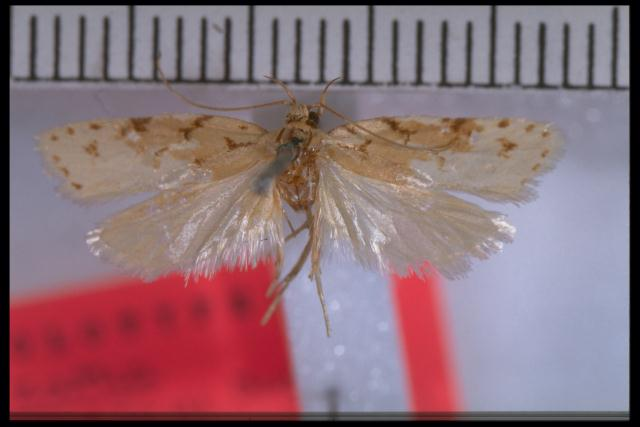
Izatha hudsoni Dugdale, 1988

This species was designated by John S. Dugdale in 1988. The species encapsulates the moth discussed by Edward Meyrick in 1916 and George Hudson in 1928 but not the species discussed by Arthur Gardiner Butler in 1879. The holotype specimen is held at the New Zealand Arthropod Collection.

== Description ==
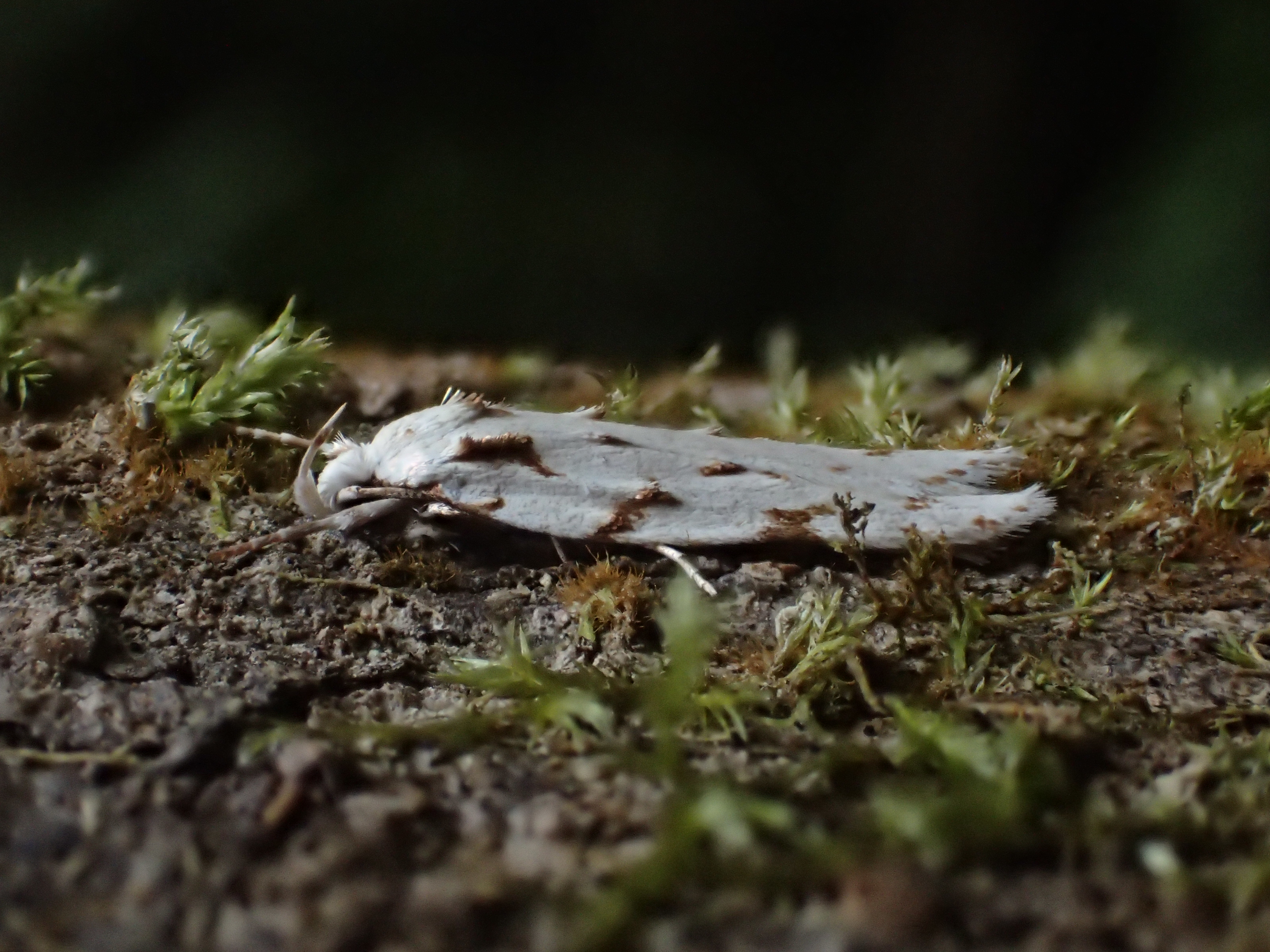

The wingspan is 19–26 mm for males and 20–27.5 mm for females. This species appears visually similar to the white forms of I. peroneanella but I. hudsoni has translucent whitish hindwings whereas I. peroneanella has grey hindwings.

== Distribution ==
This species is endemic to New Zealand. It can be found in Northland, Auckland, Coromandel, Waikato, Bay of Plenty, Taranaki, Taupō, Gisborne, Hawkes Bay and Wellington.

== Biology and behaviour ==
Adults are on wing from November to January.

== Habitat and host species ==
This species prefers forest habitat. Larvae have been reared from mixed dead branches and from dead twigs of Aristotelia serrata.
