= Izatha spheniscella =

Scientific classification
- Kingdom: Animalia
- Phylum: Arthropoda
- Class: Insecta
- Order: Lepidoptera
- Family: Oecophoridae
- Genus: Izatha
- Species: I. spheniscella

Binomial name
- Izatha spheniscella Hoare, 2010

Species of moths

Izatha spheniscella is a moth of the Oecophoridae family. It is endemic to New Zealand, where it is only known from the subantarctic Snares Islands.

The wingspan is 14–15 mm (0.55–0.59 in) for males and about 14 mm for females. Females are brachypterous. Adults have been recorded in December and February.
