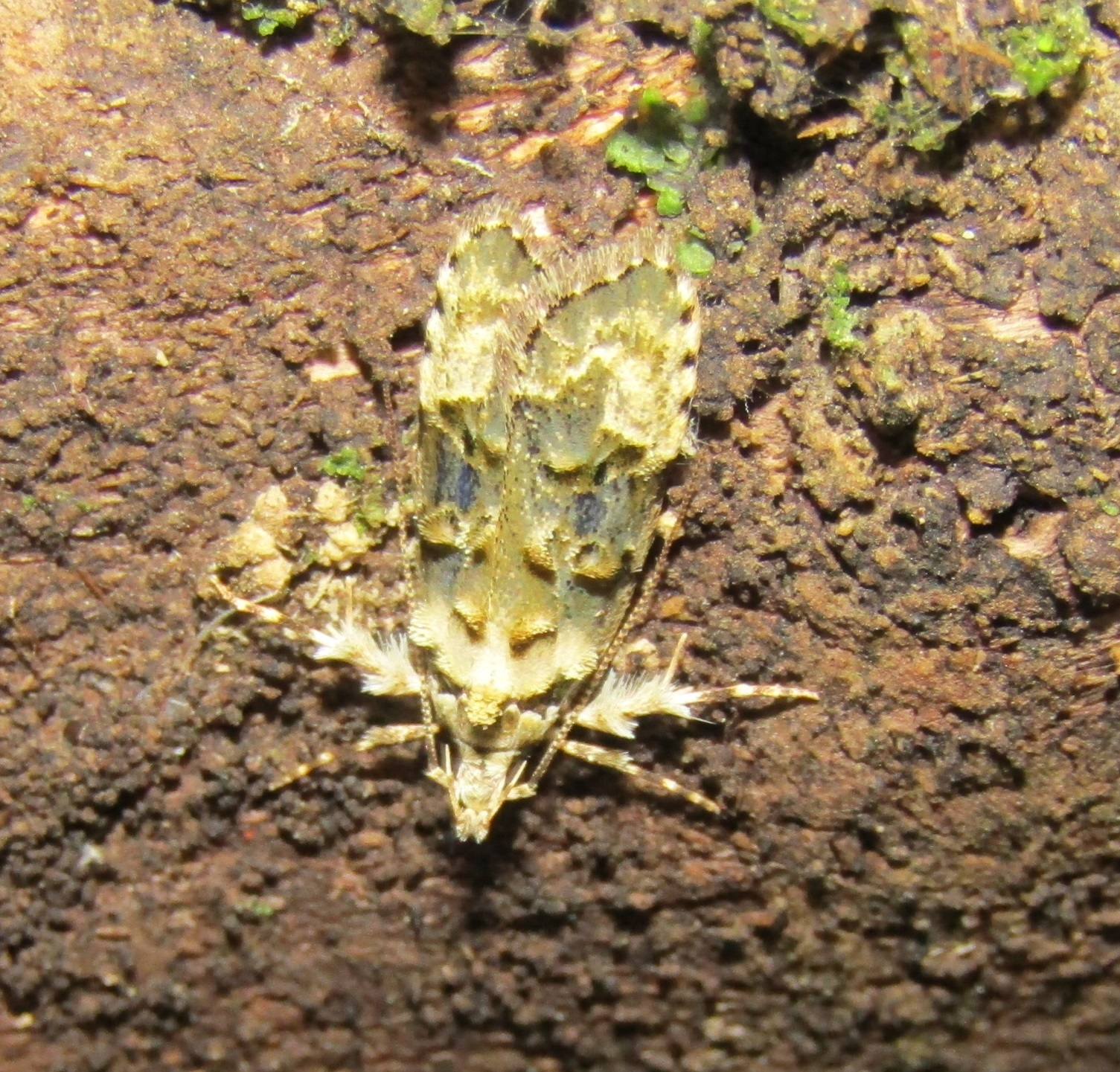

Scientific classification
- Kingdom: Animalia
- Phylum: Arthropoda
- Class: Insecta
- Order: Lepidoptera
- Family: Oecophoridae
- Genus: Izatha
- Species: I. prasophyta

Binomial name
- Izatha prasophyta (Meyrick, 1883)

Synonyms
- Semiocosma prasophyta Meyrick, 1883

= Izatha prasophyta =

Species of moth endemic to New Zealand

Izatha prasophyta is a moth of the family Oecophoridae. It is endemic to New Zealand, where it is known from the North Island, except Hawkes Bay or the Wairarapa. Larvae likely feed on rotting wood although larvae of this species have been reared on the fruiting body of the bracket fungus Bjerkandera adusta. Adults are on the wing from November to February.

== Taxonomy ==
This species was first described by Edward Meyrick in 1883 using two specimens collected at Taranaki and Wellington in January and February and named Semiocosma prasophyta. Meyrick gave a more detailed description of this species in 1884. In 1915 Meyrick placed this species in the genus Izatha. In 1928 George Hudson followed this placement and discussed and illustrated this species under the name Izatha prasophyta. This placement was confirmed in 1988 by J. S. Dugdale. Robert Hoare redescribed this species in 2010 and also confirmed this placement. The male lectotype, collected at the Wellington Botanic Garden, is held at the Natural History Museum, London.

== Description ==
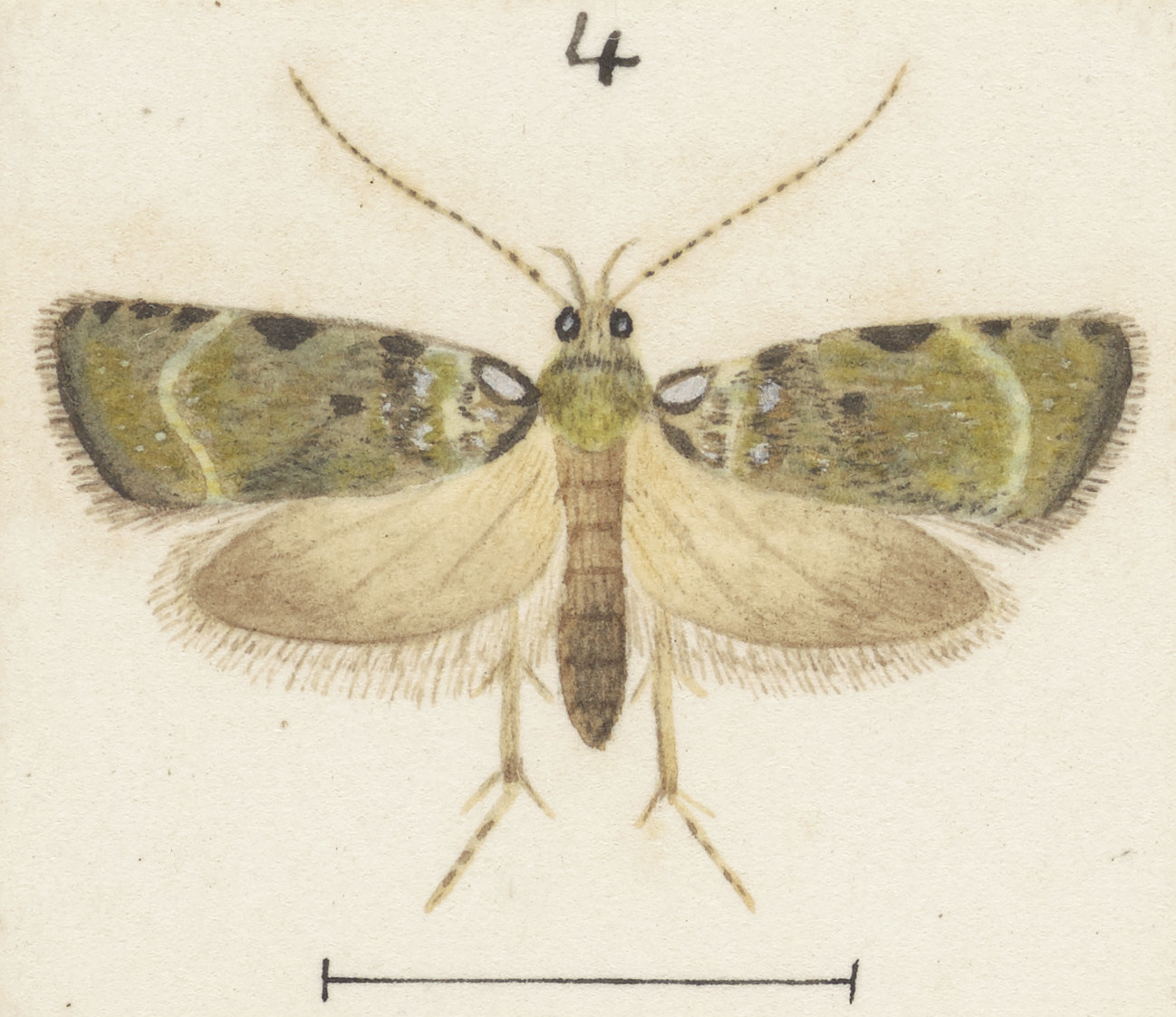
Illustration of I. prasophyta by George Hudson.

Meyrick described this species as follows:

Male, female. — 17-18 mm. Head white (?). Palpi white, second joint with a subbasal and subapical ring, terminal joint with a median ring black. Antennae grey-whitish, obscurely annulated with fuscous, basal joint whitish, with a fuscous subapical spot. Thorax whitish, anteriorly mixed with dull green and black. Abdomen grey-whitish. Anterior tibiae dark fuscous with central and apical whitish rings, middle tibiae dark fuscous broadly suffused with whitish towards centre and apex, posterior tibiae whitish, all tarsi dark fuscous with whitish rings at apex of joints. Forewings moderate, costa gently arched, sinuate in middle, apex obtuse, hindrnargin slightly sinuate, oblique; whitish, irrorated and partially suffused with dull ochreous-green, especially on central third and towards hindrnargin; extreme base and an irregular streak from costa near base to base of inner margin black; a small cloudy blackish spot on costa before middle, and another beyond middle; two tufts of green scales in disc before middle, followed by scattered black scales, and two tufts beyond middle, preceded and followed by black scales; a clear whitish sinuate transverse line from 3/4 of costa to before anal angle; three black dots on posterior third of costa, and an interrupted black hindmarginal line : cilia fuscous, with a cloudy blackish line. Hindwings grey, becoming whitish towards base cilia grey-whitish, with a cloudy grey line.

The wingspan is 16–22.5 mm for males and 19.5–26 mm for females. This species can be distinguished from Izatha peroneanella as it has olive-green coloured forewings that lack the longitudinal black markings of that species.

== Distribution ==
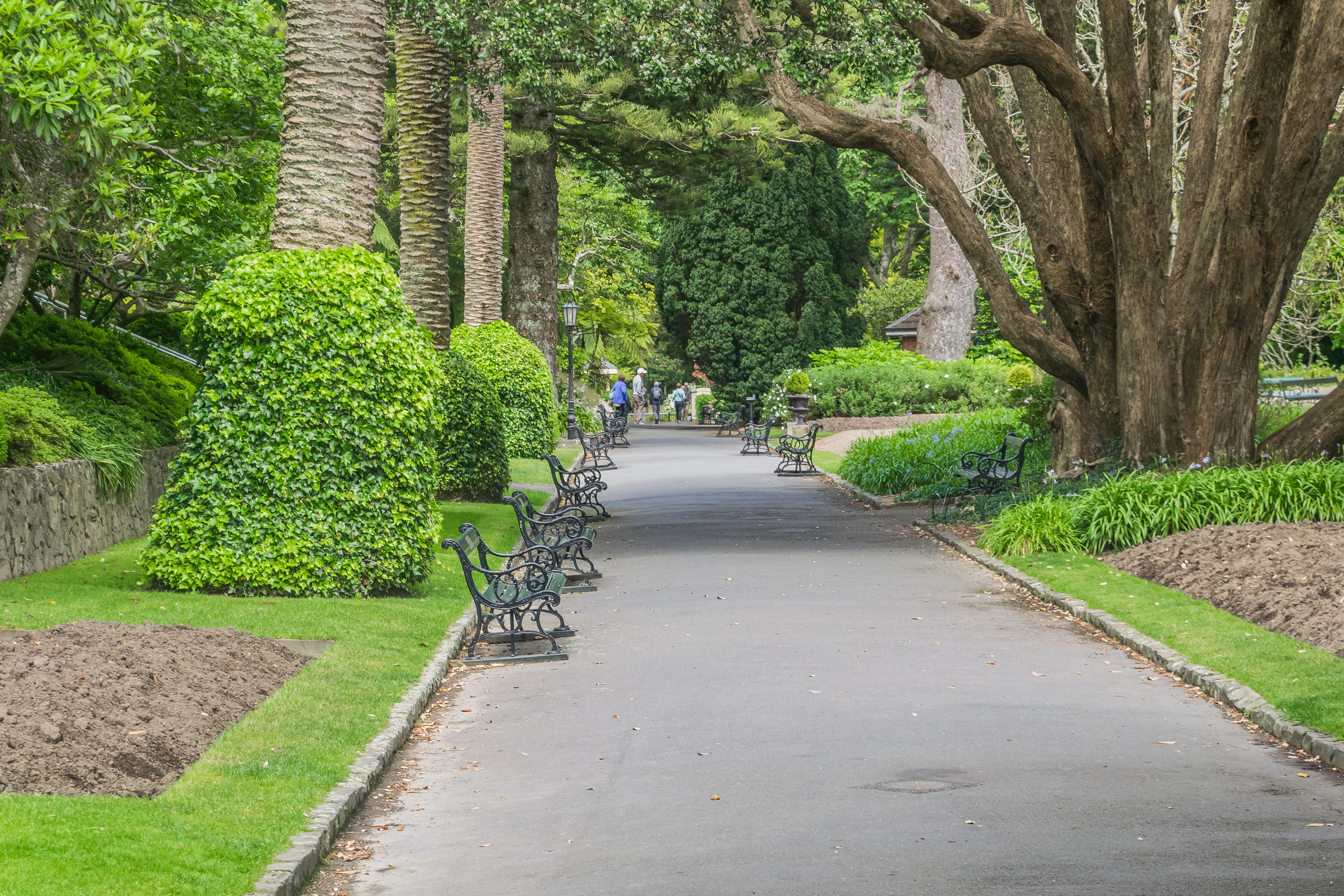
Wellington Botanical Garden, the type locality of this species.

This species is endemic to New Zealand and it is found throughout the North Island with the exception of the Hawkes Bay and the Wairarapa.

== Habitat and host species ==
This species inhabits native forest.

== Behaviour ==
Adults are on wing from November to February and are rarely attracted to light. When resting the adult holds its wing flat and slightly overlapping and its antennae close to its body. Its intermediate legs are heavily tufted and coloured pale. Extended at rest they break up the outline of the moth and enhance its cryptic colouring.
