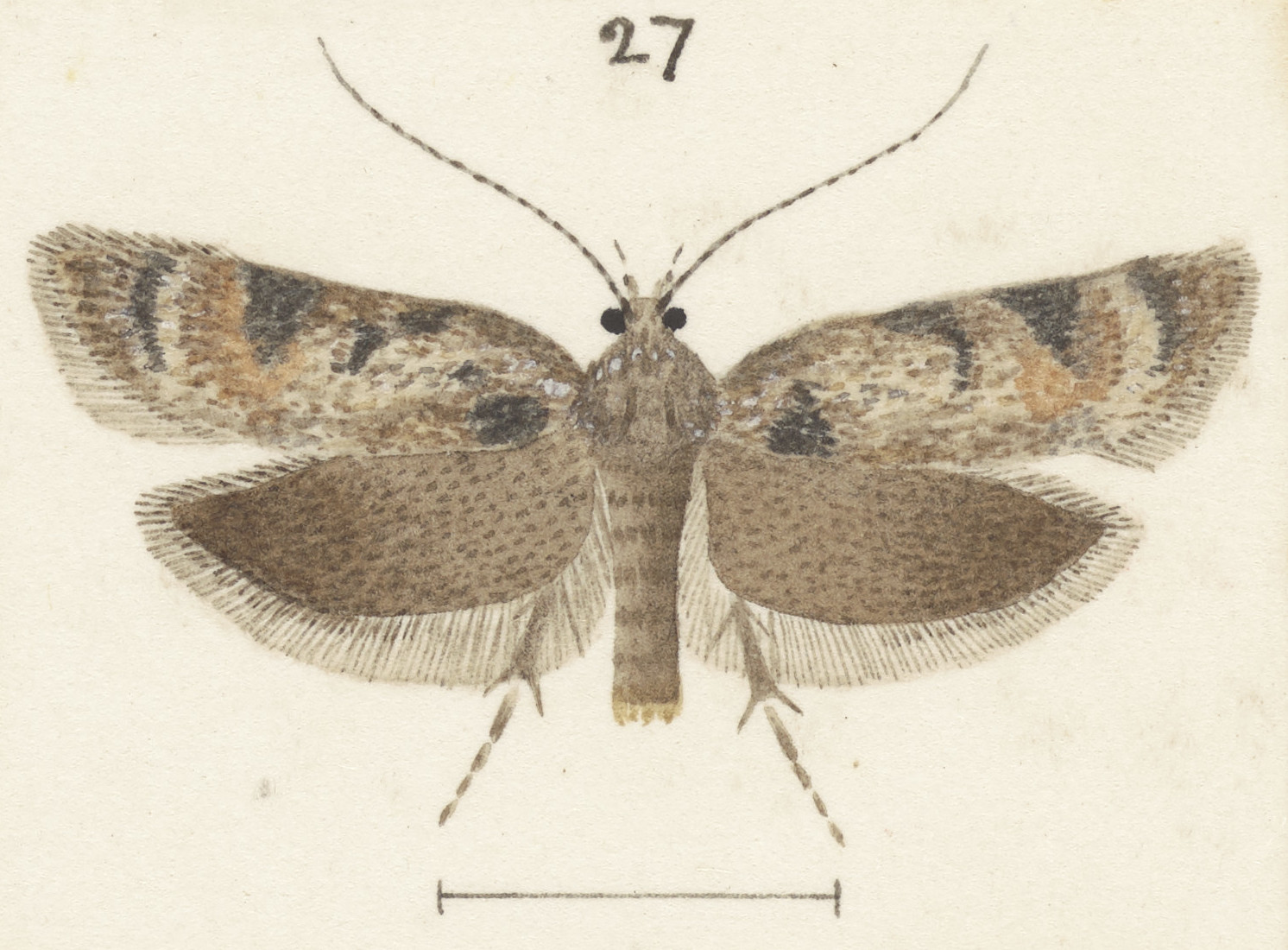

Scientific classification
- Kingdom: Animalia
- Phylum: Arthropoda
- Class: Insecta
- Order: Lepidoptera
- Family: Oecophoridae
- Genus: Izatha
- Species: I. phaeoptila

Binomial name
- Izatha phaeoptila (Meyrick, 1905)

Synonyms
- Trachypepla phaeoptila Meyrick, 1905

= Izatha phaeoptila =

Species of moth

Izatha phaeoptila is a moth of the family Oecophoridae. It is endemic to New Zealand, where it is known from the North Island.

The wingspan is 13–15 mm for males and 14–18.5 mm for females. Adults are on wing from January to early March.

The larvae have been recorded feeding on lichens growing on tree trunks. There is also a single reared specimen bred from moss.

== External reference ==
- Image via iNaturalist
