= Izatha taingo =

Scientific classification
- Kingdom: Animalia
- Phylum: Arthropoda
- Class: Insecta
- Order: Lepidoptera
- Family: Oecophoridae
- Genus: Izatha
- Species: I. taingo

Binomial name
- Izatha taingo Hoare, 2010

Species of moth

Izatha taingo (Māori name pepepepe tāingo o Ngāti Kuri) is a species of moth in the family Oecophoridae. It is endemic to New Zealand. This species is classified as "At Risk, Naturally Uncommon" by the Department of Conservation. It is only known from the Aupouri Peninsula of Northland.

== Taxonomy and etymology ==
This species was described by Robert J. B. Hoare in 2010. The epithet is based on the Māori word tāingo means "speckled" or "mottled" and refers to the forewing pattern. The holotype specimen is held at the New Zealand Arthropod Collection.

== Description ==
The wingspan is 18.5–22.5 mm for males and about 16 mm for females. I. taingo is normally white or pale whitish green in colour. This species is visually very similar to Izatha peroneanella. The only distinguishing feature between these two species is the difference in the male genitalia.

== Distribution ==
This species is endemic to New Zealand. It has only been found on the Aupouri Peninsular of Northland.

== Biology and behaviour ==
Adult moths have been recorded on the wing in October, November and December.

== Conservation status ==
This species has been classified as having the "At Risk, Naturally Uncommon" conservation status under the New Zealand Threat Classification System.
