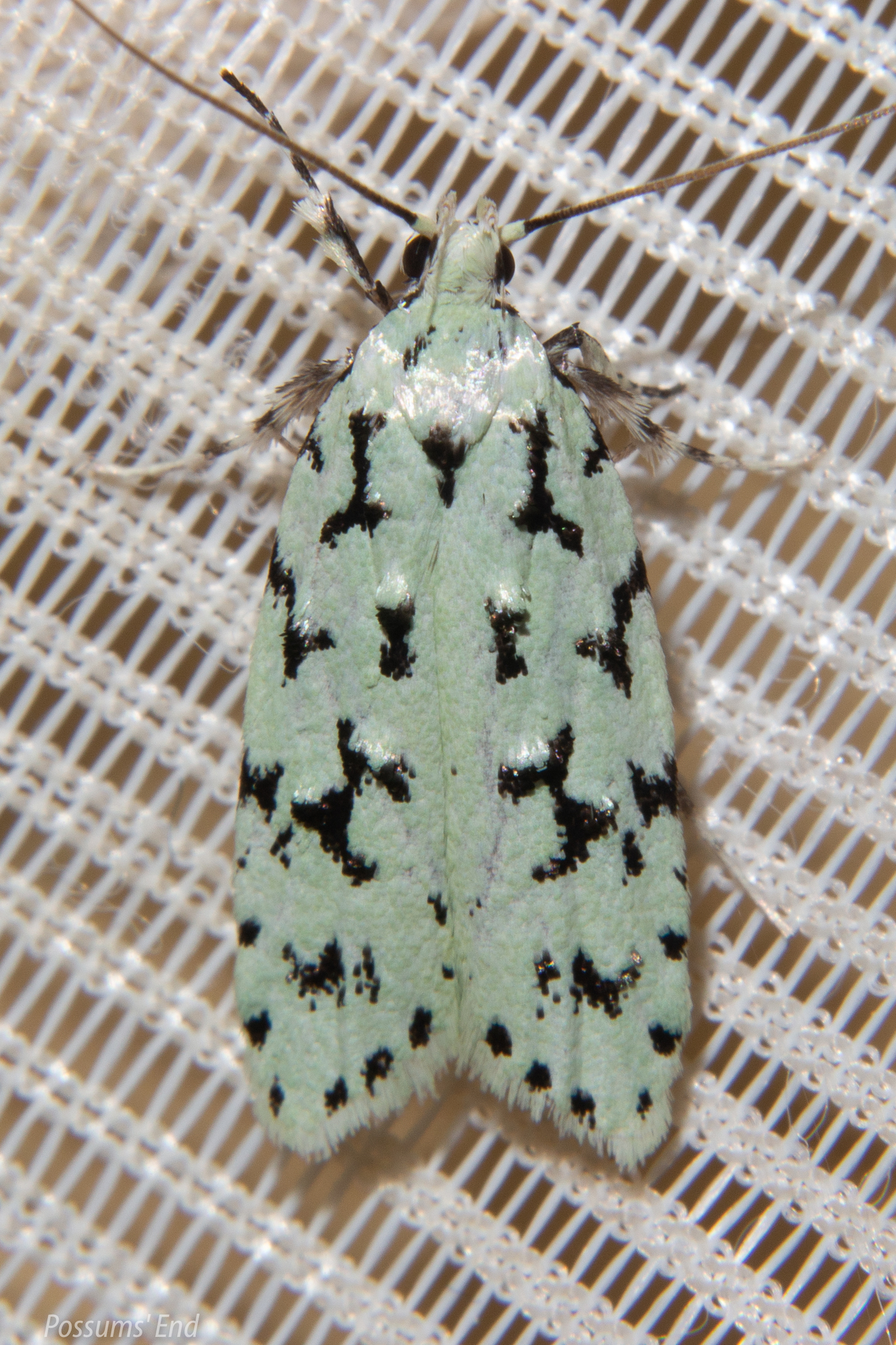

Scientific classification
- Kingdom: Animalia
- Phylum: Arthropoda
- Class: Insecta
- Order: Lepidoptera
- Family: Oecophoridae
- Genus: Izatha
- Species: I. huttonii

Binomial name
- Izatha huttonii (Butler, 1879)

Synonyms
- Oecophora huttonii Butler, 1879; Semiocosma mystis Meyrick, 1888; Izatha huttoni (Butler, 1879)

= Izatha huttonii =

Species of moth

Izatha huttonii is a moth of the family Oecophoridae. It is endemic to New Zealand, where it is known from the Wellington district of the North Island, the South Island, and Stewart Island. Although similar in appearance to related species I. huttonii can be distinguished as it has a distinctive M-shaped mark on its forewings. The larvae feed on the dead wood of makomako and karamu. Adult moths have been collected from October to March.

== Taxonomy ==
This species was first described by Arthur Gardiner Butler in 1879 using a female specimen obtained in Otago by Frederick Hutton and named Oecophora huttonii. In 1888 I. huttonii was synonymised by Edward Meyrick with Izatha peroneanella. However 2014 Robert J. B. Hoare removed I. huttonii from synonymy with I. peroneanella and reinstated it as a species. The holotype specimen is held at the Natural History Museum, London.

== Description ==
Butler originally described the species as follows:

Allied to O. picarclla; primaries above greyish-white; a short bifurcate black line lying along the base of costal margin, a, Y-shaped black marking at base of median vein, and beyond it an oblong spot, above the latter a zigzag line running to the costal margin; an irregularly zigzag black line from the centre of costal margin to the first median branch; a ?-shaped black character on the disc, and a series of black spots round the margin of the wings, from the costa just behind the middle to the inner margin near external angle; secondaries shining-grey, with darker subconfluent marginal spots; apical half of fringe sordid white, intersected by a grey line; body white; wings below shining brown, with whitish margins and white fringes; body below white, the venter with black lateral patches; legs white externally with the tarsi black-banded, anterior pair black internally with white joints. Expanse of wings 1 inch 1 line.

I. huttonii has long been confused with I. peroneanella. The differences between these species are variable and subtle. The most obvious visual distinguishing feature of I. huttonii is its forewing discal "M" mark. This mark is complete in I. huttonii where as with I. peroneanella it usually broken beyond the first stroke. In general, although both species are variable in colouration, I. huttonii tends to be a paler green and I. peroneanella is usually a brighter lime green.

This species is polymorphic and comes in green and white shades. The green colouration can turn yellowish if the moth is wet.

A description of larvae has yet to be positively associated with this species.

== Distribution ==
This species is endemic to New Zealand. It is found in the south of the North Island only around Wellington, is widespread in the South Island and is the only Izatha species found on Stewart Island. I. huttonii is more common in Wellington that the similar species I. peroneanella.

== Biology and behaviour ==
Adults are on wing from November to March though one specimen has been captured in October.

== Habitat and host species ==
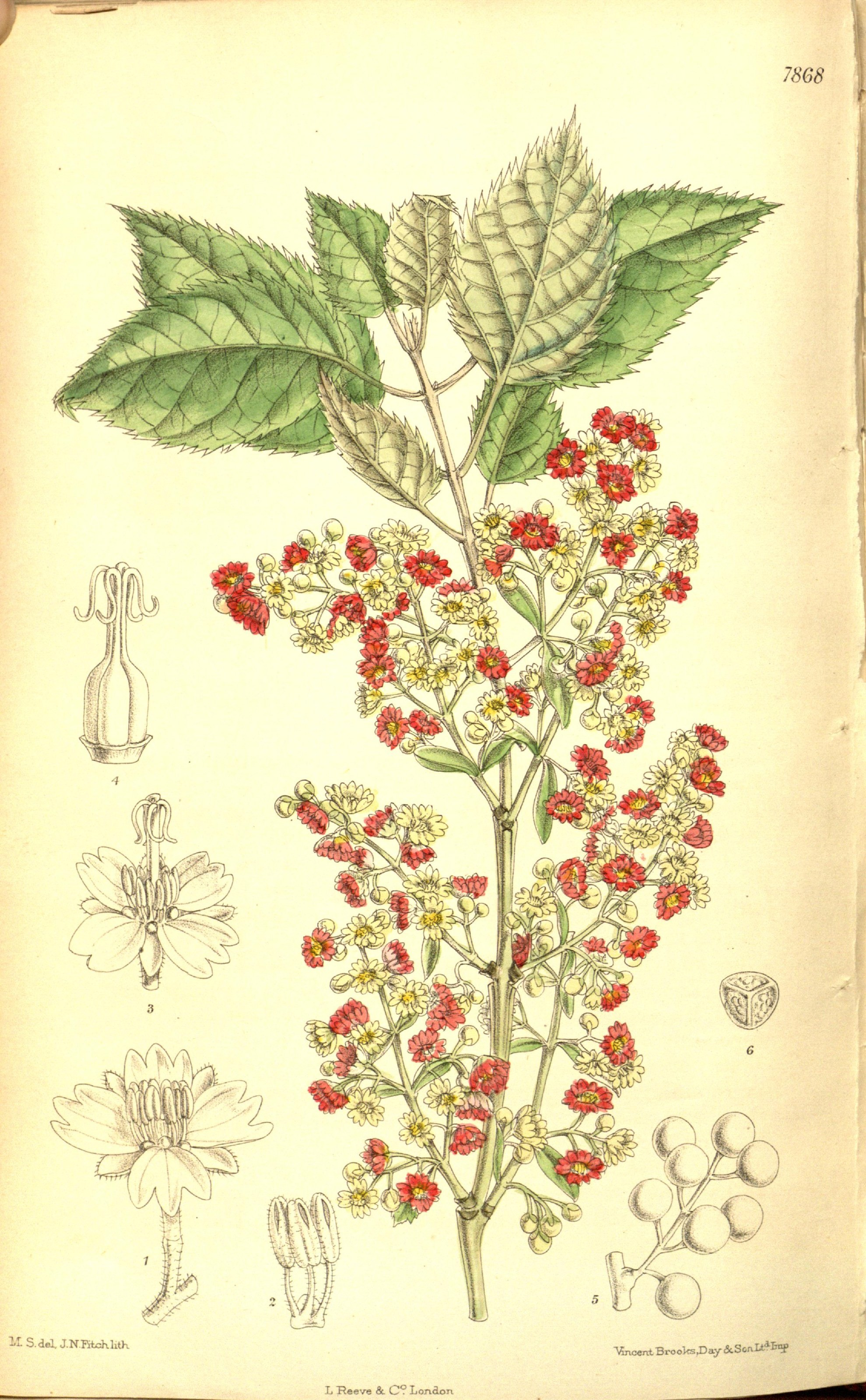
Aristotelia serrata

Larvae have been recorded feeding on dead branches of Aristotelia serrata and has been reared from Coprosma robusta.
