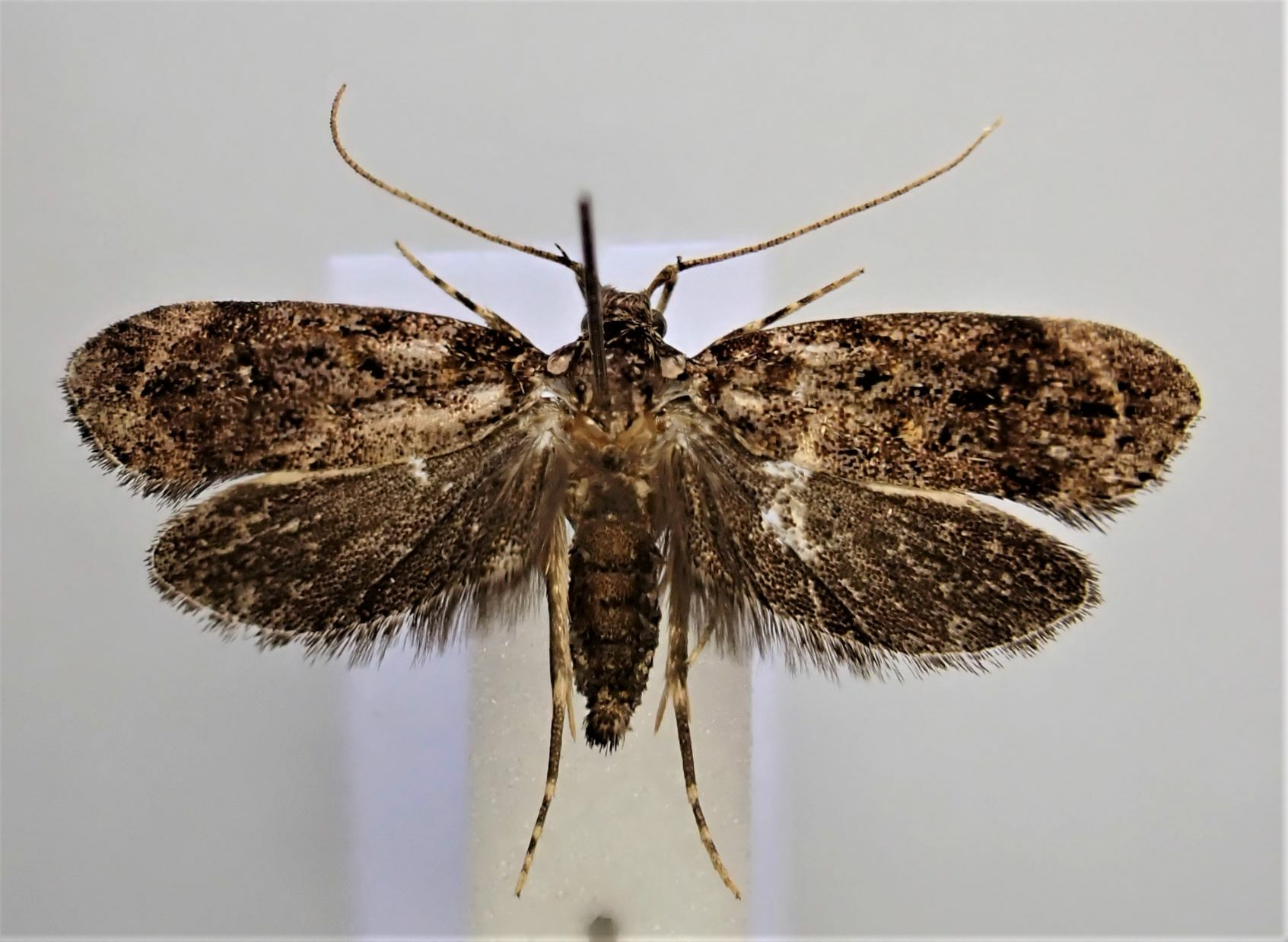
- Izatha dasydisca found on the Coromandel Peninsula, New Zealand

Scientific classification
- Kingdom: Animalia
- Phylum: Arthropoda
- Class: Insecta
- Order: Lepidoptera
- Family: Oecophoridae
- Genus: Izatha
- Species: I. dasydisca

Binomial name
- Izatha dasydisca Hoare, 2010

= Izatha dasydisca =

Species of moth

Izatha dasydisca is a species of moth in the family Oecophoridae. It is endemic to New Zealand. This species is classified as "At Risk, Naturally Uncommon" by the Department of Conservation.

== Taxonomy and etymology ==
This species was first described by Robert J. B. Hoare in 2010 from a specimen collected by John S. Dugdale at Mount Auckland in Auckland and named Izatha dasydisca.

== Description ==
The wingspan is 15–19 mm for males and about 26 mm for females. I. dasydisca is visually very similar to I. austera. However the male I. dasydisca can be distinguished by its mottled pale orange to reddish brown antennae. I. dasydisca also has large forewing scale-tufts and its hindwing shape is smoothly rounded. I. dasydisca has very dark hindwings which helps distinguish it from its near relative I. caustopa.

== Distribution ==
This species is endemic to New Zealand, where it is only known from the northern half of the North Island in the Northland, Auckland and Gisborne areas.

== Biology and behaviour ==
The larvae have yet to be discovered. Adults have been recorded on the wing in December, January and February. The species has been collected by sweeping and by capturing when at rest on a tree trunk. It appears this species is not attracted to light traps.

== Hosts and habitat ==
The host species of the larvae of I. dasydisca are unknown. The adults of the species apparently prefers forest habitat as specimens have been collected in beech as well as podocarp forest.

== Conservation status ==
This species has been classified as having the "At Risk, Naturally Uncommon" conservation status under the New Zealand Threat Classification System.
