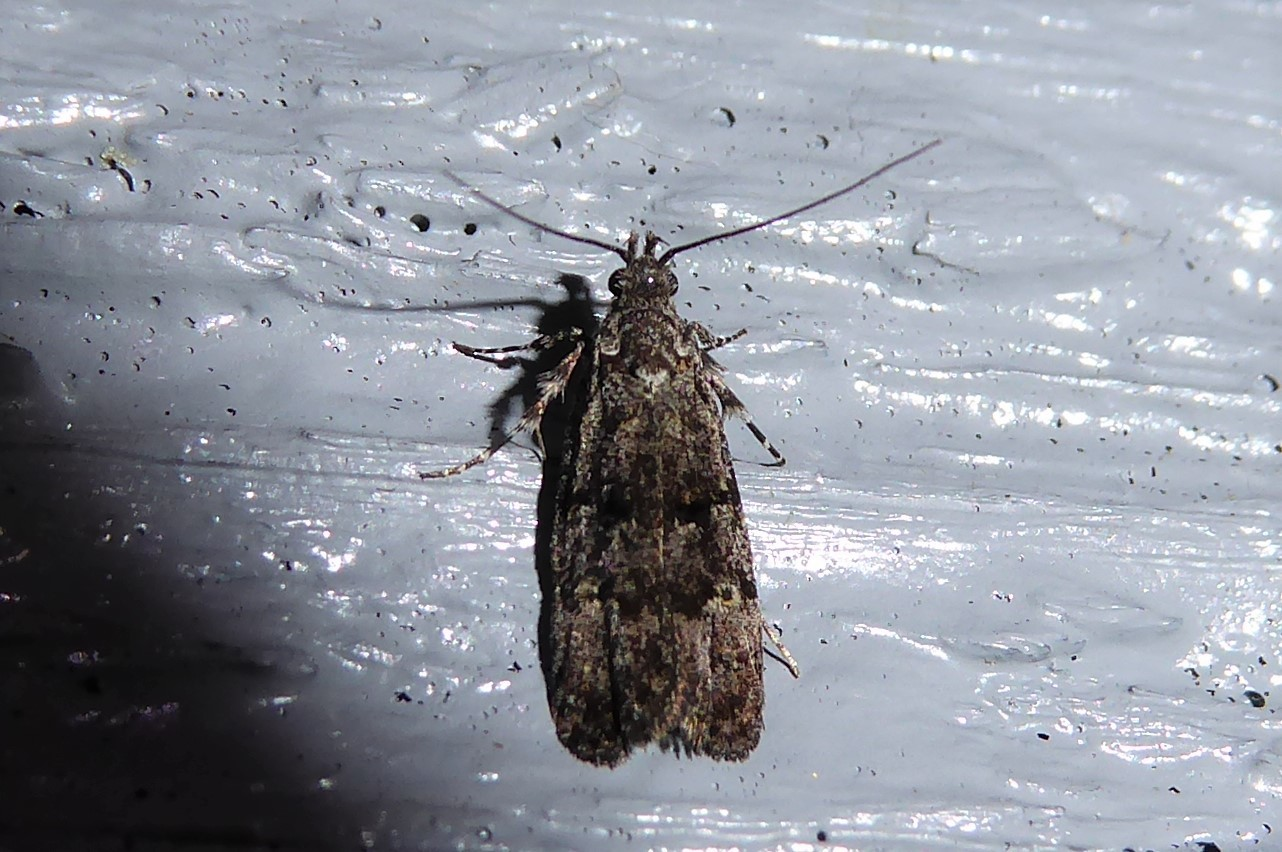

Scientific classification
- Kingdom: Animalia
- Phylum: Arthropoda
- Class: Insecta
- Order: Lepidoptera
- Family: Oecophoridae
- Genus: Izatha
- Species: I. copiosella

Binomial name
- Izatha copiosella (Walker, 1864)

Synonyms
- Gelechia copiosella Walker, 1864; Zirosaris amorbas Meyrick, 1910; Trachypepla amorbas Meyrick, 1911; Izatha amorbas (Meyrick, 1910)

= Izatha copiosella =

Species of moth

Izatha copiosella is a moth of the family Oecophoridae. It is endemic to New Zealand, where it is found on the south-eastern parts of the North Island and throughout the South Island except the West Coast. Larvae are found in dead wood and are likely to use kōwhai species as hosts. The adults are night fliers and are attracted to light. They are on the wing in January and February.

== Taxonomy ==
This species was first described by Francis Walker in 1864 using specimens obtained from T. R. Oxley at Nelson and named Gelechia copiosella. The type specimen is held at the Natural History Museum, London. Walker failed to recognise that this species fell within his newly described genus Izatha. In 1928 George Hudson misidentified and described the species now named Izatha voluptuosa as I. copiosella. Hudson did however illustrate I. copiosella as well as the species now known as I. voluptuosa in that 1928 publication. This misidentification was rectified by J. S. Dugdale in 1988 and Dugdale's conclusions were supported by Robert J. B. Hoare in 2010. In 1910 Edward Meyrick, thinking he was describing a new species, erected the genus Zirosaris to include Zirosaris amorbas. Meyrick went on to describe I. copiosella again in 1911 and named it Trachypepla amorbas. In 1915 Meyrick synonymised Zirosaris with Trachypepla. Trachypepla amorbas was in turn synonymized with I. copiosella in 2010.

== Description ==
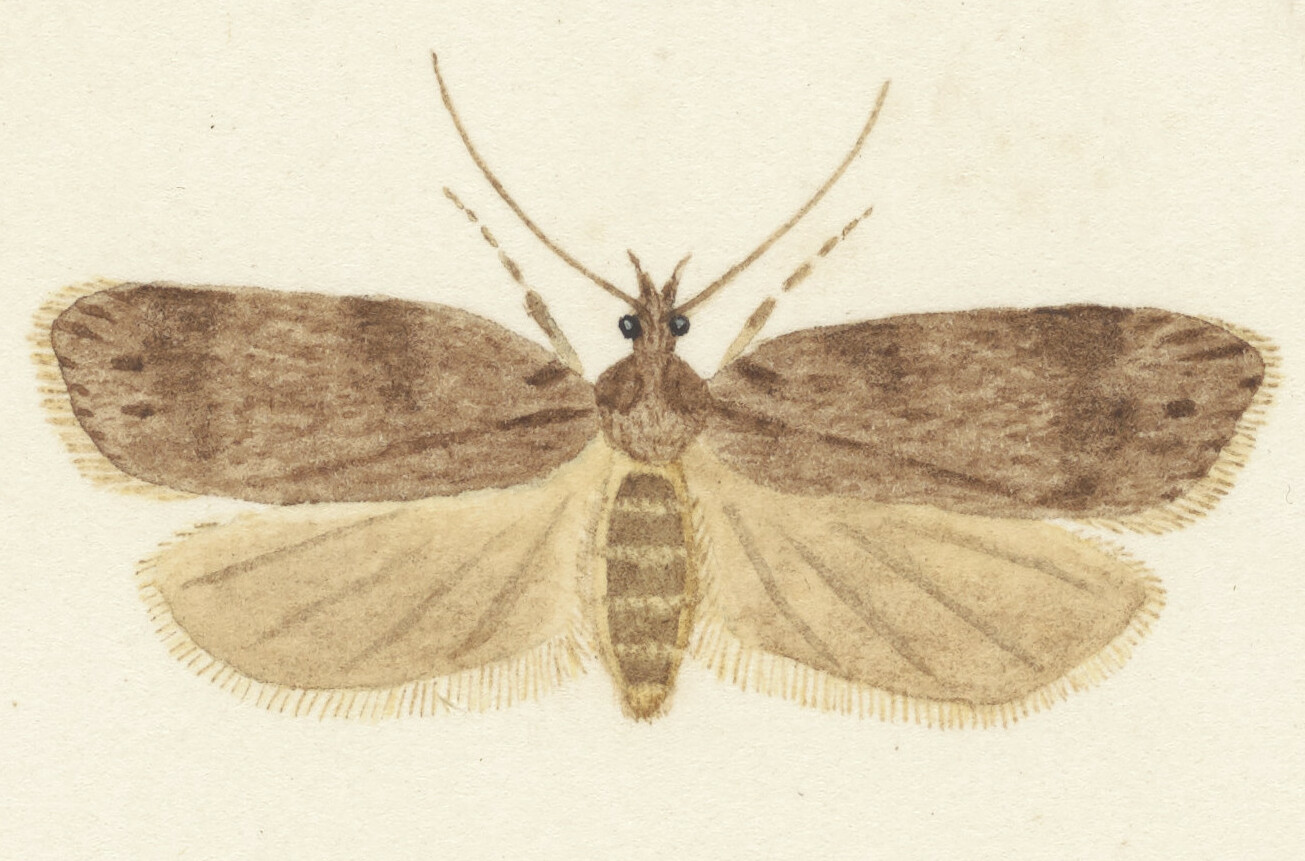
Watercolour by George Hudson c. 1927

The egg of I. copiosella is oblong and is coloured a pink tinged white when first laid.

Walker described the adults of the species as follows:

Male. Blackish, dark cinereous beneath. Palpi nearly twice longer than the breadth of the head; second joint thickly fringed beneath; third setiform, much shorter than the second, with two minute black tufts, one at the base, the other in the middle. Antennae rather stout, much shorter than the fore wings. Abdomen long, slightly tapering; hind borders of the segments cinereous; apical tuft long. Legs rather long; tips of the tarsal joints pale cinereous. Fore wings moderately broad, slightly acute, clouded and streaked with cinereous; marginal line cinereous; exterior border slightly convex, moderately oblique. Hind wings dark aeneous. Length of the body 4 1/2 lines; of the wings 10 lines.

The wingspan of the adult moth is 15–20 mm for males and 19–23 mm for females. I. copiosella can be distinguished from similar species in the genus by a length of yellow scales only found in the front half of the hind wing.

== Distribution ==
This species is endemic to New Zealand. It is restricted to the south eastern part of the North Island from Hawkes Bay and then all of the South Island to Invercargill. I. copiosella has been collected in the Hawkes Bay, Wairarapa, Wellington, Marlborough Sounds, Nelson, Buller, Kaikoura, North and Mid Canterbury, Otago Lakes, Central Otago, Dunedin, Southland and Fiordland areas.

== Behaviour and life cycle ==
This species is night flying and appear to be attracted to light. Adults are on wing from January to February. The species is not regarded as being abundant and very few females have been collected.

== Habitat and host species ==
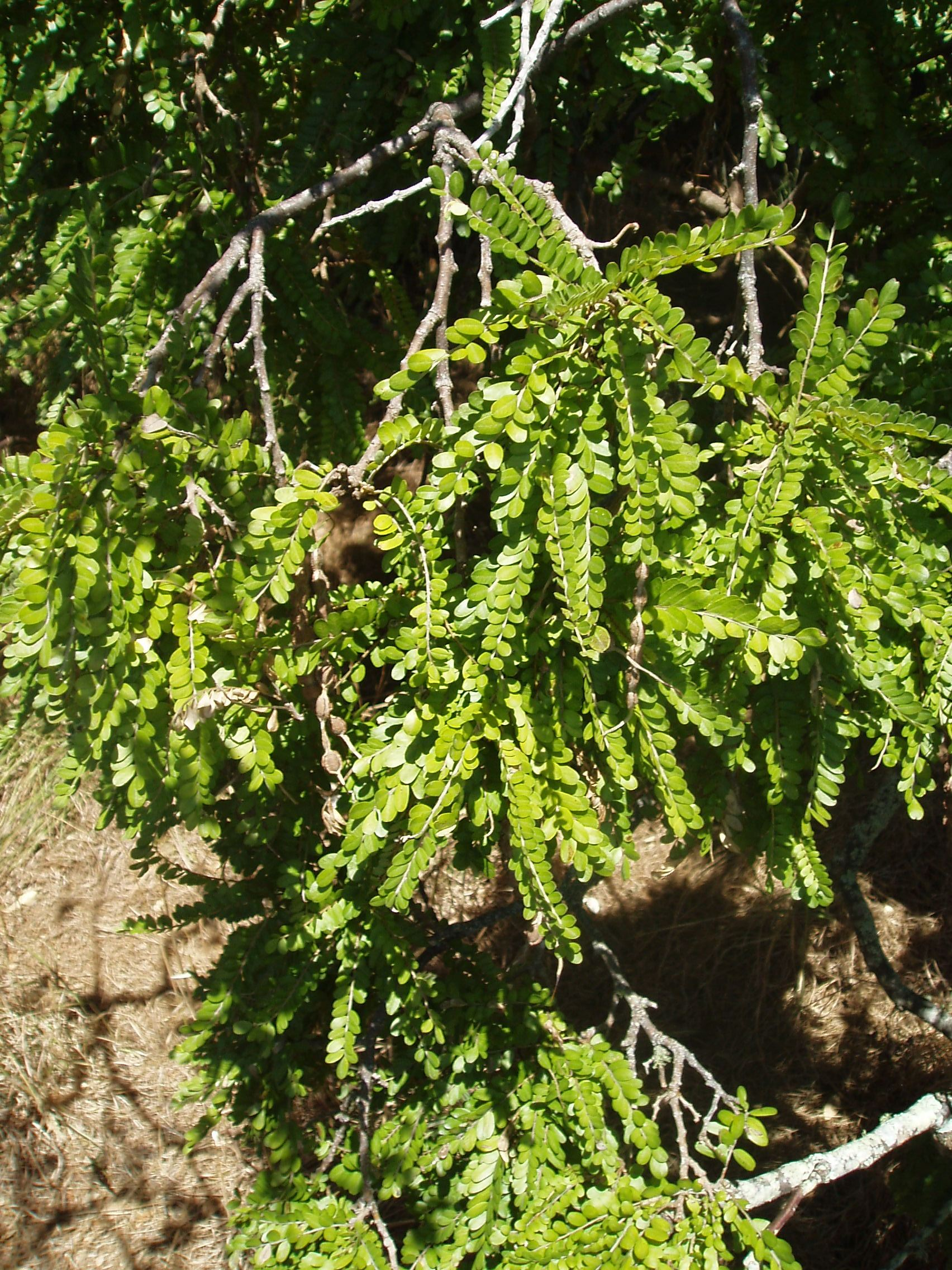
Sophora chathamica

Larvae have been found in dead elm wood (Ulmus species). They probably also feed on dead wood of Sophora species.
