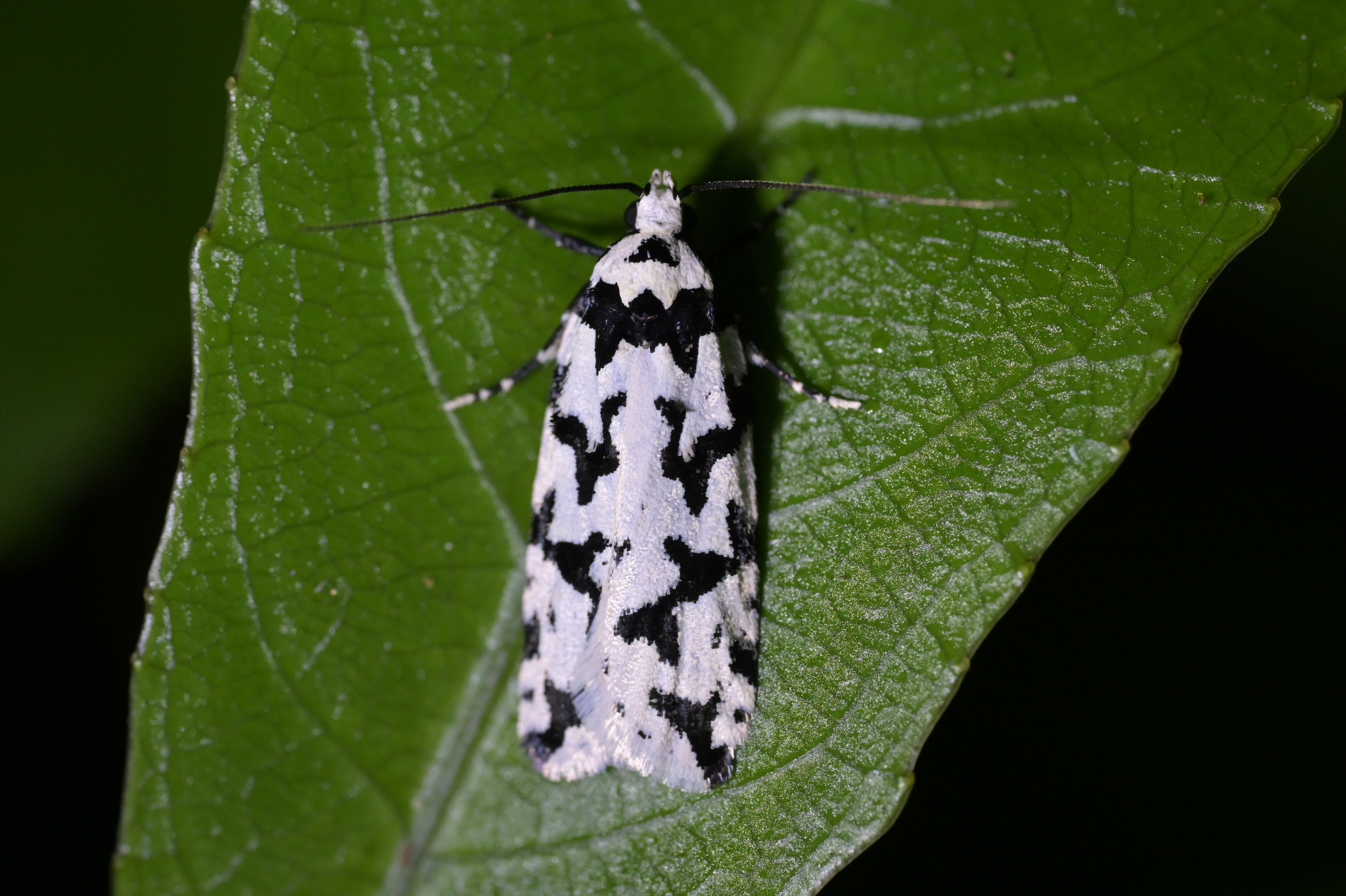
- Moth observed at Alfredton Domain, Mastodon

Scientific classification
- Kingdom: Animalia
- Phylum: Arthropoda
- Class: Insecta
- Order: Lepidoptera
- Family: Oecophoridae
- Genus: Izatha
- Species: I. lignyarcha

Binomial name
- Izatha lignyarcha Hoare, 2010

= Izatha lignyarcha =

Species of moth endemic to New Zealand

Izatha lignyarcha is a moth of the family Oecophoridae. This species was first described in 2010. It is endemic to New Zealand.

== Taxonomy ==
This species was first described by Robert Hoare in 2010. The holotype specimen, collected at the Stratford Plateau at Mount Taranaki, is held at Te Papa.

== Description ==
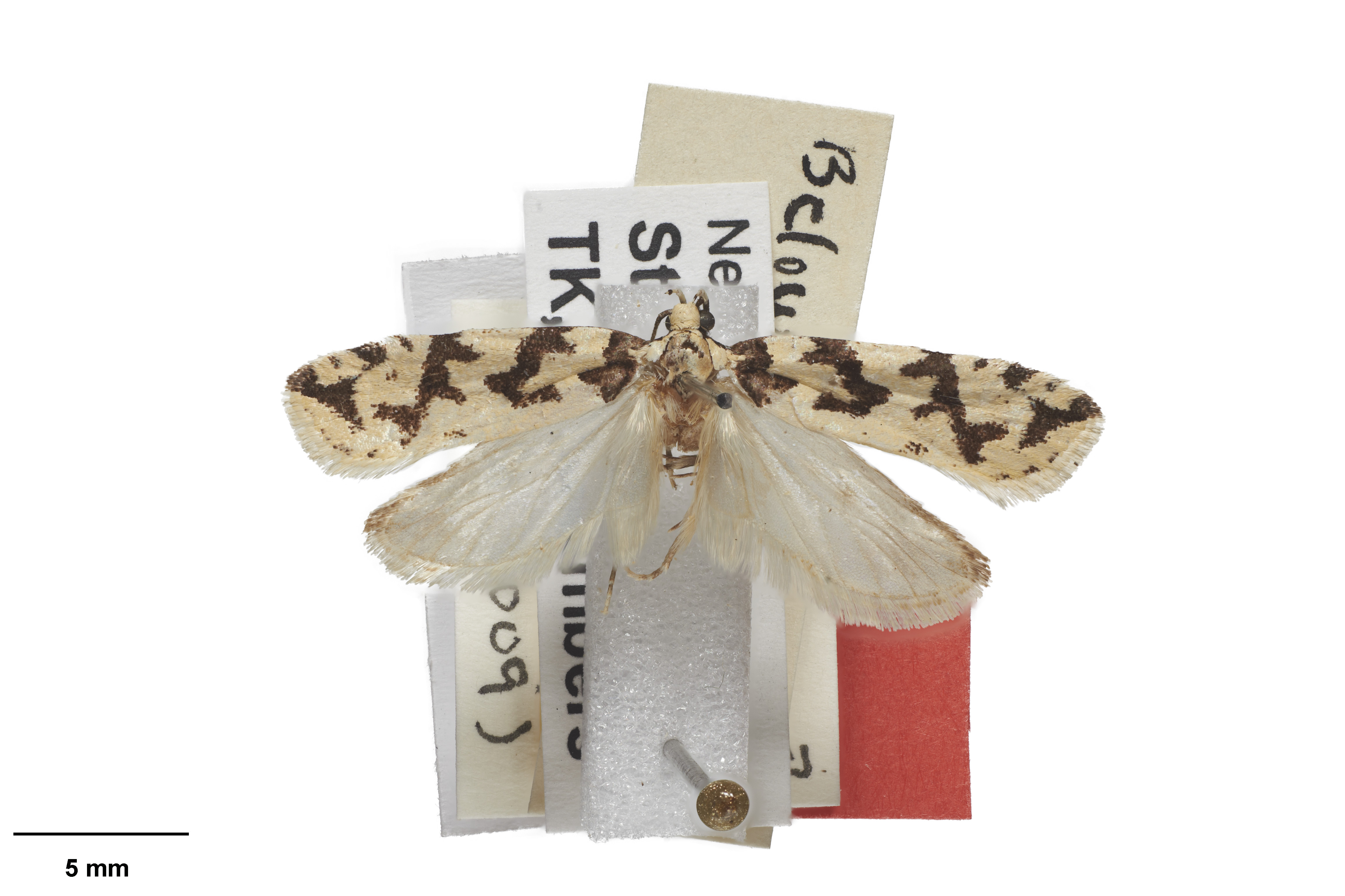
Holotype specimen.

The wingspan is 24.5–30 mm for males and 24–31 mm for females.

== Distribution ==
This species has been collected at higher altitudes on the North Island volcanoes (Mount Taranaki and Mount Ruapehu), as well as in Taupō and Masterton.

== Behaviour ==
Adults have been recorded on the wing from October to February.
