= Izatha haumu =

Conservation status
- Naturally Uncommon (NZ TCS)

Scientific classification
- Kingdom: Animalia
- Phylum: Arthropoda
- Class: Insecta
- Order: Lepidoptera
- Family: Oecophoridae
- Genus: Izatha
- Species: I. haumu

Binomial name
- Izatha haumu Hoare, 2010

Species of moth

Izatha haumu (Māori name pepepepe haumu o Ngāti Kuri) is a species of moth in the family Oecophoridae. It is endemic to New Zealand. This species is classified as "At Risk, Naturally Uncommon" by the Department of Conservation. It is believed to only inhabit the Aupouri Peninsula.

== Taxonomy and etymology ==
This species was described by Robert J. B. Hoare in 2010 and named Izatha haumu. The Māori word haumu means "hairy" and refers to the grizzled appearance of the moth. The holotype specimen is held at the New Zealand Arthropod Collection.

== Description ==
The wingspan is 18–22 mm for males and about 23 mm for females. This species is very similar in appearance to I. mesoschista and it is likely the two species can only be distinguished by an examination of male genitalia.

== Distribution ==
It is endemic to New Zealand, where it is known from the Aupouri Peninsula of Northland. I. haumu is believed to be endemic to Aupouri Peninsula.

== Biology and behaviour ==
Very little is known of the biology of this species but adults have been recorded on the wing in October and November. The larvae of I. haumu has yet to be located.

== Conservation status ==
This species has been classified as having the "At Risk, Naturally Uncommon" conservation status under the New Zealand Threat Classification System.
