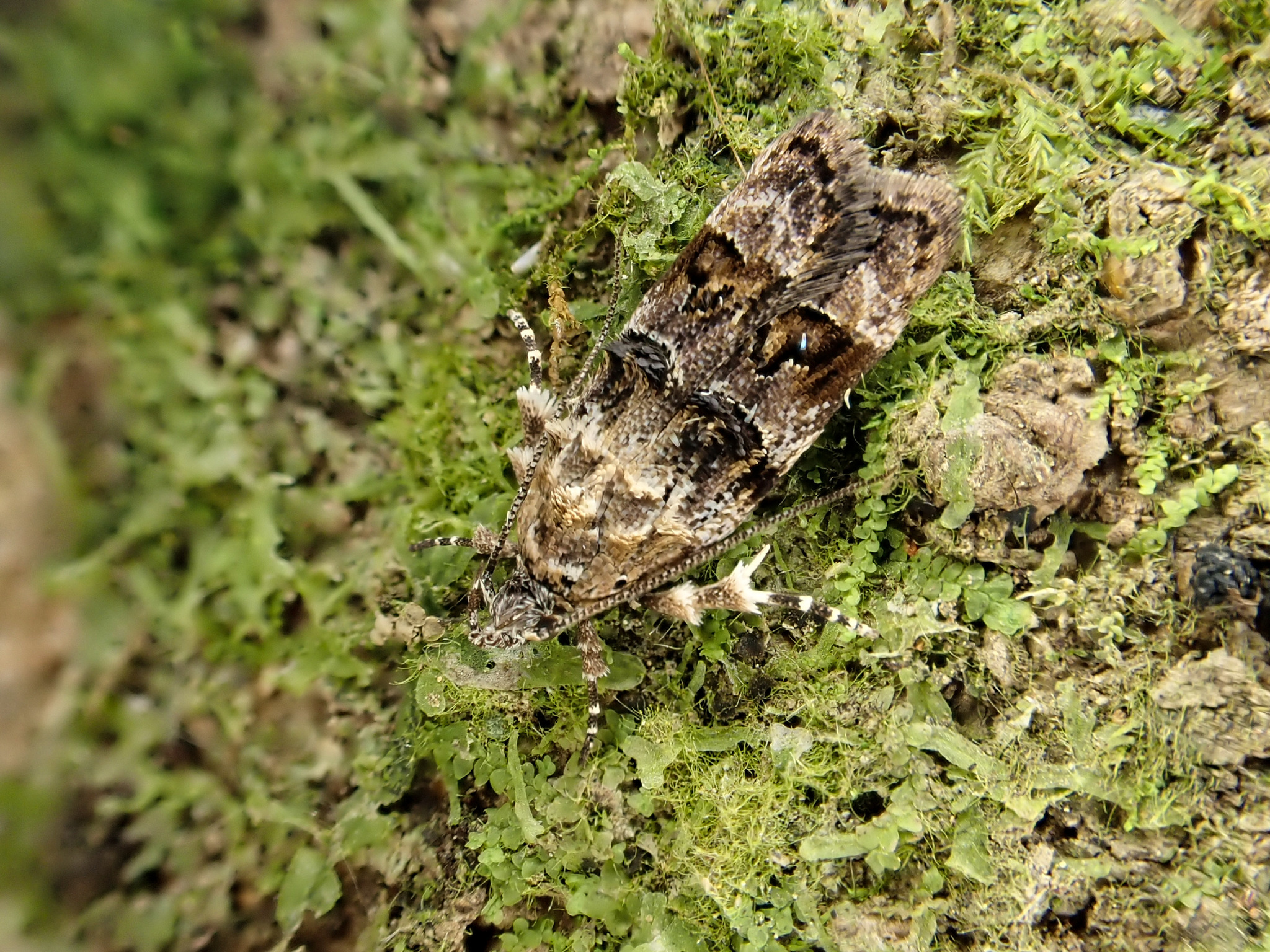

Scientific classification
- Kingdom: Animalia
- Phylum: Arthropoda
- Class: Insecta
- Order: Lepidoptera
- Family: Oecophoridae
- Genus: Izatha
- Species: I. metadelta

Binomial name
- Izatha metadelta Meyrick, 1905

Synonyms
- Izatha percnitis Meyrick, 1909

= Izatha metadelta =

Species of moth

Izatha metadelta is a moth of the family Oecophoridae. It is endemic to New Zealand, where it is known from the North Island only. It is rare north of Waikato and the Bay of Plenty.

== Taxonomy ==
This species was first described by Edward Meyrick in 1905 using three specimens collected in Wellington by George Hudson. The lectotype specimen is held at the Natural History Museum, London. Hudson discussed and illustrated this species in his 1928 publication The Butterflies and Moths of New Zealand.

== Description ==
The wingspan is 15–18.5 mm for males and 19–25.5 mm for females. Meyrick first described this species as follows:

♂. 17 mm, ♀. 19-25 mm. Head fuscous sprinkled with whitish, with well-marked conical horny frontal prominence concealed in scales. Palpi white, second joint mixed with dark fuscous, with dark fuscous basal and subapical bands, terminal joint mixed with dark fuscous at base, with dark fuscous median band. Antennae dark fuscous ringed with whitish. Thorax whitish, mixed with fuscous in ♂, on patagia ochreous-tinged, anteriorly suffused with dark fuscous. Abdomen dark fuscous mixed with whitish, two basal segments ferruginous-ochreous. Fore-wings elongate, moderate, costa gently arched, apex obtuse, termen straight, rather oblique, rounded beneath; brownish -ochreous or fuscous, more or less sprinkled with whitish and dark fuscous, darkest in ♂, towards costa and dorsum suffused with whitish in ♀; dark fuscous marks at base of costa and dorsum; a small fuscous spot on costa at 1/6, and a larger triangular one on dorsum at 1/3, latter followed in ♀ by a patch of ochreous suffusion; a dark fuscous subquadrate spot on costa before middle, and a larger subtriangular one extending on costa from middle to 3/4; two dark fuscous transverse discal spots before and beyond middle, touching these costal spots respectively, partially edged with black and then with white, first suboval, mostly filled with raised scales, second curved -reniform, lower posterior margin broadly interrupted; in ♂ two undefined longitudinal discal black- ish streaks traversing these spots; an ill-defined cloudy whitish curved subterminal line; a terminal series of small dark fuscous spots: cilia fuscous sprinkled with whitish. Hind-wings in ♂ blackish-fuscous, in ♀ dark fuscous, lighter anteriorly; cilia fuscous, with darker basal shade.

Adults have been recorded in December, January and February.
