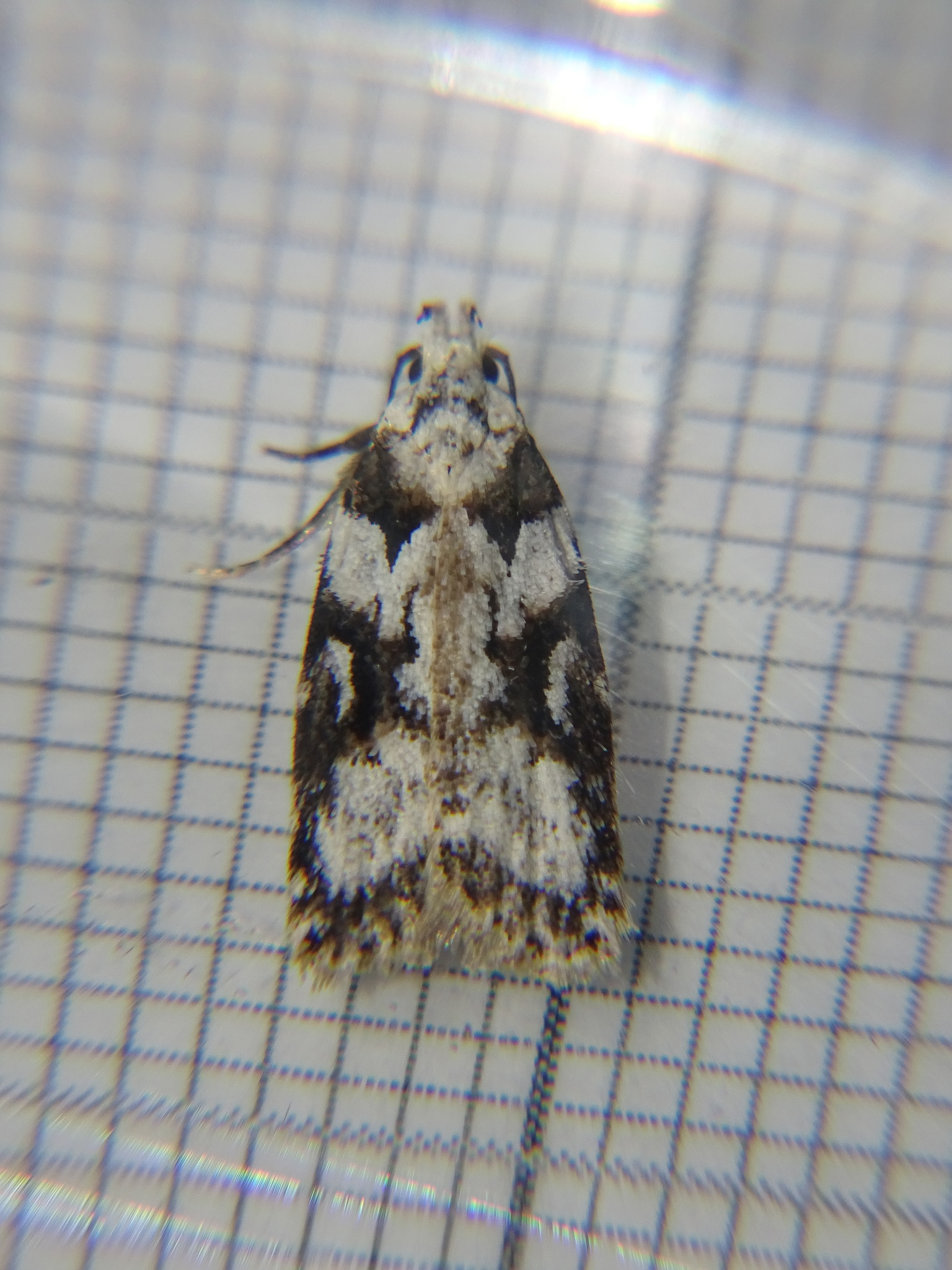

Scientific classification
- Kingdom: Animalia
- Phylum: Arthropoda
- Class: Insecta
- Order: Lepidoptera
- Superfamily: Gelechioidea
- Family: Oecophoridae
- Subfamily: Oecophorinae
- Genus: Izatha
- Species: I. epiphanes

Binomial name
- Izatha epiphanes (Meyrick, 1884)

Synonyms
- Semiocosma epiphanes Meyrick, 1884

= Izatha epiphanes =

Species of moth

Izatha epiphanes is a moth of the family Oecophoridae. It is endemic to New Zealand, where it is widespread throughout the North Island.

The wingspan is 17–25 mm for males and 18.5–28 mm for females. Adults are on wing from late October to February.

Larvae have been reared from dead wood of Pittosporum tenuifolium and Fuchsia excorticata and dead standing wood of a Coprosma species (probably Coprosma grandifolia).
