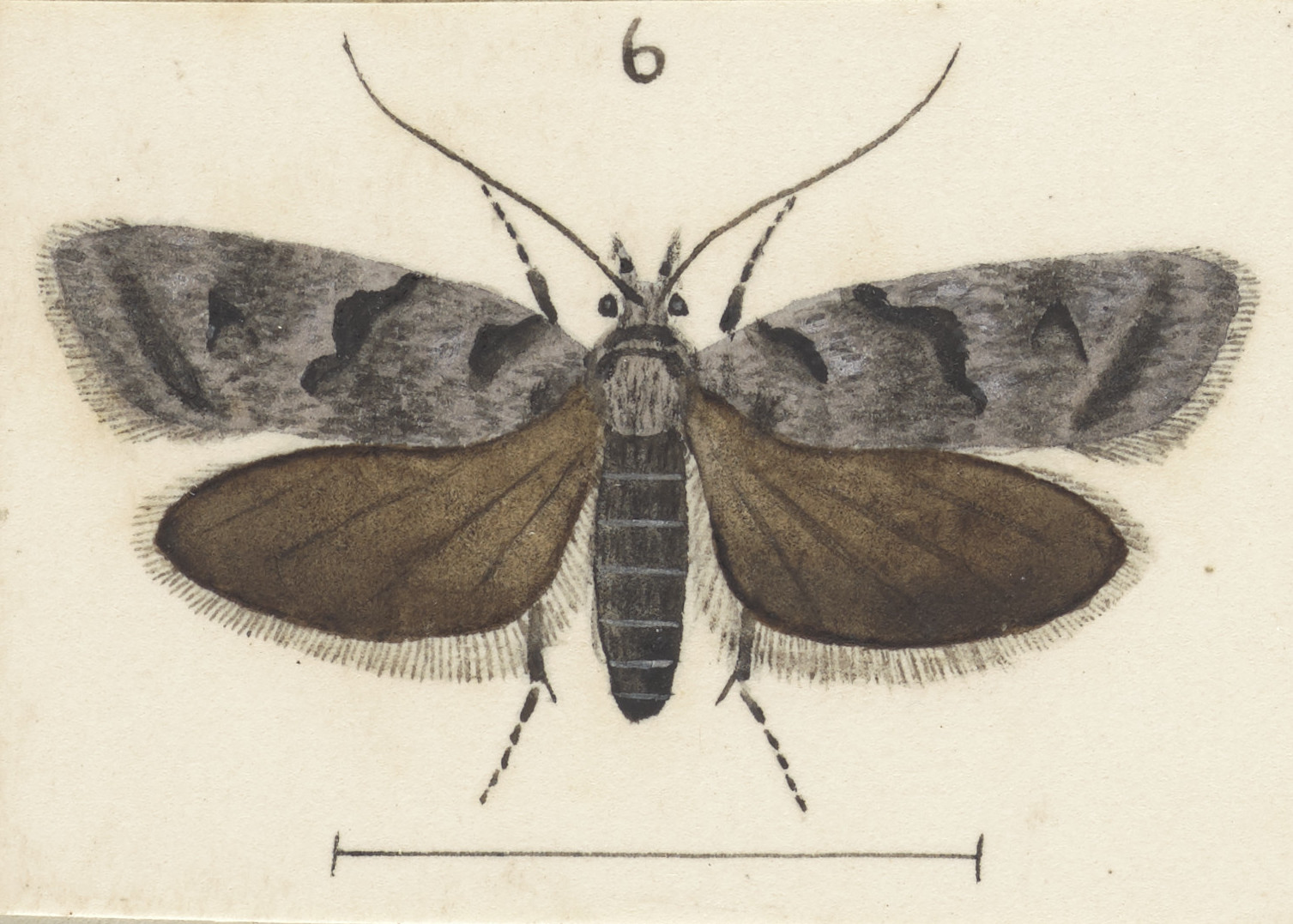

Conservation status
- Data Deficit (NZ TCS)

Scientific classification
- Kingdom: Animalia
- Phylum: Arthropoda
- Clade: Pancrustacea
- Class: Insecta
- Order: Lepidoptera
- Family: Oecophoridae
- Genus: Izatha
- Species: I. mira

Binomial name
- Izatha mira Philpott, 1913

Synonyms
- Izatha plumbosa Philpott, 1927

= Izatha mira =

Species of moth

Izatha mira is a moth of the family Oecophoridae. This species was originally described by Alfred Philpott. It is endemic to New Zealand and is found in the South Island. In 2025 this species was classified as "data deficient" under the New Zealand Threat Classification System.

== Taxonomy ==
This species was first described by Alfred Philpott in 1913. Philpott, thinking he was describing a new species, named the moth Izatha plumbosa in 1927. George Hudson discussed and illustrated this species in his 1928 book The butterflies and moths of New Zealand. In 2010 Robert Hoare undertook a major review of the genus Izatha. Hoare confirmed the placement of I. mira within the genus and synonymised Izatha plumbosa with that species. The male holotype, collected at The Hump in Fiordland by Philpott, is held in the New Zealand Arthropod Collection.

== Description ==
Philpott originally described this species as follows:

♂. 21 mm. Head and thorax black sprinkled with whitish. Palpi, second joint black sprinkled with white, terminal joint white with black median band. Antennae fuscous, obscurely annulated with darker. Abdomen dark fuscous, margins of segments marked with ochreous-white. Forewings moderate, costa strongly arched, apex obtuse, termen straight, hardly oblique ; black, densely sprinkled with pale bluish-white ; markings black, rather obscure ; a narrow basal patch extending a short distance on dorsum ; an irregular fascia near base, outwardly strongly oblique to fold ; a thick irregular fascia from costa at 1/3 almost to dorsum at 1/2 ; a similar obscure fascia at 2/3, touching dorsum; a series of obscure spots from costa at 3/4 round termen to tornus : cilia fuscous, with occasional white scales. Hindwings dark fuscous, fading to grey anteriorly : cilia fuscous, with darker basal line.

The wingspan is 16–21 mm for males and 17–23 mm for females.

== Distribution ==
It is endemic to New Zealand, where it is known from the western South Island, except north-west Nelson.

== Habitat ==
This species inhabits alpine and subalpine shrubland.

== Behaviour ==
Adults have been recorded in November, December and January.

== Conservation status ==
In 2025 this species was classified by the New Zealand Department of Conservation as "data deficient" under the New Zealand Threat Classification System.
