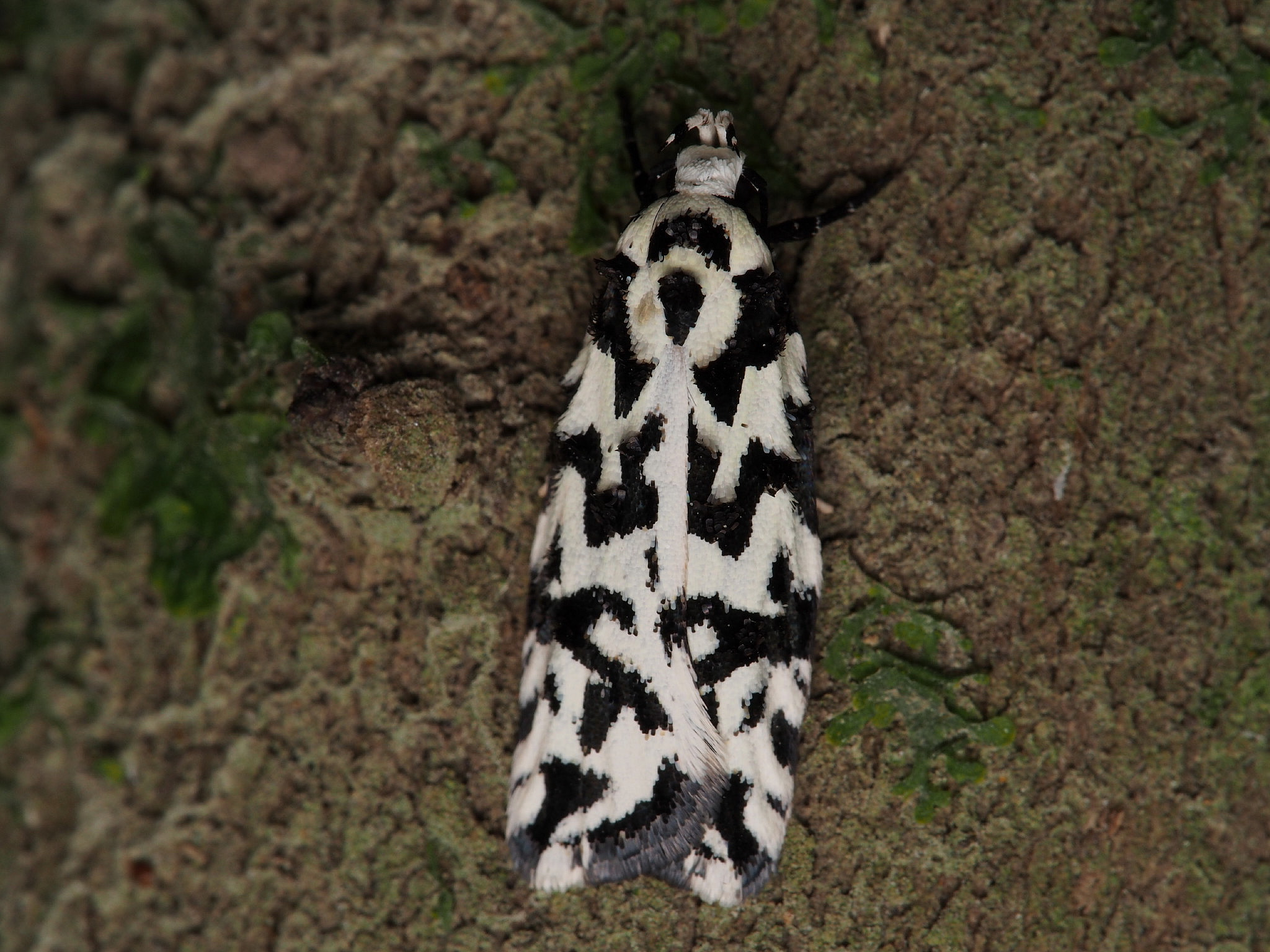

Scientific classification
- Kingdom: Animalia
- Phylum: Arthropoda
- Clade: Pancrustacea
- Class: Insecta
- Order: Lepidoptera
- Family: Oecophoridae
- Genus: Izatha
- Species: I. churtoni

Binomial name
- Izatha churtoni Dugdale, 1988

= Izatha churtoni =

Species of moth endemic to New Zealand

Izatha churtoni is a moth of the family Oecophoridae. This species was first described by John S. Dugdale in 1988. It is endemic to New Zealand, where it is widespread in the North Island only. Larvae have been recorded in dead branches of Coriaria arborea, Fuchsia excorticata and have been reared on dead branches of Pittosporum tenuifolium, Alnus rubra and Quercus species. Adults are on the wing from October to February with those specimens collected in February found at higher altitudes. Adults of this species can be distinguished from similar in appearance black and white species in the genus Izatha as it has blackish cilia on the lower portion of their forewings as well as tawny coloured scales on a raised tuft located on the side and front portion of the insect's throax.

== Taxonomy ==
This species was first described by John S. Dugdale in 1988 using a specimen collected by Rev. John Frederick Churton, likely collected in Auckland. Prior to Dugdale's treatment, this species was regarded by Francis Walker as a variety of what is now known as Izatha picarella. George Hudson discussed and illustrated this species as a variety of I. picarella in his 1928 book The butterflies and moths of New Zealand. In 2010 Robert Hoare confirmed Dugdale's treatment of this species and gave a more detailed description of it. The female holotype is held at the Natural History Museum, London.

== Description ==
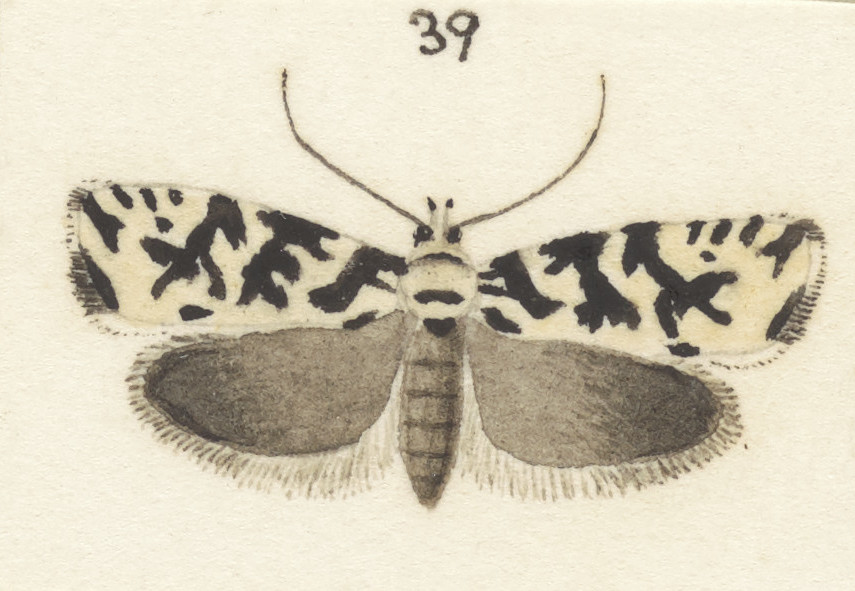
I. churtoni illustrated by Hudson.

The wingspan of the adult moth is 18–31.5 mm for males and 24.5–30 mm for females. When discussing this species as a variety Walker pointed out that the hindwings were wholly grey. Dugdale stated that this species differs from I. picarella as the latter species has all white forewing termen in comparison to I. churtoni which has black and white forewing termen. Dugdale also pointed out that these two species have distinct differences in the shape of the genitalia of the males. Robert Hoare stated that I. churtoni is the only black and white Izatha species that has blackish cilia on the lower portion of their forewings. Hoare also stated that I. churtoni is the only species to have tawny coloured scales in a raised tuft seen on the side and front portion of the throax.

I. churtoni and I. balanophora are the only two Izatha species to have a forked hindwing vein at 3A.

As at 2010 the larvae of this species has yet to be described.

== Distribution ==
This species is endemic to New Zealand. It is widespread throughout the North Island only. It is regarded as being the most commonly observed black and white coloured Izatha species.

== Behaviour ==
Adults are on wing from October to February. Many specimens collected in February have been found at altitudes of above 600m, the species is most commonly observed prior to the end of December.

== Habitat and hosts ==
Larvae have been recorded in dead branches of Coriaria arborea. One specimen was reared from a larva found in dead Fuchsia excorticata. Further rearing records are from dead wood of Alnus rubra, Quercus species and Pittosporum tenuifolium.
