= John Churton =

Reverend John Frederick Churton
- Born: 1 September 1798; Marleybone, Westminster
- Died: 27 January 1853 (aged 54); Little Sutton, St George's Bay, Auckland
- Education: Downing College, Cambridge

Ecclesiastical career
- Religion: Anglican
- Church: St Paul's Church, Auckland
- Offices held: Colonial Chaplain

John Frederick Churton was an Anglican priest and first colonial chaplain of New Zealand. Churton was born in Marleybone and matriculated at Downing College, Cambridge to study law. After graduating Churton was curate in the Diocese of St Asaph before emigrating to New Zealand in 1839. Churton was appointed to Christ Church, Russell but later moved to Auckland when Governor William Hobson appointed him colonial chaplain. Churton became the first vicar of St Paul's Church. Churton died in 1853 and shortly after a public meeting was held to establish a memorial. The Churton Memorial was constructed c.1855 but in 1885 was accidentally destroyed. 23 years later a new memorial was erected on the site of the original St Paul's Church, which is now registered as a category 2 structure with Heritage New Zealand.

== Biography ==
St Paul's Church in Emily Place c.1855–1885. The original Churton Memorial is visible

John Frederick Churton was born 1 September 1798 in Marleybone, Westminster. and baptised at the St Marylebone Parish Church. Churton married Mary Falwasser on 2 September 1826 at St Pancras Old Church, Middlesex. Churton was educated at Great Ealing School and in 1829 matriculated at Downing College, Cambridge. Churton graduated with a Bachelors of Law in 1833. Churton's first position was curate at Tadlow and East Hatley in 1830 in the Diocese of Ely. The following year he became assistant minister at the Quebec Chapel in the Diocese of London and in 1832 he became curate for Threapwood, Wrexham, and Flintshire in the Diocese of St Asaph. In 1839 Churton departed Wrexham for New Zealand aboard the Bolton and arrived in Wellington in April 1840. A few months after arriving in Wellington Churton was appointed to Christ Church, Russell by Bishop of Australia William Grant Broughton. Governor William Hobson apponted him colonial chaplain and he moved to the inchoate capital of Auckland. Churton was ordained vicar at St Paul's Church whilst still serving as colonial chaplain. Churton's position had him minister to soldiers, hospital patients, and prisoners, as well as performing the opening prayer for the Legislative Council. Churton died at his residence Little Sutton in St George's Bay on 27 January 1853 from pleurisy.

== Memorial ==
Photo of the new Churton Memorial taken after its dedication

Shortly after Churton's death the idea of a public memorial was floated and £68 was raised, including £25 from the 58th regiment. In March a meeting at the Mechanics' Institute discussed what sort of memorial should be established. Ideas included a hospital for the poor, a commemorative tablet in St Paul's Church, or a public monument — the latter was decided upon. A committee was formed to erect the monument, committee included architect Frederick Thatcher, 58th regiment Captain Henry Balneavis, and Surveyor-General Charles Ligar. Thatcher may have designed the memorial given his architectural expertise. The memorial was erected by c.March 1855 outside St Paul's.

In 1885 the Auckland Harbour Board began cutting down Emily Place for reclamation works at Commercial Bay. As the Churton Memorial was on public land the church took no role in relocating it. Auckland City Council attempted to relocate the memorial to Albert Park but the monument was accidentally destroyed by the contractor; only the slate tablet was preserved.

The memorial was not forgotten despite the destruction and multiple plans were made to reinstate it: in July 1894 the Auckland Town Clerk approached Churton's son about the state of the slate tablet. In 1900 the Auckland City Council rejected the re-erection of the Churton Memorial in the nascent Emily Place Reserve. Supporters of the memorial did not concede and proposed a memorial drinking fountain. In 1908 the city council had reversed its position, donating £20 for the erection of a memorial in Emily Place Reserve. The remaining £78 was raised through donations. A Coromandel granite obelisk was erected, this obelisk included the original slate tablet and two drinking fountains. The Churton Memorial was formally opened on 7 February 1909. Richard Robert Hunt, secretary of the Churton Memorial Fund, formally transferred the obelisk to Mayor Arthur Myers.

The re-erection of the Churton Memorial reflected ties between the British Empire and New Zealand; at the centenary of St Paul's Church a celebration took place at the memorial, references to ties between New Zealand the home country were made with references to the on-going war in Europe. Governor Cyril Newall installed a bronze memorial tablet as part of the centennial commemoration.

In 1968 the obelisk was temporarily removed to be restored. At some point the drinking fountains were decommissioned and filled in. Churton Memorial remains in Emily Place Reserve, surrounded by a pohutukawa grove. The memorial is registered as a category 2 structure with Heritage New Zealand.

== Entomology ==
Four insect species were described from specimens collected by Churton: Izatha churtoni, which was named after Churton; Leioproctus imitatus; Proteuxoa comma; and Feredayia graminosa.
