= St. George's Bay =

St. George's Bay may refer to the following places:

- St. George's Bay (Newfoundland and Labrador), Canada
- St. George's Bay (Nova Scotia), Canada
- Saint George Bay, Beirut, Lebanon
- St. George's Bay, St. Julian's, Malta
- St. George's Bay, Birżebbuġa, Malta
- St George's Bay, Auckland

== See also ==
- St. George's Bay Company, later Sierra Leone Company, founded in 1790
