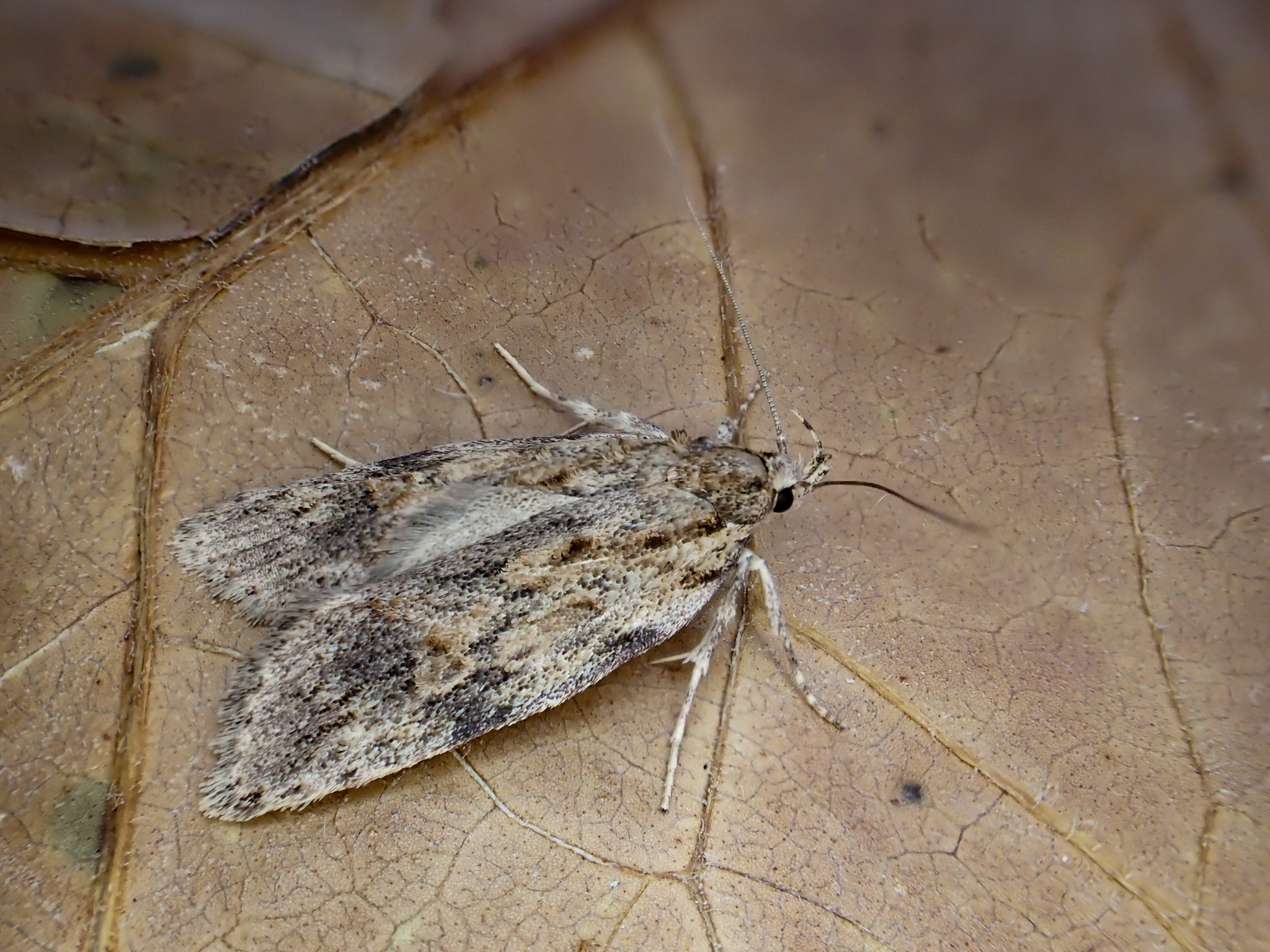

Scientific classification
- Kingdom: Animalia
- Phylum: Arthropoda
- Class: Insecta
- Order: Lepidoptera
- Family: Oecophoridae
- Genus: Izatha
- Species: I. voluptuosa

Binomial name
- Izatha voluptuosa Hoare, 2010

= Izatha voluptuosa =

Species of moth

Izatha voluptuosa is a species of moth in the family Oecophoridae. It is endemic to New Zealand. This species is classified as "Not Threatened" by the Department of Conservation.

== Taxonomy and etymology ==
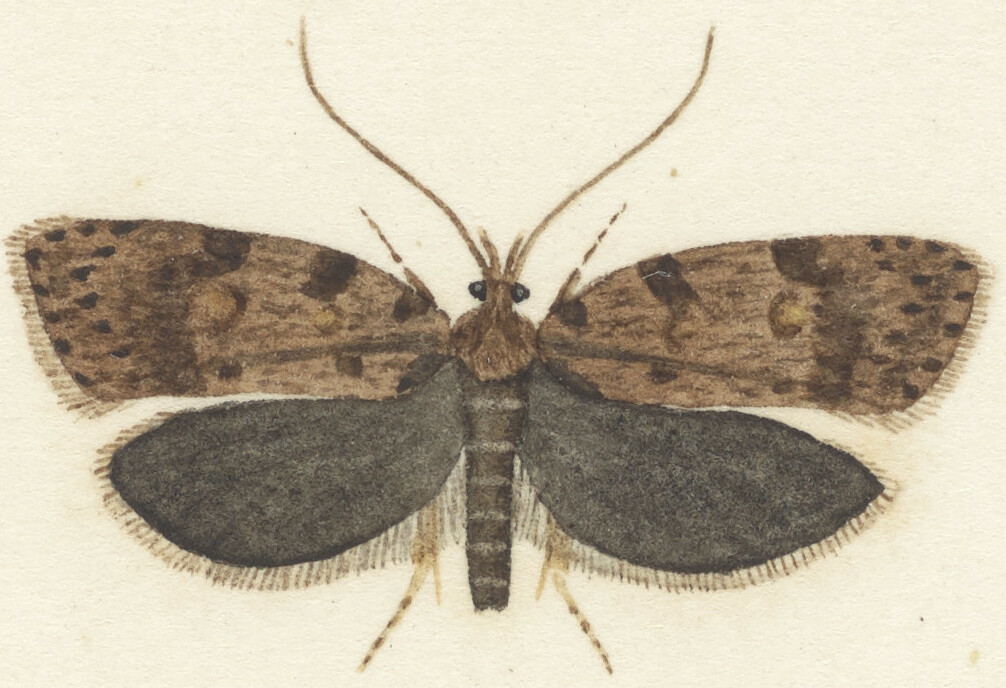
Watercolour by George Hudson, c. 1927

This species was described by Robert J. B. Hoare in 2010. I. voluptuosa was first collected by George Hudson at Ohakune in January 1912. However the species was misidentified. Hudson illustrated the species in his 1928 book The butterflies & moths of New Zealand. The holotype specimen is held at the Auckland War Memorial Museum. This species is monophyletic, similar to other members of the Izatha genus such as I. attactella and I. blepharidota. The epithet is obtained from the Latin word voluptuosus and refers to the large size and broad wings of the female of this species.

== Description ==
The larvae of I. voluptuose have yet to be described.

The wingspan is 29–31 mm for males and 33–40 mm for females. The female of this species has the greatest wingspan of gelechioid moths in New Zealand. The species appears similar to I. attactella and I. blepharidota. I. voluptuose can be distinguished from I. attactella as I. voluptuose has a wider forewing, has less conspicuous scale-tufts, and a shorter dark basal streak. I. voluptuose is also generally on the wing later in the season and in the male of that species the hook-like teeth on the right lobe of the phallus are backward pointing. I. voluptuose can be distinguished from I. blepharidota as the veins on the forewings of I. voluptuosa are similar to the colour of the rest of the wing.

== Distribution ==
It is endemic to New Zealand. It is known from scattered localities in North Island in the following areas: Northland, Auckland, Bay of Plenty, Taranaki, Taupō and Rangitikei.

== Biology and behaviour ==
Adults are on wing from November to February with the moths being most prevalent in January and February.

== Host species and habitat ==
Larvae have been reared from rotten logs including those of Weinmannia racemosa.

== Conservation status ==
This species has been classified as being "Not Threatened" under the New Zealand Threat Classification System.
