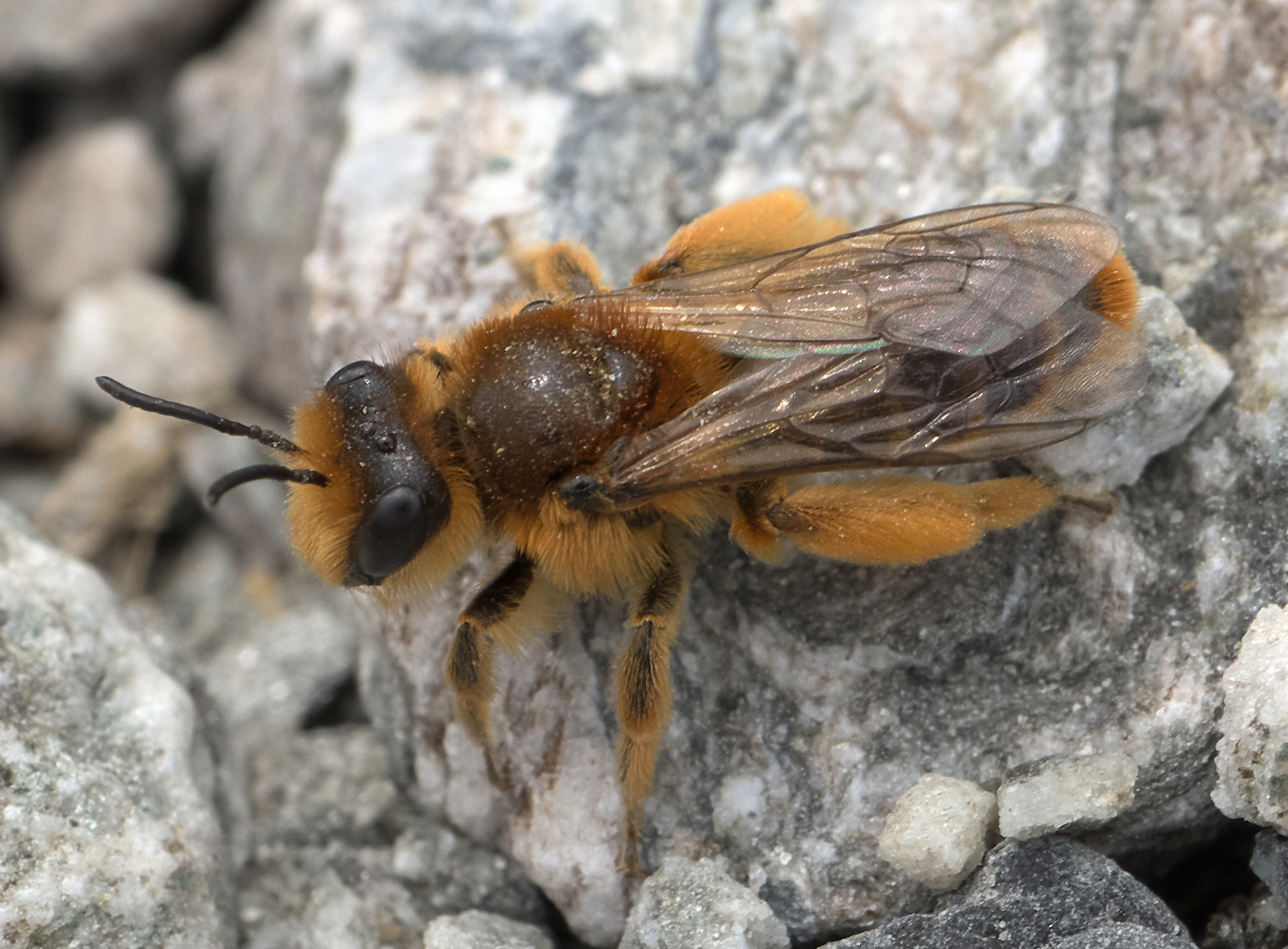
- Leioproctus fulvescens, Otago, New Zealand

Scientific classification
- Kingdom: Animalia
- Phylum: Arthropoda
- Clade: Pancrustacea
- Class: Insecta
- Order: Hymenoptera
- Family: Colletidae
- Tribe: Paracolletini
- Genus: Leioproctus; F. Smith, 1853

Type species
- Leioproctus imitatus Smith, 1853

= Leioproctus =

Genus of bees

Leioproctus is a genus in the plaster bee family Colletidae and subfamily Colletinae. Its members, also known as hairy colletid bees, are mainly found in Australasia and temperate South America.

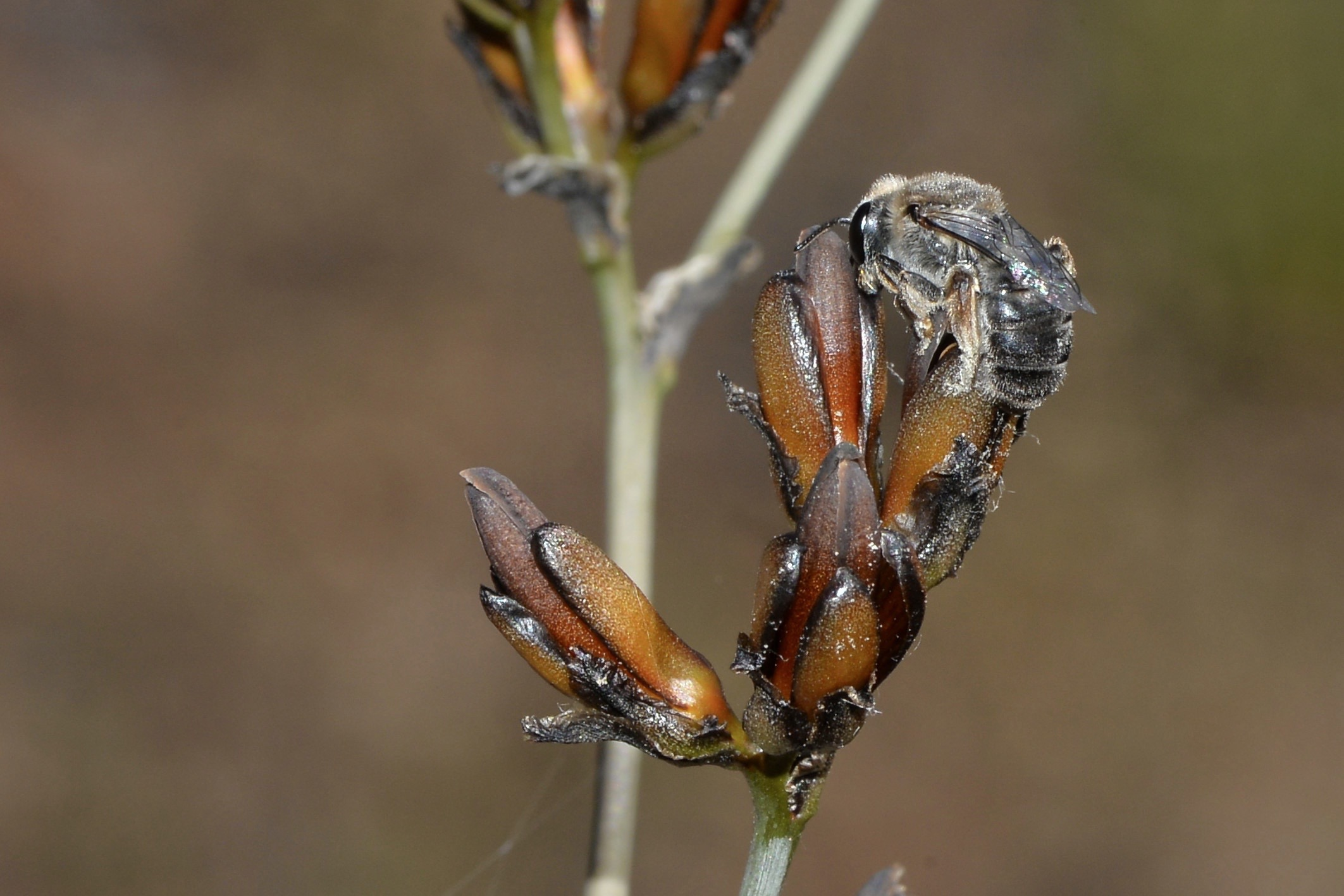
Leioproctus sp. female on Haemodorum flowers in Western Australia

== Species ==
See: List of Leioproctus species.

== Description ==
Species within the genus Leioproctus are small, black, hairy bees ranging from 4–16 mm. Most are less than 10 mm in length, but the largest species, Leioproctus muelleri, reaches up to 16 mm.

The legs and thorax are covered in hairs ranging from black through brown, red and yellow to white, although hair colour typically fades with age. The dorsal surface of the abdomen is mostly hairless showing the shiny black cuticle underneath. The clypeus and supraclypeus are typically hairy while the forehead is often mostly hairless, possibly to avoid interference with the ocelli. The supraclypeus is almost completely flat and is densely punctured throughout.

Females may be distinguished by the pollen clumps carried externally on their scopae.

== Ecology ==
=== General diet ===
All their nutrients come directly or indirectly from pollen and nectar. Pollen is the main source of protein, required for growth, so it is consumed mostly during the larval stage, while nectar provides sugar, which provides the energy adults and larvae need throughout their life.

Most species show medium degrees of specialisation for native flowering plants and trees. However, many species in New Zealand have been recorded visiting kiwifruit flowers, and agricultural studies have caught them in clover pastures and orchards. This plasticity varies between species, which some studies have shown to be more willing to feed from introduced plants than others.

=== Foraging behaviour ===
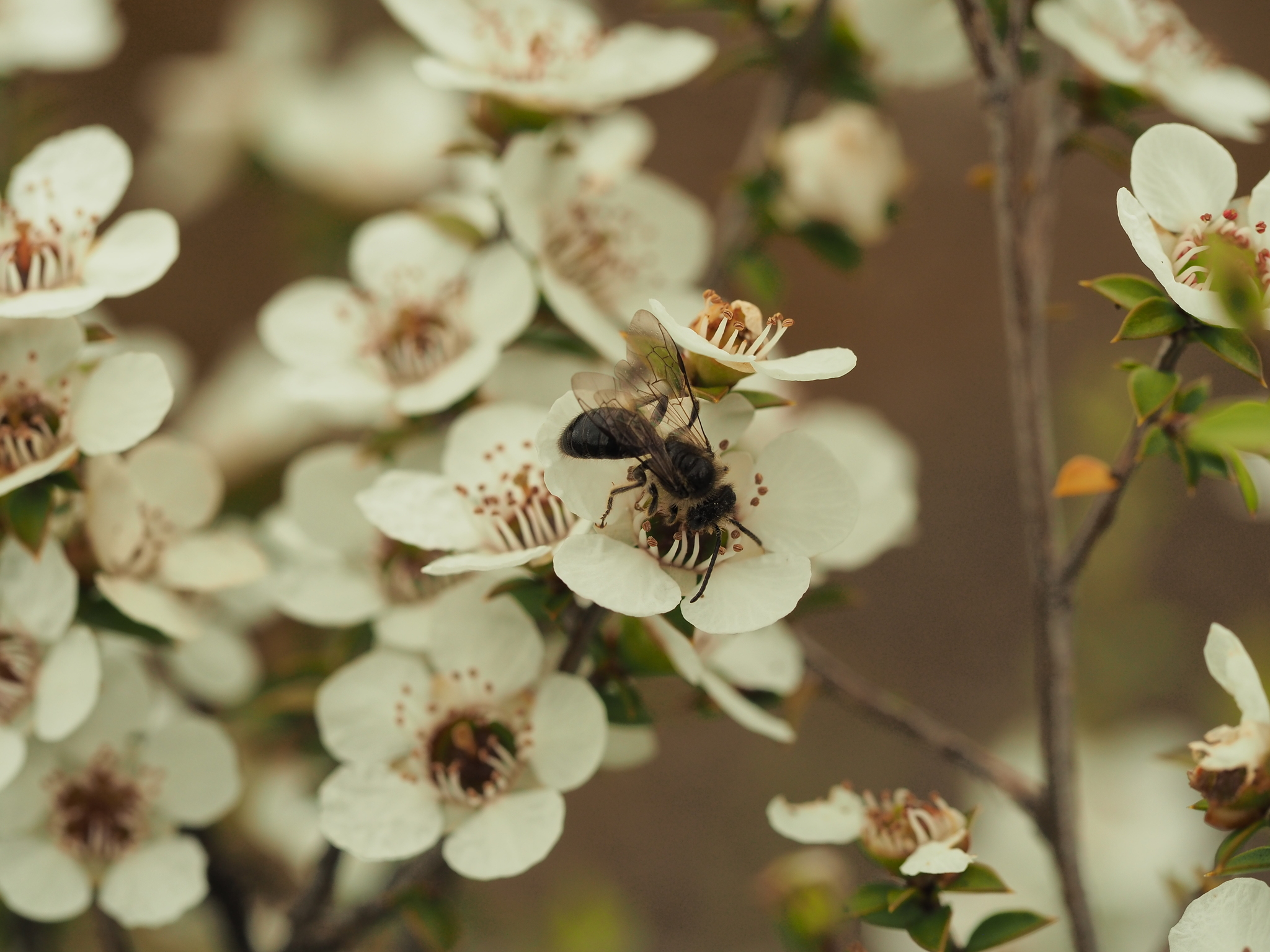
Leioproctus sp. on Manuka flowers

Leioproctus species show almost no territorial behaviour, and often nest and feed within close proximity of each other, although they show a range of distances and foraging times between individuals as well as species. A theme common to all species is that they typically nest close (within 10 m) to rich food sources, such as large Mānuka trees, which are common in New Zealand and eastern Australia.

=== Pollination ===
Leioproctus sp. pollinating Gastrolobium calycinum

Leioproctus sp. at Stylidium confluens flowers

Most Leioproctus species are specialised, often to a particular genus or family of plants, something that is beneficial since specialised pollinators increase the likelihood of pollen being spread to the correct recipient.

The males are relatively short-lived and have little impact on pollination, but the females intentionally collect pollen by accumulating it in the hairs around the head and thorax, while feeding on nectar, before moving it to the scopae. This morphology allows pollen to be more effectively spread between flowers than other potential pollinators such as other insects and birds.

Leioproctus are particularly important pollinators for many endangered native plants, such as rare proteas in Australia, many of which are strictly self-incompatible and rely on pollinators for survival. Multiple studies on Persoonia (geebungs) found that Leiproctus was the most common genus of pollinators at their study sites. Many Leioproctus species live in dry woodlands on acidic sandy soils as they are mining bees that can tolerate such harsh environments.

In New Zealand, Leioproctus is the largest genus of native bees, and the most common after introduced Apis and Bombus bees. Both those genera are more efficient than Leioproctus at pollination, but prefer introduced plants to natives, making Leioproctus and other native bees still vital to native forests.

Research has gone into using native bees for commercial pollination and found positive results and successful trials of nest removal and re-establishment. Because they nest individually, they are less likely to spread diseases such as Varroa mites and AFB, a factor of increasing interest in agriculture.

=== Impact from introduced honeybees ===
The effect introduced bees have had on native plants and bees is still unclear, but some ecologists have concerns about the effect being negative.

Introduced honeybees have been recorded visiting many of the species previously associated with native bees. For most native plant species this is atypical and unintentional of beekeepers, but due to the high demand for Mānuka honey, Leioproctus bees are now seeing high competition in some places. Because domestic honeybees live in mobile hives, beekeepers can move these hives into high resource areas and then remove them once the nectar and pollen are depleted, forcing the sessile leioproctus bees to travel far distances to find resources. Although Leiproctus species feed from species other than Mānuka, many still rely on this food source to support them over the summer, so this increased competition could reduce Leioproctus populations which could then affect the other native plants they pollinate.

== Habitat ==
Leioproctus are solitary mining bees. They can tolerate a high range of substrate provided there are sufficient food resources nearby. This can range from forest undergrowth to roadside ditches to sandy costal banks to even currently occupied termite nests in at least one Australian species. Leioproctus need warm temperatures (at least 15 °C) before leaving their nest, typically waiting until the nest entrance is bathed in sun. Because of this, most nests face towards the north, or if in flat ground, will be well exposed to maximise heat absorption.

They prefer dry ground and will often dig horizontal tunnels in banks and cliffs. Their nests are not lined with water repellent coatings, as seen in other bee nests, but nest architecture shows they can also make sink traps, potentially to prevent water from entering cells, suggesting they can tolerate wet environments. This tolerance to wet conditions has been observed in multiple studies where as long as it was reasonably warm, bees would be seen, no matter the rainfall.

== Life cycle ==
Leioproctus bees are solitary, meaning that each female is fertile and creates her own nest for her young.

Leioproctus overwinters as diapausing prepupae in cells before they pupate and begin appearing in spring or early summer. Males typically appear first, closely followed by females. They mate immediately and the females begin nest mining while the males continue breeding. The males soon die while the females finish their nests and start producing cells. Larvae require a lot of pollen and nectar to grow and survive to adulthood, and the females have a lot of environmental pressures, so most only make 10–30 cells in their 6–8 week adult lifetime, before perishing. After the eggs are laid, the larvae hatch around 72 hours later and consume all stored food over the next 10 days, then over the next few weeks become prepupae and diapause until the following spring.

== Distribution ==
=== Australia ===
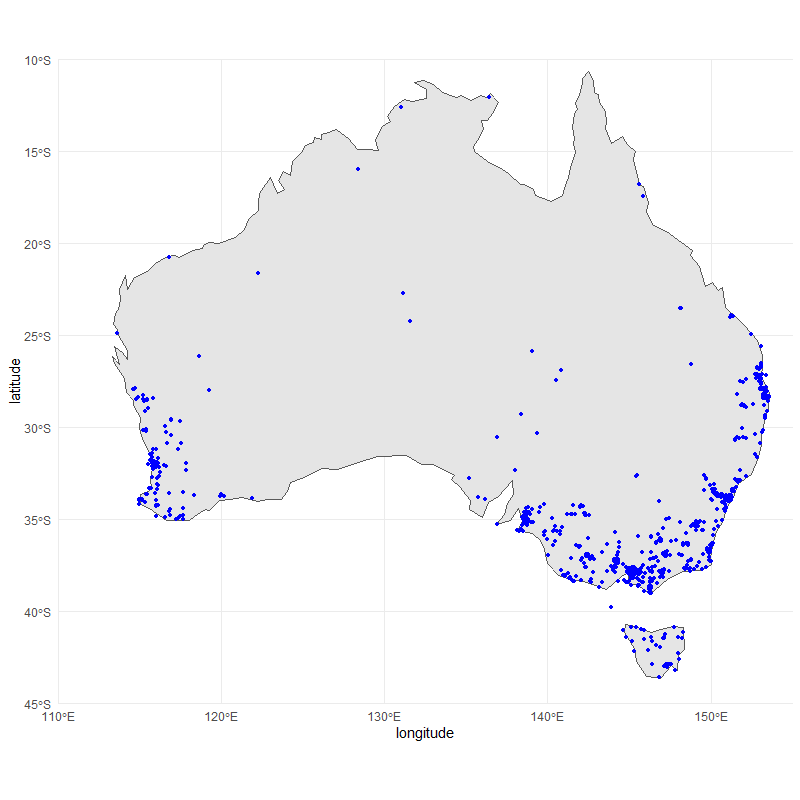
Distribution map of iNaturalist Leioproctus spp. sightings in Au.

As of 2026 about 280 species of Leioproctus had been discovered across Australia.

Native Australian Leioproctus bees forage on the flowers of a wide range of native plants, such as Persoonia (geebungs) in Proteaceae, and legumes such as Daviesia and Acacia in Fabaceae. Leptospermum, Eucalyptus and other myrtaceous trees are also visited by some species.

=== New Zealand ===
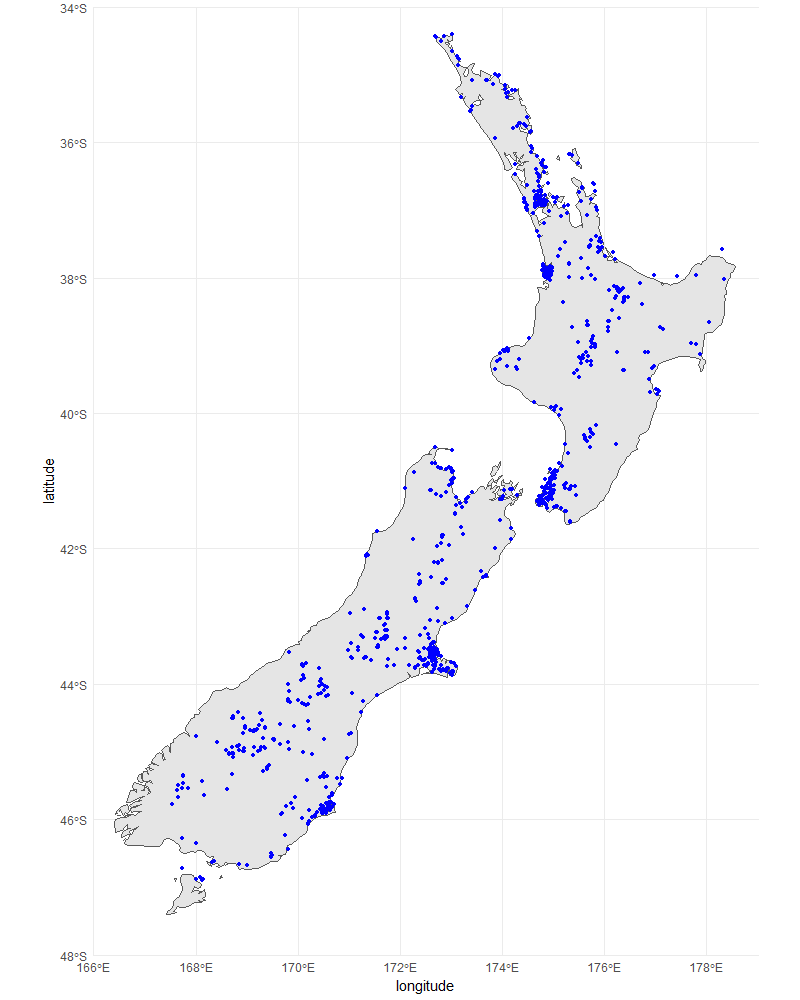
Distribution map of iNaturalist Leioproctus spp. sightings in NZ.

At least 18 species of Leioproctus can be found across New Zealand, where they are the commonest native bees.

They mainly forage on the flowers of native plants in the Myrtaceae family, such as Pōhutukawa, Kānuka and Mānuka. However, some species will also forage on introduced plants such as fruit trees and pasture vegetation.

=== South America ===
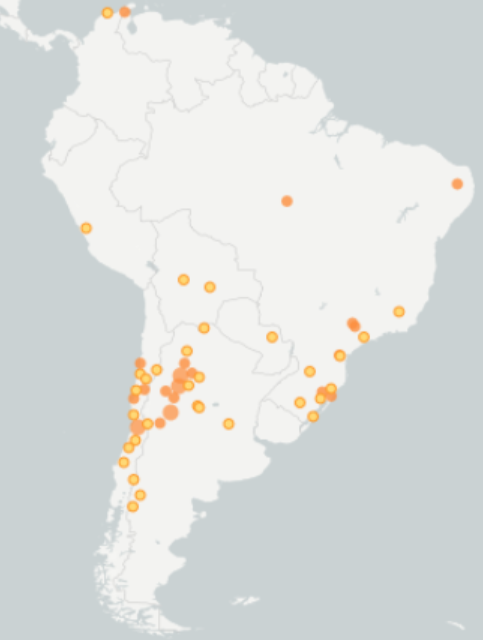
Screenshot from GBIF of the Distribution map of Leioproctus spp. sightings in South America.

More than 60 species of Leioproctus can be found across South America.

Research and information on Leioproctus species found in South America is seriously lacking. In New Zealand and Australia Leioproctus bees feed primarily on species within the Proteaceae, Fabaceae and Myrtaceae families. These three plant families contain over 3,000 species in South America, so the bees' choice of forage plants and their feeding behaviour there may be similar to that in Australasia. However, as of 2024, this had not been confirmed.

== See also ==
- Colletidae genera and species
