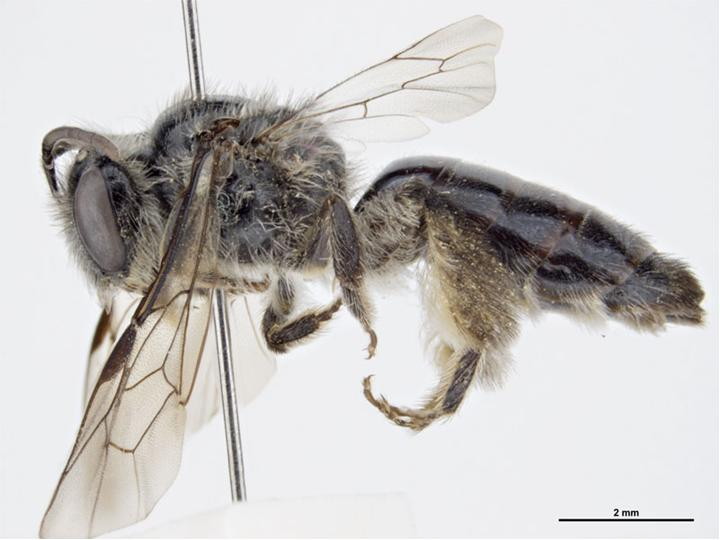
- Female

Scientific classification
- Kingdom: Animalia
- Phylum: Arthropoda
- Class: Insecta
- Order: Hymenoptera
- Family: Colletidae
- Genus: Leioproctus
- Species: L. imitatus

Binomial name
- Leioproctus imitatus Smith, 1853
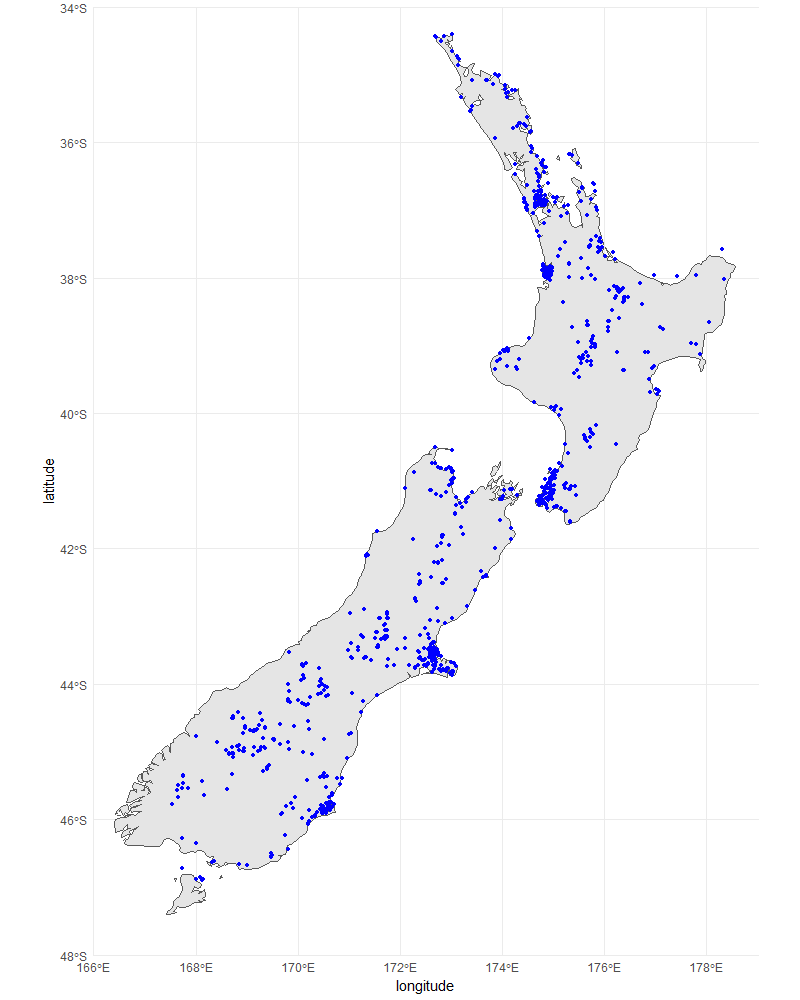
- Distribution map of iNaturalist Leioproctus spp. sightings. (All 9 NZ species, not just L. imitatus)

= Leioproctus imitatus =

Species of bee endemic to New Zealand

Leioproctus imitatus is a species of plaster bee in the family Colletidae. It is a small, black, solitary bee that is endemic to New Zealand.

== Taxonomy ==
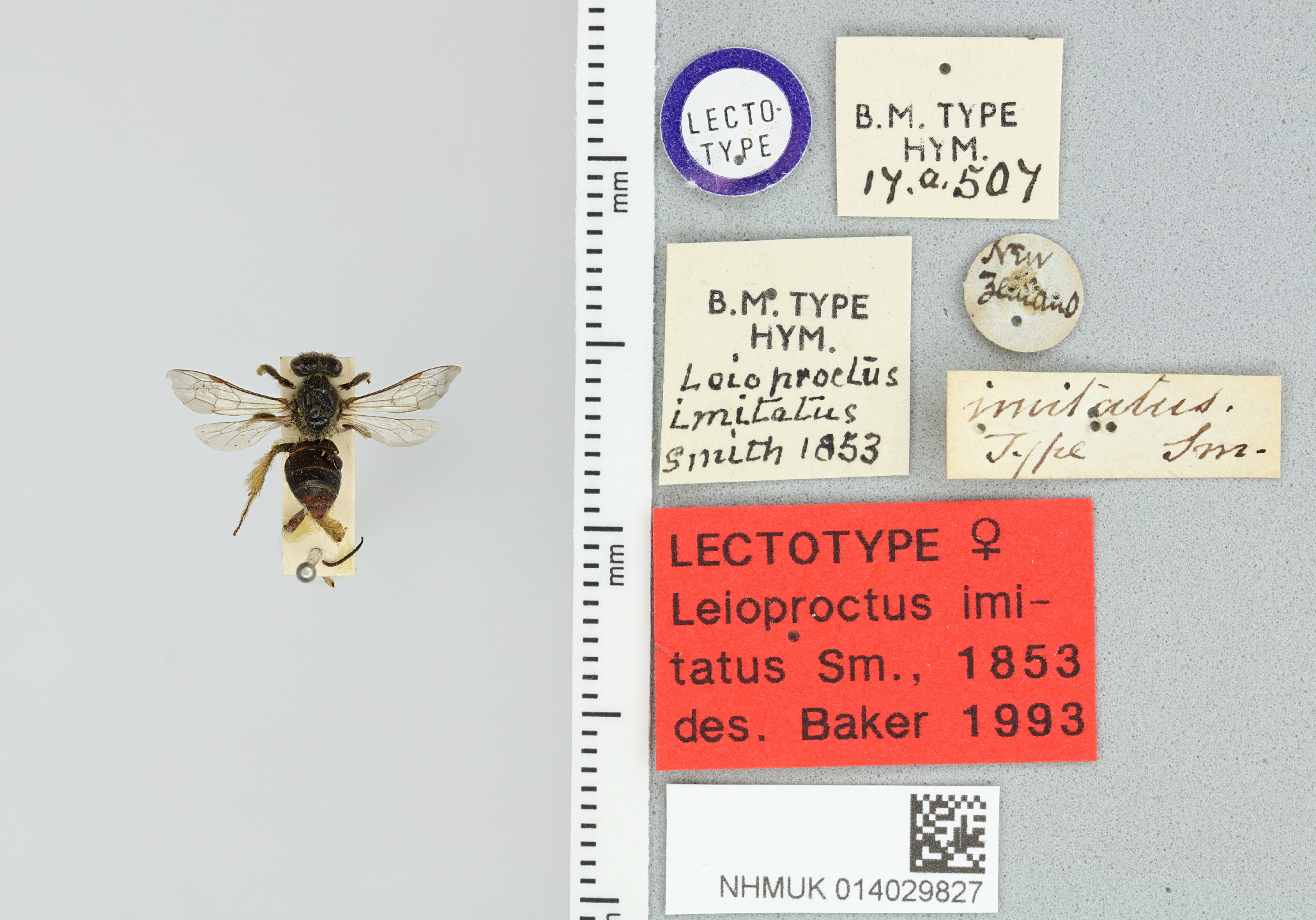
Female lectotype of Leioproctus imitatus held at the Natural History Museum, London.

Leioproctus imitatus was first described in 1853 by Frederick Smith. This written description was published in the Catalogue of hymenopterous insects in the collection of the British Museum (No. 898) using a specimen collected by Rev. John Frederick Churton in Auckland. The lectotype specimen is still held today at the Natural History Museum, London. Leioproctus imitatus Smith is the type species of the subgenus Leioproctus by designation of Cockerell 1905.

== Description ==
Leioproctus imitatus is a black, hairy bee ranging from 5 –13.4 mm. The legs and thorax are covered in hairs ranging from black to yellow to white, although hair colour typically fades with age. The dorsal surface of the abdomen is mostly hairless showing the shiny black cuticle underneath. The clypeus and supraclypeus are typically hairy while the forehead is often mostly hairless, likely to avoid interference with the ocelli. Supraclypeus is almost completely flat and is densely punctured throughout.

Hairs on young males are often orange, fading as they age. Females carry pollen externally on scopae.

== Range ==
Leioproctus imitatus is endemic to New Zealand. L. imitatus is currently believed to be widely distributed across New Zealand and can be found in the North and South islands and many coastal islands including Stuart Island/Rakiura.

Although there have been no formal nationwide population studies on L. imitatus or the Leioproctus genus, estimates can still be made using iNaturalist and local studies.

This distribution map shown was created with all sightings of Leioproctus on iNaturalist. Because specific Leioproctus species can be difficult to identify, most sightings only go to genus, but there is high habitat similarity between species so this map still shows the national range of the genus.

In 2007, a 3-year study done on Native bees in Whangārei found that 27% of the 782 bees collected were L. imitatus, showing it is one of the more common species in the genus.

== Habitat ==
Leioproctus imitatus are solitary mining bees. Their preferred habitat is ground with penetrable substrate with sufficient nearby food resources. This can range from forest undergrowth to roadside ditches to even sandy costal banks, provided there is sufficient food. L. imitatus like the rest of Leioproctus need warm temperatures (at least 15°C) before leaving their nest, typically waiting until the nest entrance is bathed in sun. Because of this, most nests face towards the north, or if in flat ground, will be well exposed to maximise heat absorption.

They prefer dry ground and will often dig horizontal tunnels in banks and cliffs, but nest architecture shows they can also make sink traps, potentially to prevent water from entering cells, suggesting they can tolerate wet environments. This tolerance to wet conditions has been observed in multiple studies where as long as it was reasonably warm, bees would be seen, no matter the rainfall.

They almost always nest within 10 metres of at least one large food source, such a Pōhutukawa tree or a clump of smaller Mānuka trees. Their ability to utilise a wide range of substrates as nest sites and the national spread of suitable food sources allows L. imitatus to nest throughout the country.

== Diet and foraging ==
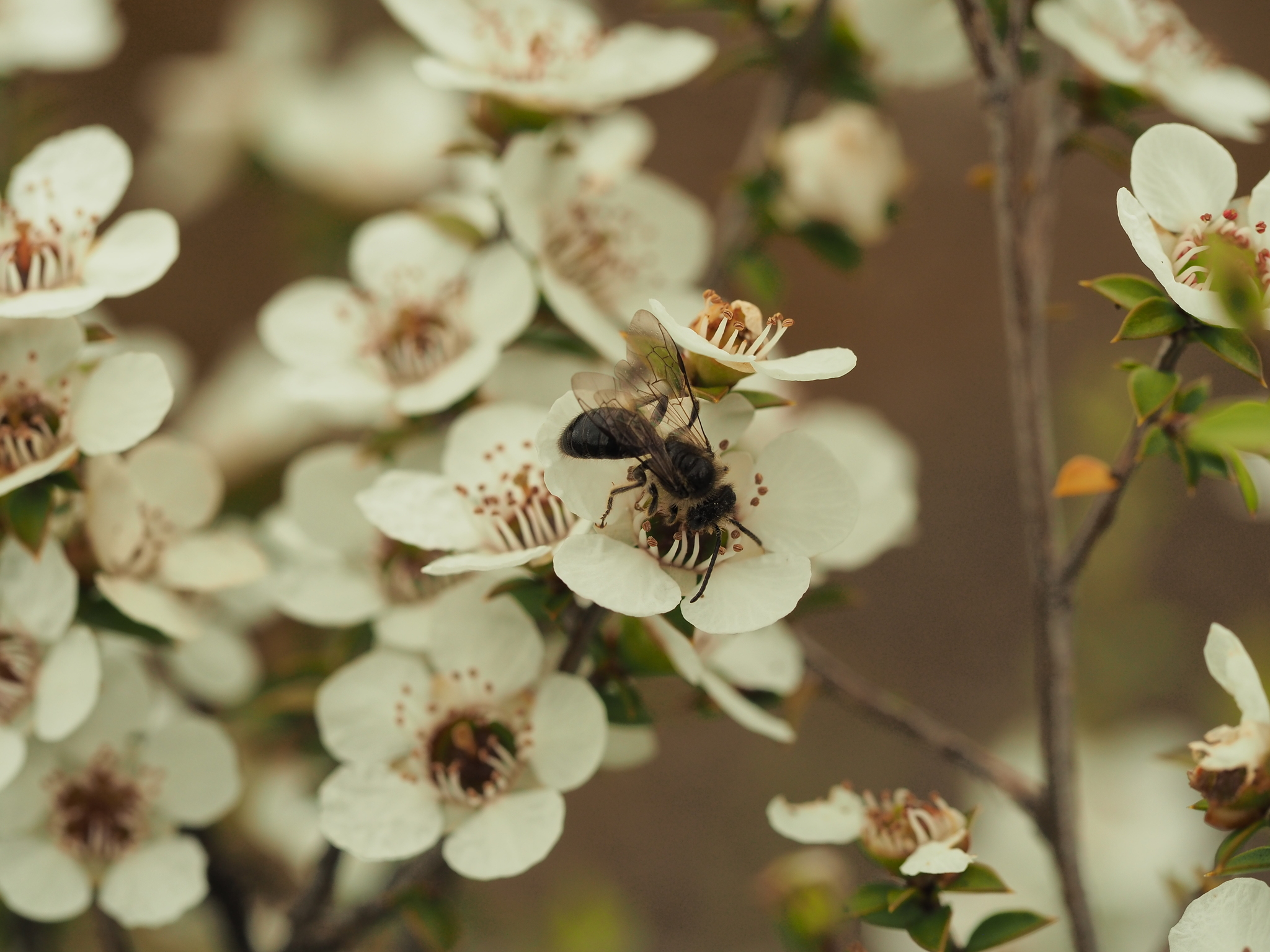
Species of Leioproctus on mānuka flowers.

=== Food ===
All their nutrients come directly or indirectly from pollen and nectar. Pollen is the main source of protein, required for growth, so it is consumed mostly during the larval stage, while nectar provides sugar, which provides the energy adults and larvae need throughout their life.

Leioproctus imitatus primarily forages on the flowers of native species in the Myrtaceae family, such as pōhutukawa (Metrosideros excelsa), kānuka (Kunzea ericoides) and mānuka (Leptospermum scoparium). This species also shows some foraging plasticity and will forage on introduced species if necessary. L. imitatus has been recorded visiting kiwifruit flowers, and agricultural studies have caught them in clover pastures and orchards.

=== Foraging behaviour ===
Leioproctus imitatus will forage up to 2 hours in one session and prefer to stay within 10 m (33 ft) of the nesting site. They show almost no territorial behaviours, and often nest and feed within close proximity of each other.

== Life cycle ==
Leioproctus imitatus overwinters as diapausing prepupae in cells before they pupate and begin appearing in spring or early summer between September and December. Males typically appear first closely followed by females. Immediately they mate and the females begin nest mining while the males continue breeding. The males soon die while the females finish their nests and start producing cells. Larvae require a lot of pollen and nectar to grow and survive to adulthood, and the females have a lot of environmental pressures, so most only make 10-30 cells in their 6-8 week lifetime, before perishing. After the eggs are laid, the larvae hatch around 72 hours later and consume all stored food over the next 10 days, then over the next few weeks become prepupae and diapause until the following spring.
