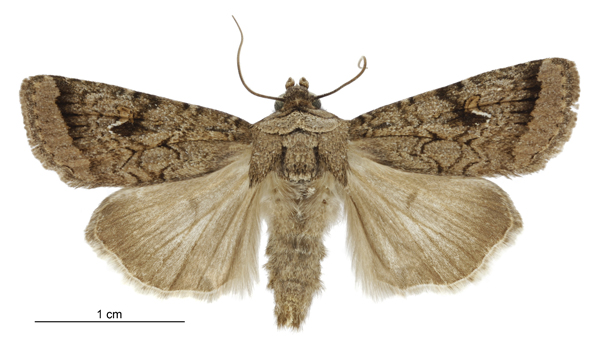
- Male
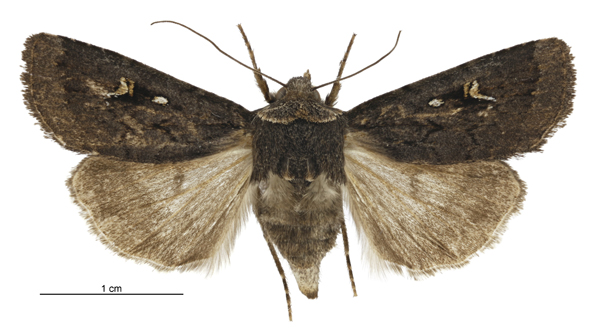
- Female

Conservation status
- Not Threatened (NZ TCS)

Scientific classification
- Kingdom: Animalia
- Phylum: Arthropoda
- Clade: Pancrustacea
- Class: Insecta
- Order: Lepidoptera
- Superfamily: Noctuoidea
- Family: Noctuidae
- Genus: Proteuxoa
- Species: P. comma

Binomial name
- Proteuxoa comma (Walker, 1856)

Synonyms
- Mamestra comma Walker, 1856; Graphiphoga implexa Walker, 1857; Graphiphora implexa Walker, 1857; Orthosia comma (Walker, 1856); Hadena plusiata Walker, 1865; Nitocris bicomma Guenée, 1868; Rictonis comma (Walker, 1856)

= Proteuxoa comma =

Species of moth

Proteuxoa comma is a species of moth in the family Noctuidae. It is endemic to New Zealand. It can be found in the lower half of the North Island and throughout the South Island, although it appears to be more frequent on the eastern side of these islands, and also is present in Stewart Island. P. comma is very similar in appearance to P. tetronycha but can be distinguished as it is a larger moth with slightly different colouration on, as well as shape of, its forewings. This species pupates in the soil. The adult moths are on the wing from December to April. P. comma may possibly be declining in population and as at 2017 a reassessment of its conservation status is regarded as being needed.

== Taxonomy ==
This species was originally described by Francis Walker in 1856 and named Mamestra comma. The female holotype specimen was collected by Reverend John Frederick Churton. J. S. Dugdale presumed Churton collected this specimen in Auckland however Robert Hoare has hypothesised that Wellington may possibly be the type locality for this species. The holotype specimen is held at the Natural History Museum, London. In 1857 Walker, thinking he was describing a new species, again named this species Graphiphora implexa. In 1868 Achille Guenée replaced Walker's comma name with Nitocris bicomma. In 1887 Edward Meyrick synonymised both this name and Graphiphora implexa and moved the species into the Orthosia genus. In 1988 J. S. Dugdale placed this species in the Rictonis genus. In 2017 Robert Hoare undertook a review of Noctuinae. In this review he placed this species in the Proteuxoa genus.

== Description ==
Walker originally described the species as follows:

Female. Cinereous. Head whitish. Palpi with whitish tips. Thorax and fore wings sprinkled with brown. Fore wings with brown transverse undulating or zigzag lines. Hind wings paler towards the base. Length of the body 6 lines; of the wings 16 lines.

The adult male of this species has a wingspan of between 32 and 37 mm and the female has a wingspan of between 33 and 37 mm. P. comma can be distinguished from the very similar P. tetronycha as P. comma has a less contrasting prothoracic collar and a more grey forewing ground colour. P. comma also has a narrower winged appearance than P. tetronycha. P. comma is slightly larger than P. tetronycha. If the wingspan of a specimen is above 33 mm then the species is P. comma.

== Distribution ==
This species is endemic to New Zealand. The species can be found in the lower half of the North Island and throughout the South Island, although it appears to be more frequent on the drier, eastern side of these islands, and is also present in Stewart Island.

== Behaviour ==
This species pupates in the soil. The adults of this species are on the wing from December to April.

== Biology and host species ==
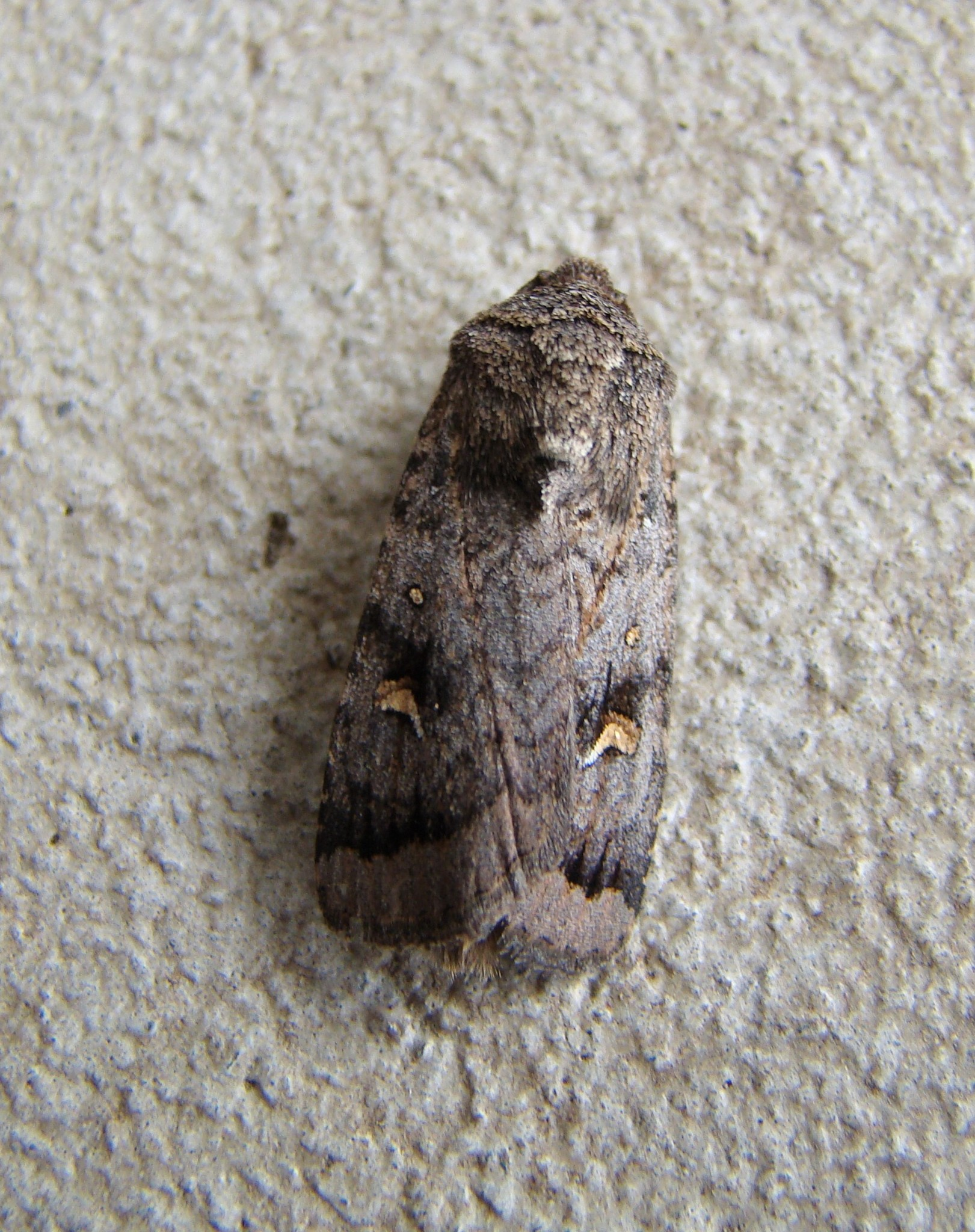
Proteuxoa comma, citizen science observation confirmed by Robert Hoare

As a result of the previous confusion with P. tetronycha, as at 2017 there is currently no description of P. comma larva that does not also relate to P. tetronycha. The same is true for larval host species and rearing records, although P. comma larvae have been reared on Brassica oleracea.

== Conservation status ==
P. comma may possibly be declining in population, likely caused by environmental changes. In 2017 Hoare advocated for a reassessment of this species conservation status. As at 2025 this species has been assessed as being "not threatened" under the New Zealand Threat Classification System.
