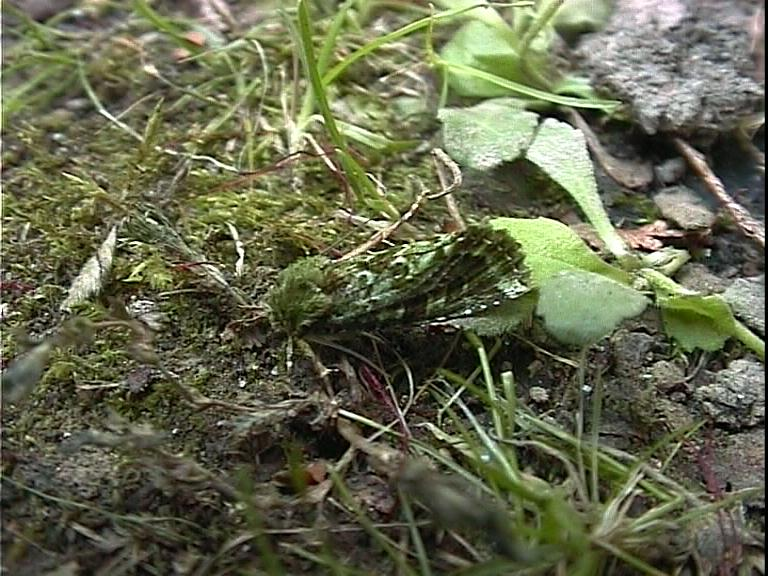
- Feredayia graminosa

Scientific classification
- Domain: Eukaryota
- Kingdom: Animalia
- Phylum: Arthropoda
- Class: Insecta
- Order: Lepidoptera
- Superfamily: Noctuoidea
- Family: Noctuidae
- Subfamily: Noctuinae
- Tribe: Hadenini
- Genus: Feredayia; Kirkaldy, 1910

Synonyms
- Erana Walker, 1857

= Feredayia =

Genus of moths

Feredayia is a genus of moths of the family Noctuidae.

== Selected species ==
- Feredayia graminosa (Walker, 1857)
