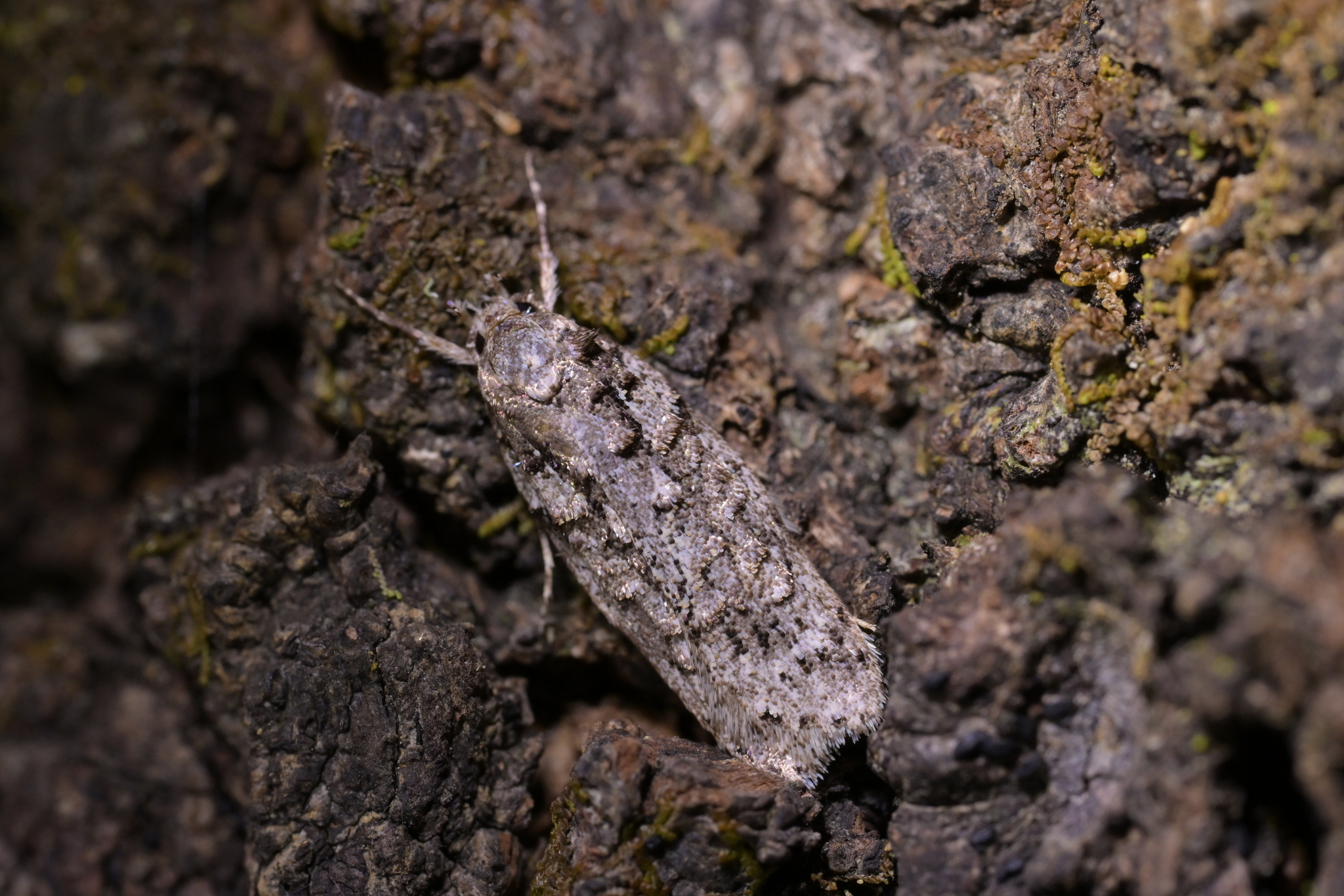

Scientific classification
- Kingdom: Animalia
- Phylum: Arthropoda
- Class: Insecta
- Order: Lepidoptera
- Family: Oecophoridae
- Genus: Izatha
- Species: I. attactella

Binomial name
- Izatha attactella Walker, 1864

Synonyms
- Semiocosma platyptera Meyrick, 1888

= Izatha attactella =

Species of moth endemic to New Zealand

Izatha attactella is a moth of the family Oecophoridae. This species is endemic to New Zealand, where it is known from both the North and South Islands as far south as mid-Canterbury. Larvae of this species feed on the soft inner surface of the bark of dead trees and shrubs. Adults have been recorded from July to January but are most common from September to December.

== Taxonomy ==
This species was first described by Francis Walker in 1864 from specimens obtained by Colonel D. Bolton in Auckland and Mr Sinclair. The lectotype specimen is held at the Natural History Museum, London. In 1888 Edward Meyrick, thinking he was describing a new species, named this moth Semiocosma platyptera. The lectotype for this description was collected by George Hudson in Wellington and is also held at the Natural History Museum, London. In 1915 Meyrick synonymised this name with I. attactella. This synonymy was upheld by Robert J. B. Hoare in 2010.

Hudson discussed and illustrated the species in his book The butterflies and moths of New Zealand. Alfred Philpott studied and published on the male genitalia of this species in 1927.

== Description ==
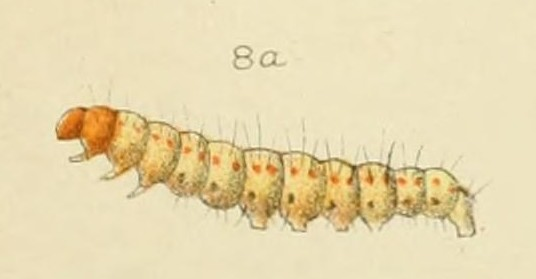
Izatha attactella larva

Hudson described the larvae of this species as being about 7/8 in. long when fully grown. The head is dark brown and shiny while the body is white. The pupa is pale ochreous in colour with a brown tinge to the head and lower portion of the pupa. It is enclosed in an oval cocoon made from silk and pieces of chewed bark.

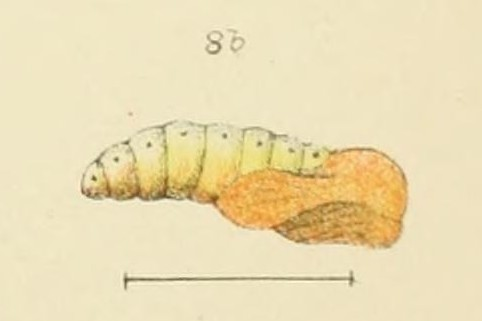
Izatha attactella pupa

Walker described the adults of the species as follows:

Male. Hoary, minutely blackish-speckled, cinereous and shining beneath. Third joint of the palpi with three blackish bands. Fore wings with a black slightly dislocated line, which is darkest and most concise towards the base, and does not extend to the tip of the wing; marginal points blackish, elongated, extending also along the exterior part of the costa; some small transverse irregular brown dots in the disk. Hind wings pale cinereous, shining. Var. — Fore wings clouded with brown. Length of the body 6 — 8 lines; of the wings 16 — 20 lines.

The wingspan 24.5–38 mm for males and 22–36 mm for females. I. attactella resembles I. voluptuosa but can be distinguished from the latter by having a narrow forewing, a paler hind wing, more obvious scale tufts and a longer dark basal streak. I. attactella is also on the wing earlier in the season in September to December with I. voluptuosa being present in the later months of November to February.

== Distribution ==
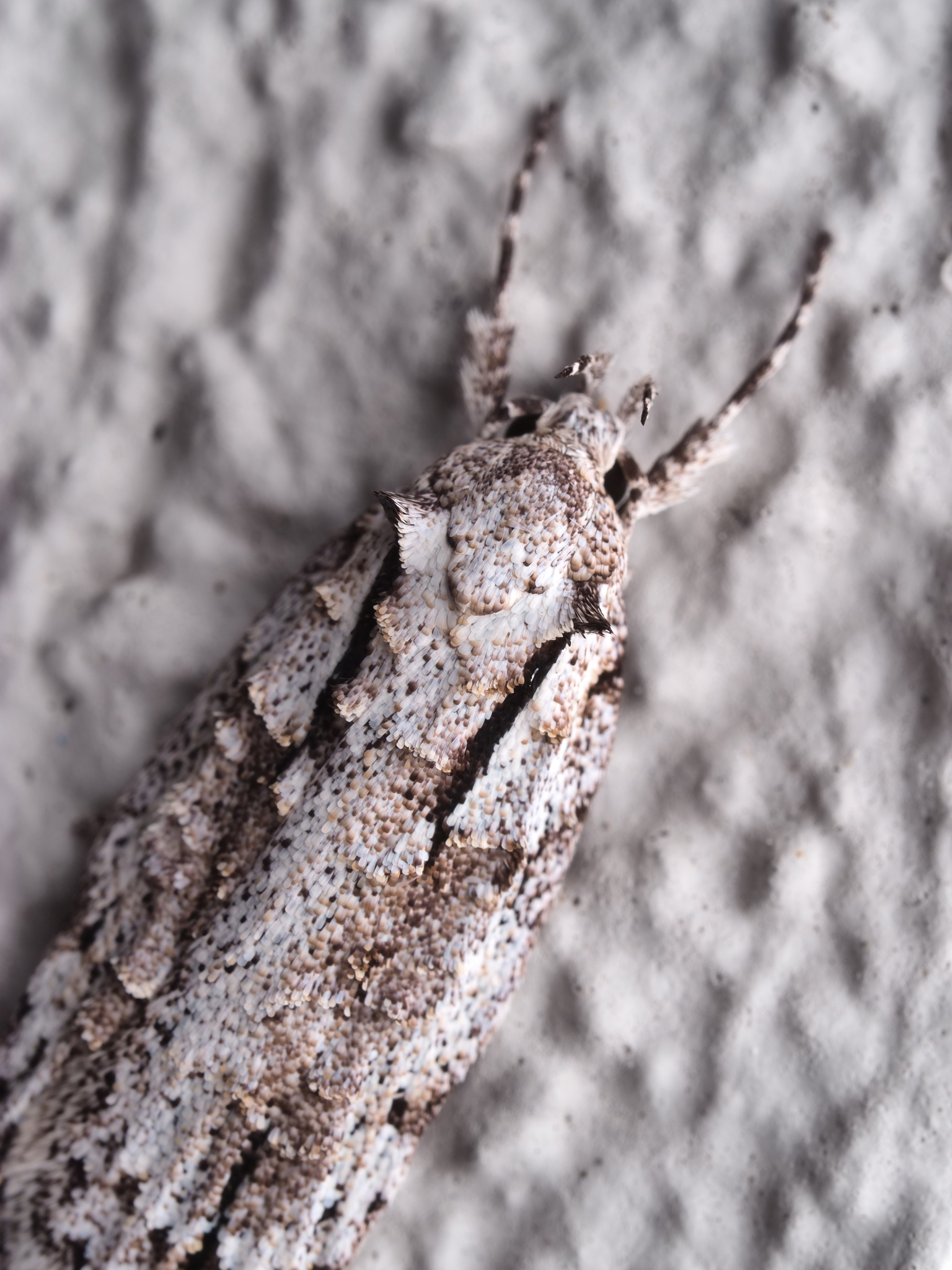
Scale tufts of I. attactella.

This species is endemic to New Zealand. I. attactella is widespread and present in both the North and South Islands but in the latter only as far as mid Canterbury. This species has been recorded in the following locations: Northland, Auckland, Coromandel, Waikato, Bay of Plenty, Taranaki, Taupo, Hawkes Bay, Rangitikei, Wellington, Marlborough Sounds, Nelson, Buller, Marlborough and mid Canterbury.

== Behaviour and life cycle ==
Pupation takes place under the bark in the above described oval silk and chewed wood cocoon. Adults are on wing from September to December. However, in the South Island occasional specimens appear in December and January. When reared in captivity in the North Island this species emerges from July onwards. This species does not come readily to light in large numbers.

== Habitat and host species ==
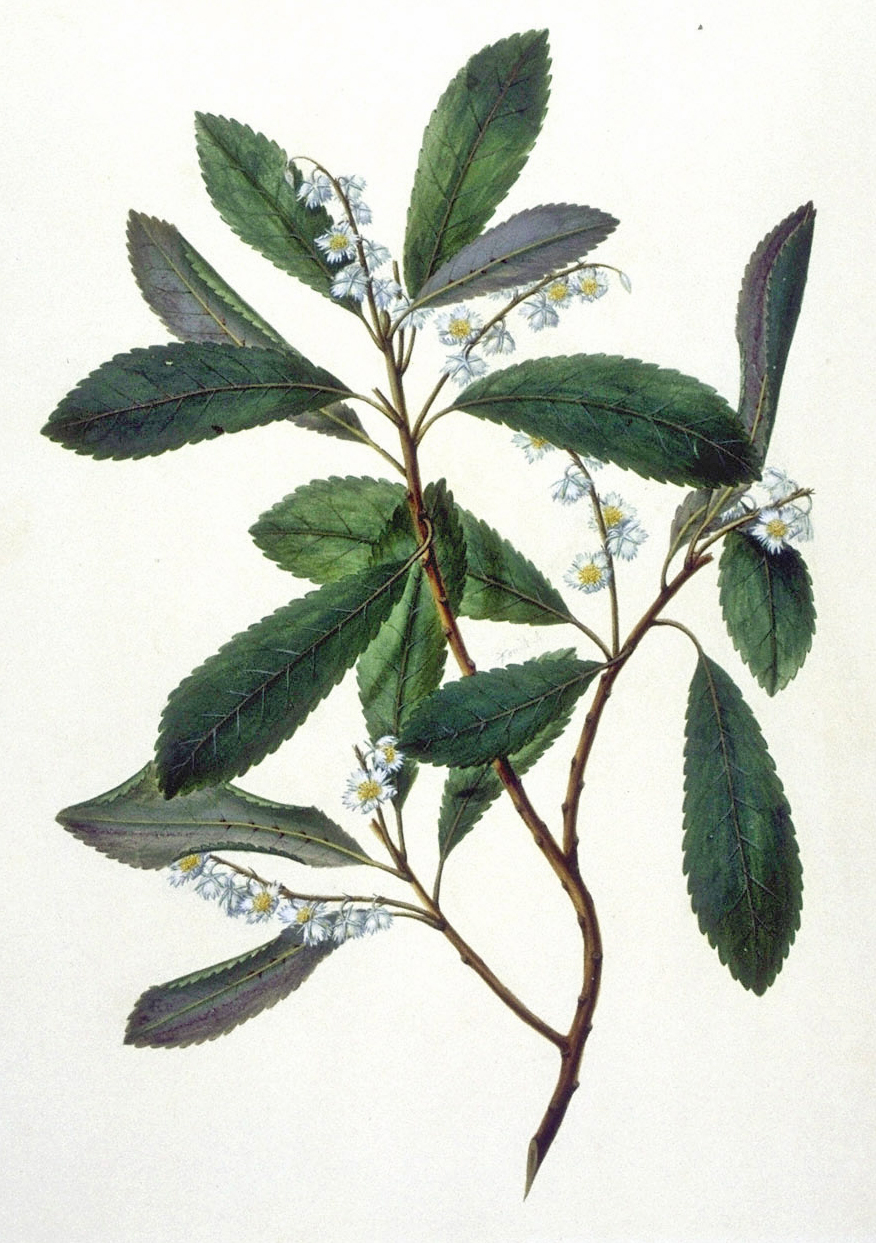
A larval host plant, Elaeocarpus dentatus

Larvae have been reported feeding under the bark of dead Elaeocarpus dentatus, Aristotelia serrata, Nothofagus, Myoporum laetum and Rhopalostylis sapida. Larvae feed on the soft inner surface of the bark. This species has also been recorded from dead wood of Castanea, Litsea calicaris, Olearia paniculata, Pinus patula, Pinus radiata and Sophora species. In Auckland, larvae have been recorded as feeding on dead rotten wood lying on the ground.
