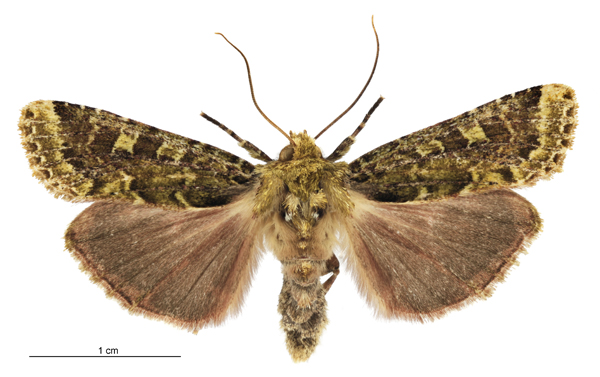
- Female
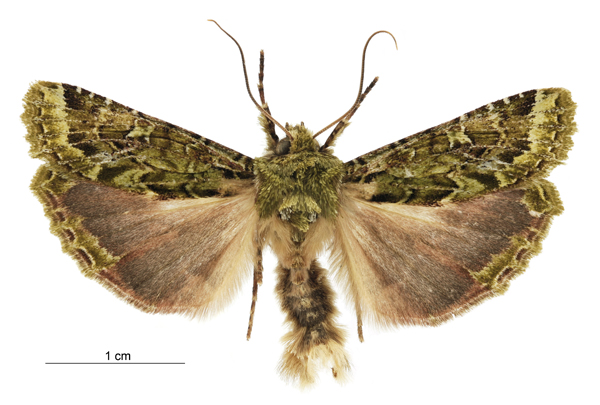
- Male

Scientific classification
- Kingdom: Animalia
- Phylum: Arthropoda
- Clade: Pancrustacea
- Class: Insecta
- Order: Lepidoptera
- Superfamily: Noctuoidea
- Family: Noctuidae
- Genus: Feredayia
- Species: F. graminosa

Binomial name
- Feredayia graminosa (Walker, 1857)
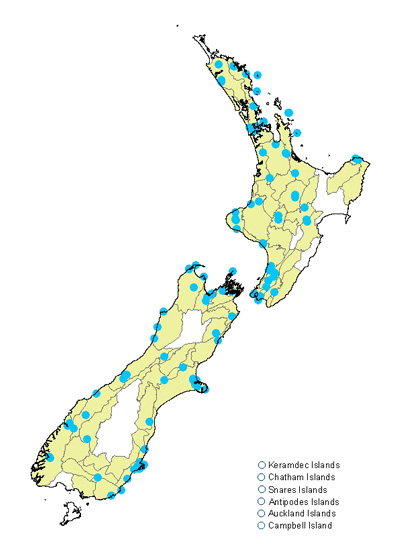

Synonyms
- Erana graminosa Walker, 1857; Erana vigens Walker, 1865; Mamestra sphagnea Felder & Rogenhofer, 1875

= Feredayia graminosa =

Species of moth endemic to New Zealand

Feredayia graminosa, the mahoe stripper, green mahoe moth or emerald cutworm moth, is a moth of the family Noctuidae. It was first described by Francis Walker in 1857. It is endemic to New Zealand and is found in the North and South Islands. The species inhabits wooded areas and coastal habitat where its larval host is common and as such are less common in the inland regions of the South Island. There were two broods per year. Eggs are laid on the larval host plant and hatch after about a week. The larvae feed on the leaves of the native mahoe tree, Melicytus ramiflorus. When ready to pupate the larvae create a delicate cocoon of silk and soil which surrounds the brown pupa just below the ground surface. Adults are on the wing all year but are most commonly observed from October to April. They are attracted to light. During the day they rest on tree trunks where their colouration helps provide protection. Adults have been collected via sugar traps and have an affinity for the flowers of white rātā. The male has a tuft of hair like scales on the underside of the forewings which generates a very strong vanilla-like scent.

== Taxonomy ==
This species was first described by Francis Walker in 1857 and originally named Erana graminosa. The type species for the genus Feredayia is Erana graminosa by original monotypy. In 1865 Walker, thinking he was describing a new species, named this moth Erana vigens. In 1887 Edward Meyrick synonymised this name with E. graminosa. In 1875 Cajetan Felder and Alois Friedrich Rogenhofer, thinking they were describing a new species, named this moth Mamestra sphagnea. In 1910 George Willis Kirkaldy placed Erana graminosa in the genus Feredayia as Erana was preoccupied by Erana Gray, 1840.

George Hudson discussed and illustrated this species under the name Erana graminosa in both his 1898 book New Zealand moths and butterflies (Macro-lepidoptera) and again in his 1928 book The butterflies and moths of New Zealand. Hudson, again in both his 1898 and 1928 publications, treated Mamestra sphagnea as a synonym of Melanchra plena. In 1988 John S. Dugdale confirmed the placement of this species in the genus Feredayia and synonymised M. sphagnea with F. graminosa. The male holotype, collected in Auckland by John Frederick Churton, is held at the Natural History Museum, London.

== Description ==
Live moth.

Hudson described the adults of this species as follows:

The expansion of the wings is about 1 1/4 inches. The fore-wings are bright green; there are three paler green transverse lines, edged with black; one near the base of the wing, one just beyond the reniform spot, and one close to the termen; this last is inwardly much clouded with dark olive-green; the reniform spot is pale green, edged with black. The hind-wings are very broad, pinkish-brown, tinged with green, on the termen. In the female the hind-wings are considerably narrower, and are not so strongly tinged with green as in the male.

Some specimens appear darker than others but other than that there is little variation in the species. The male also has noticeably enlarged rounded forewings. The male has a tuft of hair like scales on the underside of the forewings which generates a very strong vanilla-like scent.

Hudson described the egg of the species as follows:

The egg is about 1/30 inch in diameter, semi-globose, much flattened beneath, pale green, the whole surface covered with minute irregular hexagonal depressions which radiate from the micropyle.

Young larva.

Mature larva.

Hudson described the larva of this species as follows:

When first excluded from the egg the young larva is about 1/8 inch long, and of a very pale green colour. After the first moult it is bright green, darker towards the head, with white dorsal, subdorsal, and lateral lines; there are eight rows of shining black spots, each spot emitting a number of stout black bristles; the head is yellowish-brown with a few black dots. After the last moult the larva has a totally different appearance. It is pale green, marbled with darker green; there is often a whitish lateral line, and a series of dark green, or blackish, spots on the sides of each segment; the whole larva is also considerably speckled with black. Sometimes the larva has a pinkish-brown tinge and there are often two or three rows of pale spots. In fact the full-grown caterpillar is very variable.

When ready to pupate the larvae create a delicate cocoon of silk and soil just below the ground surface. The pupa is brown coloured.

== Distribution ==
This species is endemic to New Zealand and is found throughout the North and South Islands where its larval host plant is prevalent.

== Habitat and hosts ==
This species inhabits heavily wooded and coastal habitat where its larval host plant is common. The larvae feed on the leaves of the native mahoe tree, Melicytus ramiflorus. This species is less common in the inland regions of the South Island, including the Mackenzie Country and Central Otago regions.

== Life history and behaviour ==
F. graminosa camouflaged against moss.

Eggs are laid on the larval host plant and hatch after about a week. Larvae hatch from eggs in August and are fully grown by October. The larvae feed at night and during the day conceal themselves in crevices in the bark of their host plant.

Mature larvae are sluggish and rest on the moss-covered stems of its food plant where its colouration and appearance provides protective camouflage. Mature larvae hibernate during the winter months, often hiding themselves in the burrows which have been made in the stems of their host plant by other wood-boring insect species. They pupate by burying themselves in the earth underneath their host plant. In 1945 Hudson reared this species and confirmed there were two broods per year.

Adults are on the wing all year but are most commonly observed from October to April. Adults are attracted to light. During the day they rest on tree trunks where their colouration helps provide protection. Adults have been collected via sugar traps and have an affinity for the flowers of white rātā.

== Parasitoids ==
Feredayia graminosa is a known host of species within the fly genus Pales.

== Gallery ==
Illustration of young larva.

Illustration of fully grown larva.

Illustration of male.

Illustration of female.
