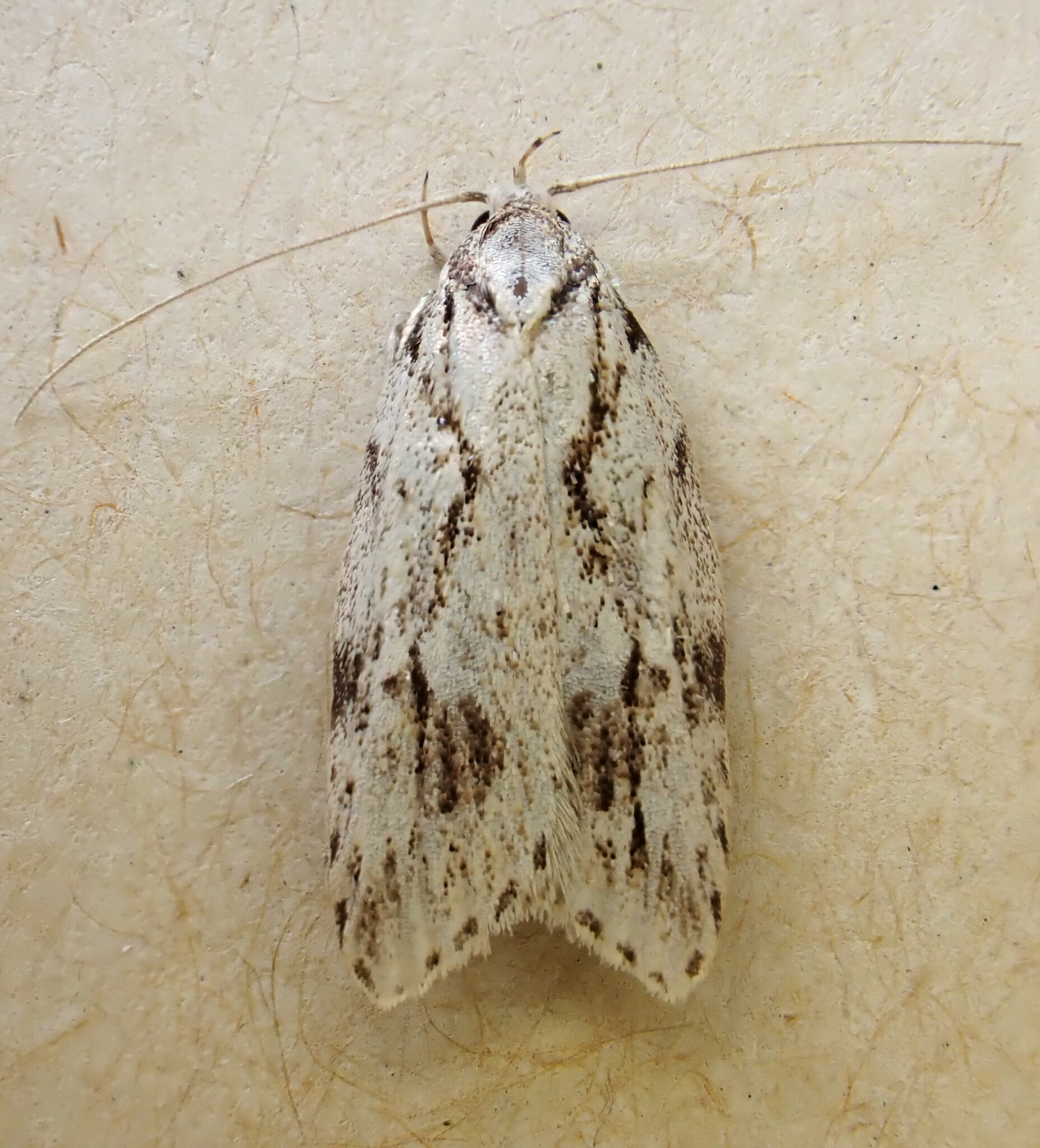

Scientific classification
- Kingdom: Animalia
- Phylum: Arthropoda
- Class: Insecta
- Order: Lepidoptera
- Family: Oecophoridae
- Genus: Izatha
- Species: I. blepharidota

Binomial name
- Izatha blepharidota Hoare, 2010

= Izatha blepharidota =

Species of moth endemic to New Zealand

Izatha blepharidota is a moth of the family Oecophoridae. This species was first described in 2010 by Robert J. B. Hoare. It is endemic to New Zealand, where it can be found in the northern half of the North Island. Larvae have been collected in October and have been reared on Pseudopanax crassifolius, Ripogonum scandens, Coriaria arborea and Kunzea ericoides. Adults are on the wing from November to April.

== Taxonomy ==
This species was first described by Robert J. B. Hoare in 2010. The male holotype specimen was collected by Hoare at Mount William in Auckland and is held at the New Zealand Arthropod Collection.

== Description ==
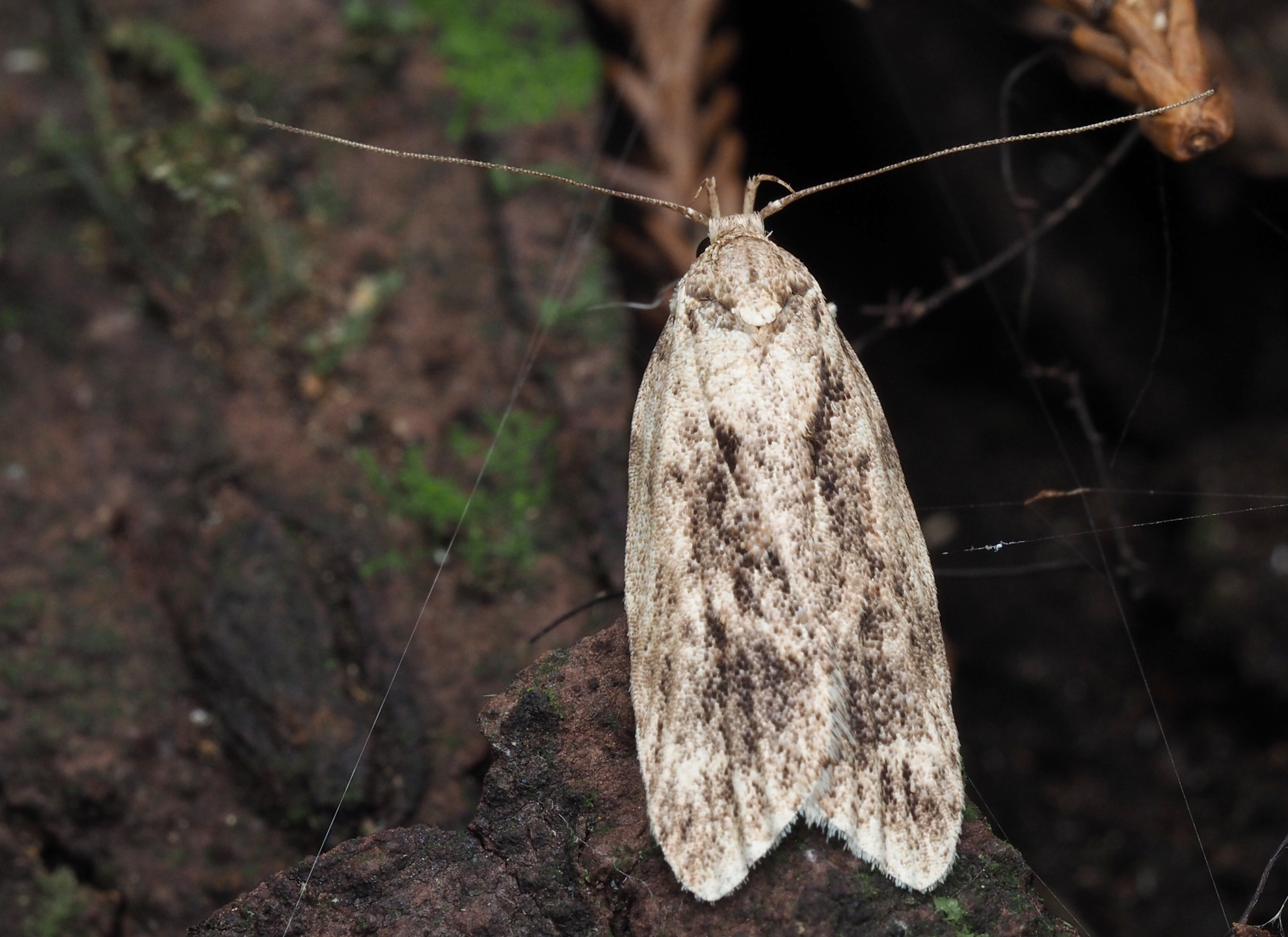
I. blepharidota in the wild.

The wingspan is 22.5–26 mm for males and 23–29 mm for females. I. blepharidota has a pale brownish white ground colour with dark brown markings.

This species can be confused with I. balanophora however I. balanophora has a long dark stripe along the front edge of the forewing where as I. blepharidota has a smaller mark. Females of I. blepharidota can sometimes be confused with I. voluptuosa but the latter species has a darker ground colour and veins which are not as dark nor well defined as the former species.

As at 2010 the larvae of this species has not yet been scientifically described but have been collected in October, raised with adults emerging between November and January.

== Distribution ==
This species is endemic to New Zealand. It can be found in the northern half of the North Island in the regions of Auckland, Coromandel, Bay of Plenty and Gisbourne.

== Host species ==
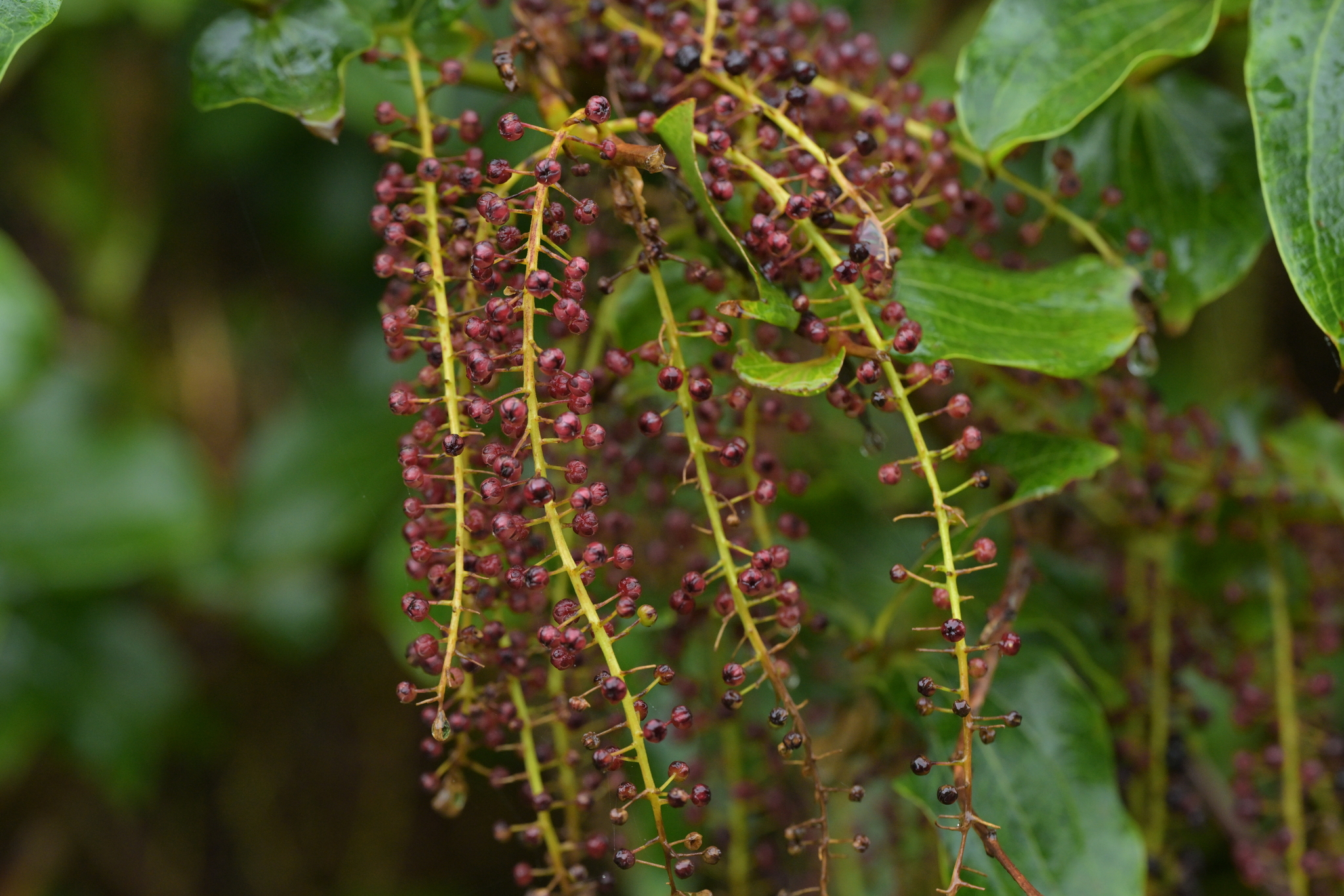
Larval host plant Coriaria arborea.

Larvae have been reared on dead or decaying wood of the species Pseudopanax crassifolius, Ripogonum scandens, Coriaria arborea and Kunzea ericoides.

== Behaviour ==
Adults are on wing from November to April with Hoare noting that many specimens were collected during the months of November and January. He hypothesised that as a result of this that there are two emergence times for the adults of this species rather than two broods.
