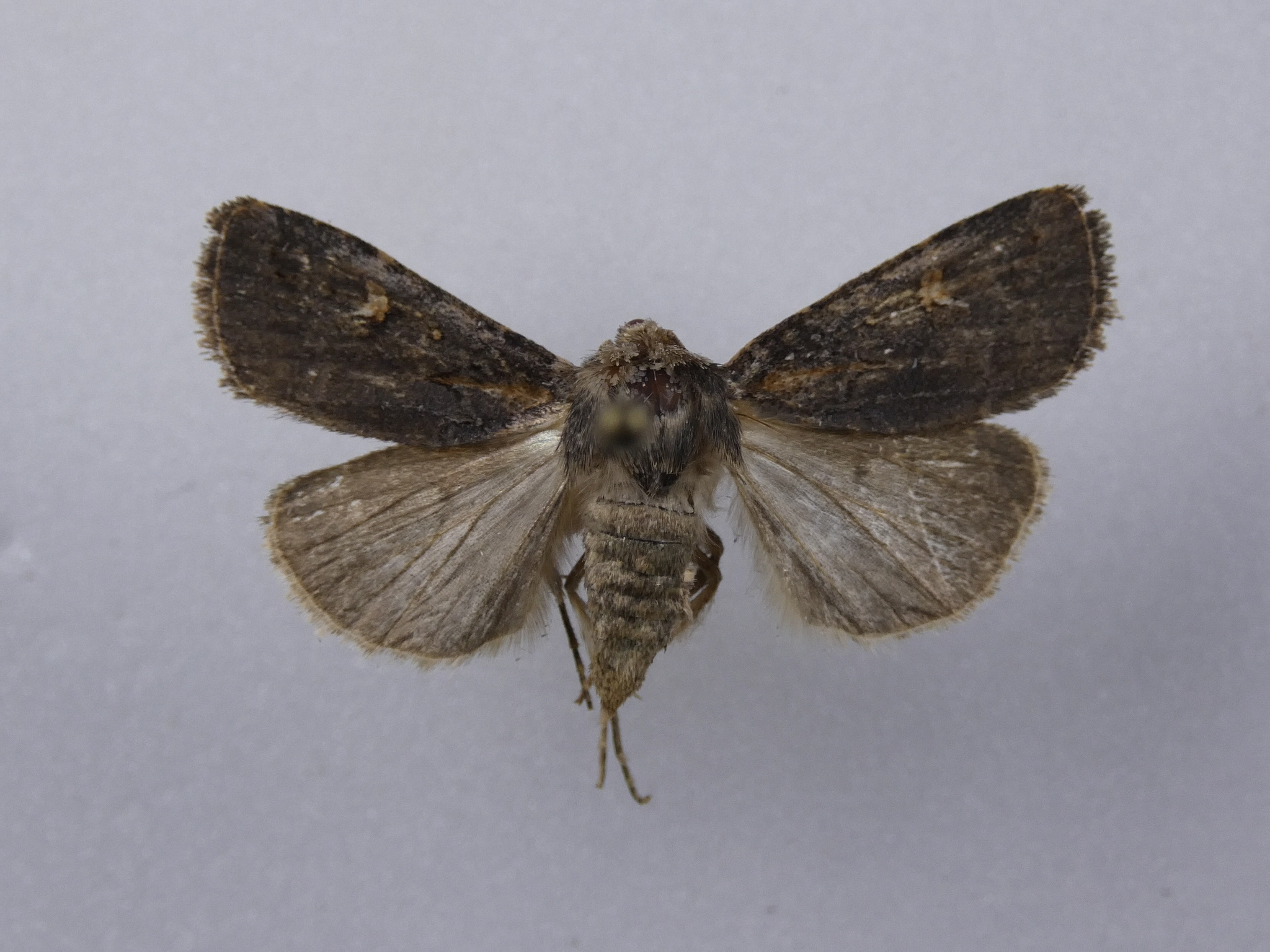

Scientific classification
- Kingdom: Animalia
- Phylum: Arthropoda
- Clade: Pancrustacea
- Class: Insecta
- Order: Lepidoptera
- Superfamily: Noctuoidea
- Family: Noctuidae
- Genus: Proteuxoa
- Species: P. tetronycha

Binomial name
- Proteuxoa tetronycha Hoare, 2017

= Proteuxoa tetronycha =

Species of moth

Proteuxoa tetronycha is a moth of the family Noctuidae. It is endemic, and can be found throughout, New Zealand. This species was previously muddled up with the rarer Proteuxoa comma and is very similar in appearance to that other species. P. tetronycha can be distinguished from P. comma by the paler colour of its prothorax as well as the browner base colour of its forewings. P. tetronycha is also a smaller moth with the wingspan of the adults of this species being between 29 and 33 mm. There are also differences between the females of these two species. For the females of P. tetronycha, their ovipositor (the tubular organ through which the female moth lays her eggs) is lacking the spiny hair like structures that are present on the ovipositor of P. comma. Larvae likely feed on a variety of host species and have been raised on Acaena species as well as Poa cita. The adults of this species are on the wing from September to March and are attracted to light.

== Taxonomy ==
This species was first described by Robert J. B. Hoare in 2017. This species was previously muddled up with the rarer P. comma. The female holotype was collected at Taupō by J. S. Armstrong and is held in the New Zealand Arthropod Collection.

== Description ==
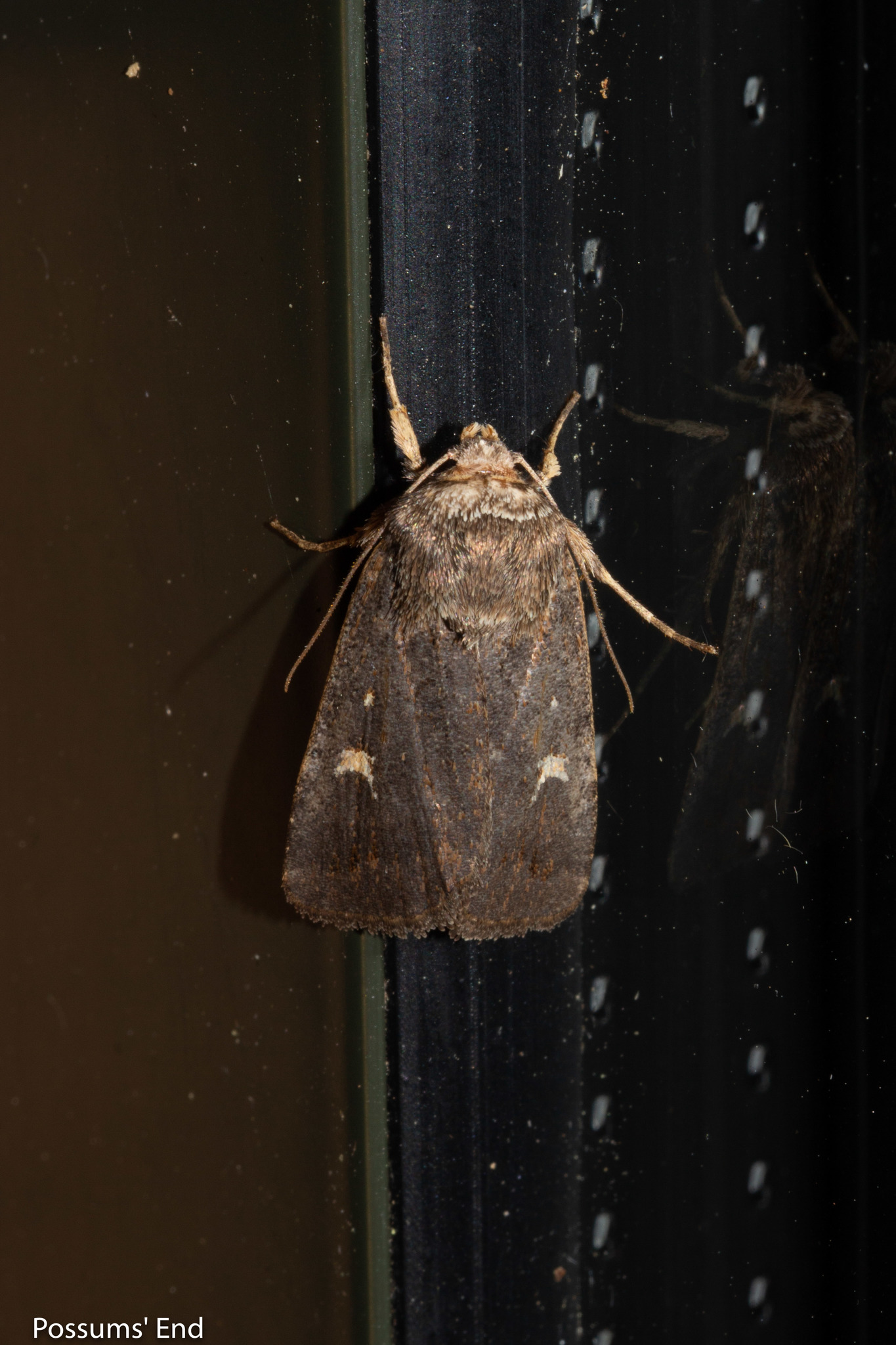
Proteuxoa tetronycha, observation confirmed by Robert Hoare.

The wingspan of the adults of this species is between 29 and 33 mm. P. tetronycha is very similar in appearance to P. comma. P. tetronycha can be distinguished from P. comma by the paler colour of its prothorax as well as the browner base colour of its forewings. There are also differences between the females of these two species. For the females of P. tetronycha, their ovipositor (the tubular organ through which the female moth lays her eggs) is lacking the spiny hair like structures that are present on the ovipositor of P. comma.

== Distribution ==
It is endemic to New Zealand. This species can be found throughout New Zealand, although as at 2017 it is not known from the Chatham Islands.

== Behaviour ==
Adults of the species are on the wing from September to March. The adult moths are attracted to light.

== Life history and host species ==
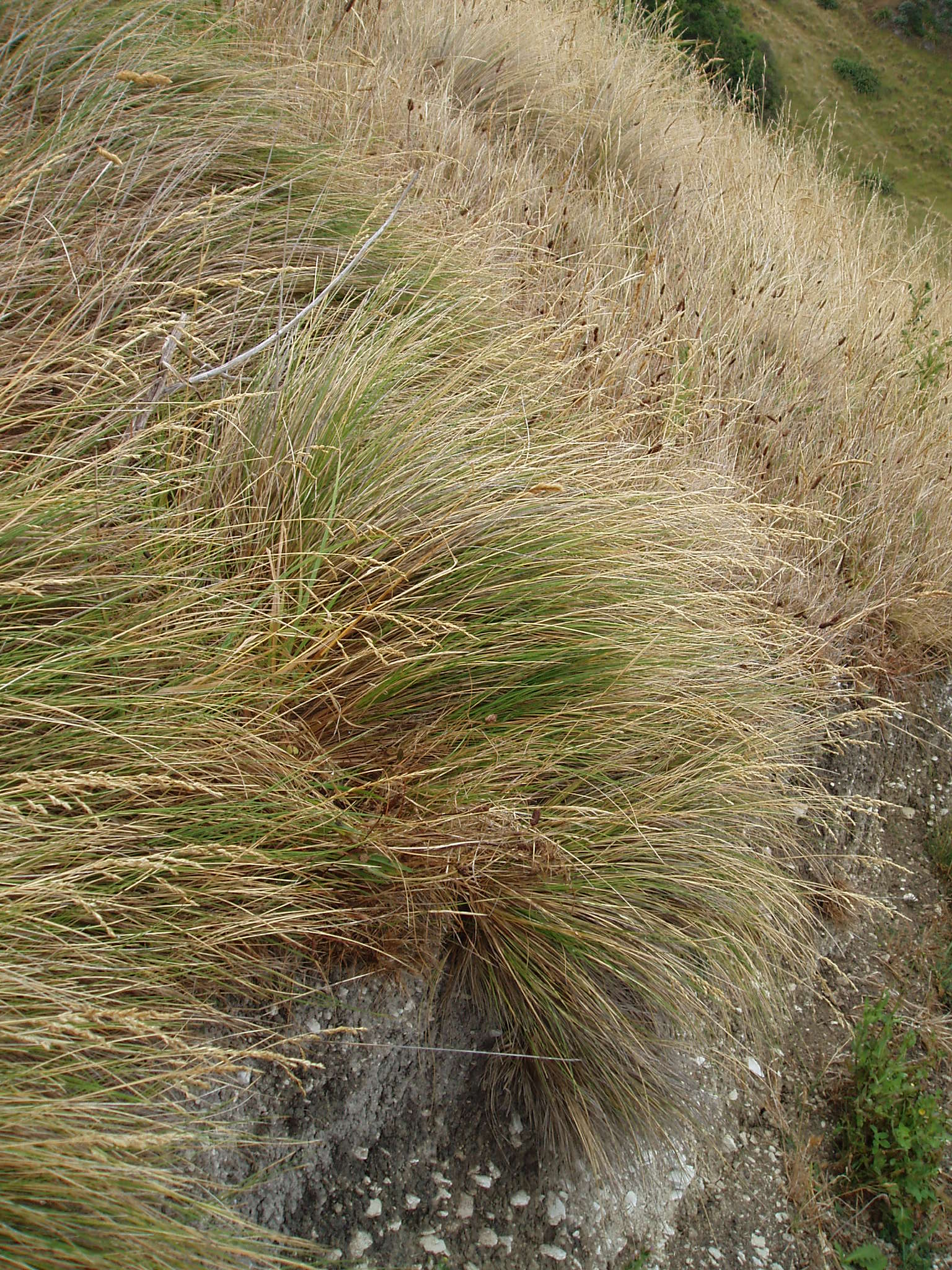
Poa cita, used to rear P. tetronycha larvae.

The larvae of this species are likely to feed on a variety of host species. However, as a result of this species being long confused with P. comma, records of host species are intermingled with the latter species. It is known that this species has been reared on piripiri (Acaena anserinifolia) as well as Poa cita.
