= Leioproctus muelleri =

Scientific classification
- Kingdom: Animalia
- Phylum: Arthropoda
- Clade: Pancrustacea
- Class: Insecta
- Order: Hymenoptera
- Family: Colletidae
- Genus: Leioproctus
- Species: L. muelleri

Binomial name
- Leioproctus muelleri (Houston & Maynard) 2012

Synonyms
- Ottocolletes muelleri Houston & Maynard, 2012

Species of bee

Leioproctus muelleri, or Leioproctus (Ottocolletes) muelleri, is a species of bee in the family Colletidae and subfamily Colletinae. It is endemic to Australia. It was described by Australian entomologists Terry Houston and Glynn Maynard in 2012.

== Distribution and habitat ==
The species occurs in south-west Western Australia. The type locality is Anstey Road bushland, Forrestdale, Perth.

== Behaviour ==
The adults are flying mellivores.
