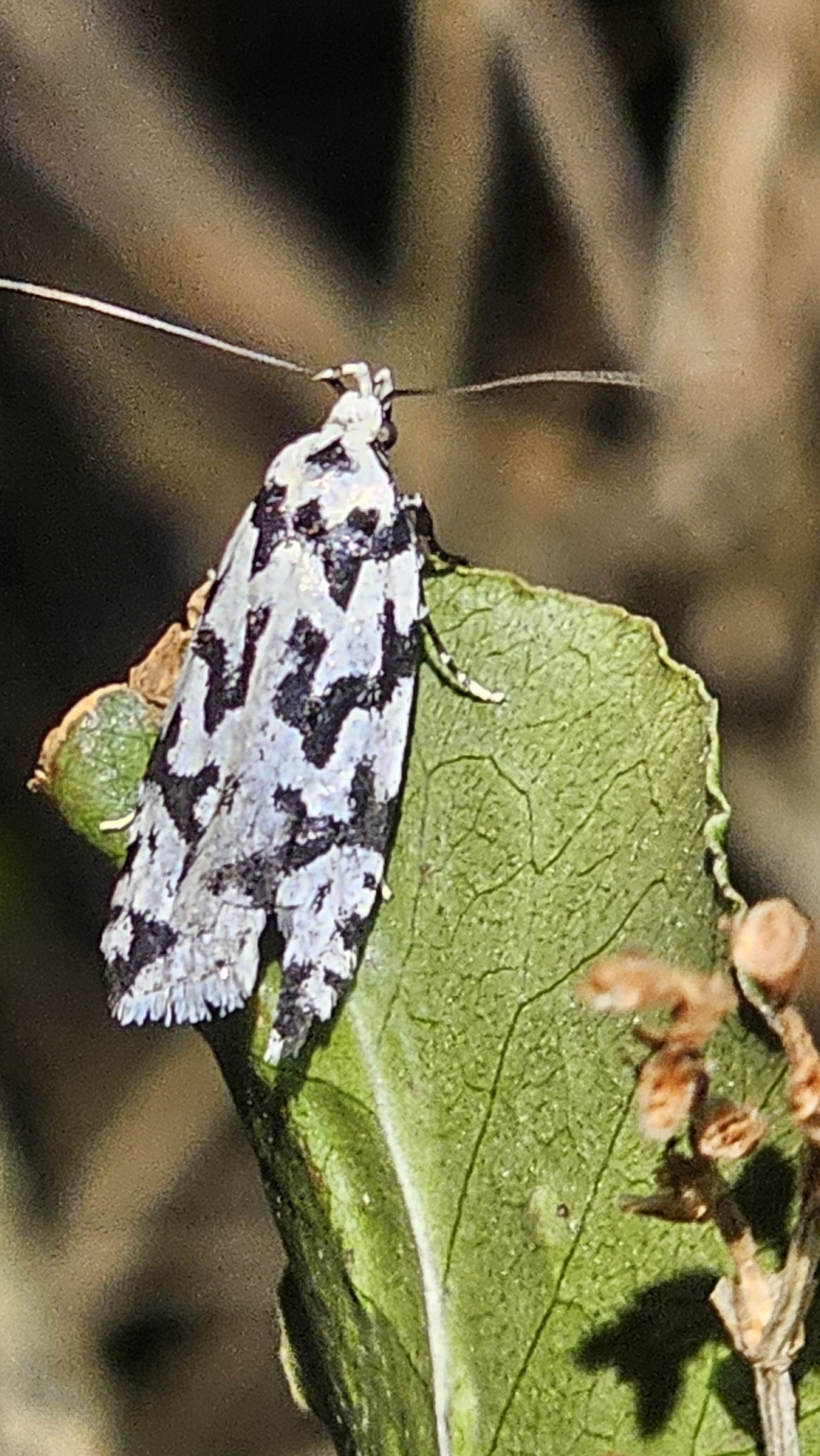

Scientific classification
- Kingdom: Animalia
- Phylum: Arthropoda
- Clade: Pancrustacea
- Class: Insecta
- Order: Lepidoptera
- Family: Oecophoridae
- Genus: Izatha
- Species: I. picarella

Binomial name
- Izatha picarella (Walker, 1864)

Synonyms
- Oecophora picarella Walker, 1864; Psecadia teras Felder & Rogenhofer, 1875; Izatha teras (Felder & Rogenhofer, 1875)

= Izatha picarella =

Species of moth

Izatha picarella is a moth of the family Oecophoridae. It is endemic to New Zealand, where it is known from the Nelson and Marlborough districts of the northern South Island.

This species was first described by Francis Walker in 1864.

The wingspan is 22.5–28.5 mm for males and 20.5–28 mm for females. Adults are on wing from September to January. They are attracted to light and have been collected via a mercury vapour light trap.

Larvae have been reared from dead wood of apple (probably Malus domesticus) and from dead branches of Melicytus ramiflorus.
