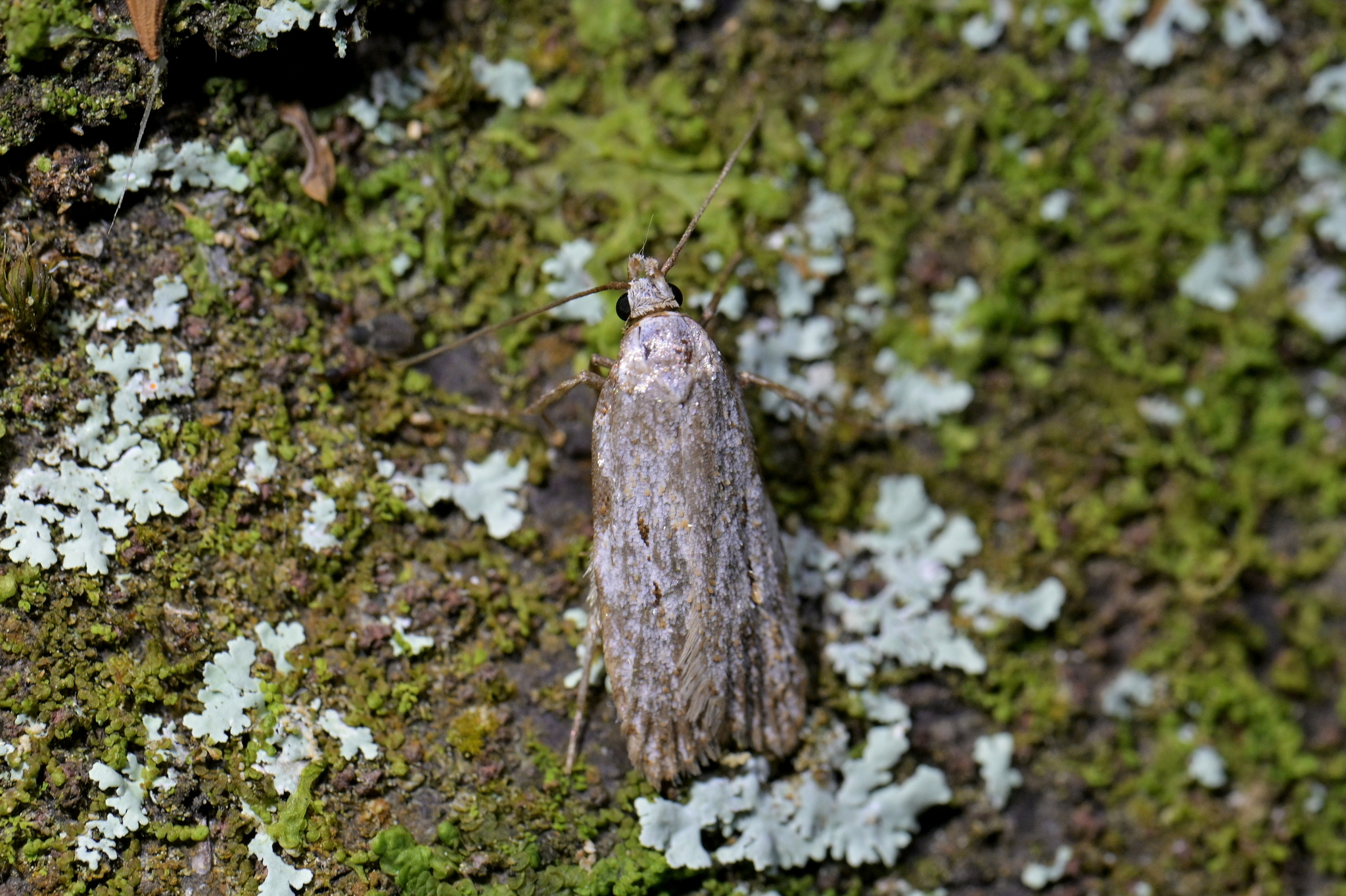

Scientific classification
- Domain: Eukaryota
- Kingdom: Animalia
- Phylum: Arthropoda
- Class: Insecta
- Order: Lepidoptera
- Family: Oecophoridae
- Genus: Izatha
- Species: I. balanophora

Binomial name
- Izatha balanophora (Meyrick, 1897)

Synonyms
- Semiocosma balanophora Meyrick, 1897; Izatha milligani Philpott, 1927

= Izatha balanophora =

Species of moth

Izatha balanophora is a moth of the family Oecophoridae. It is endemic to New Zealand, where it is widespread in the North Island. Larvae live off the dead bark of kānuka. The adult moths are on the wing during December to March. This species only occasionally comes to light.

== Taxonomy ==
This species was first described by Edward Meyrick in 1897 using a specimen collected by George Hudson in Wellington and named Semiocosma balanophora. The holotype specimen is held at the Natural History Museum, London. Meyrick placed this species in the genus Izatha in 1915. Alfred Philpott, thinking he was describing a new species, named the moth Izatha milligani in 1927. The holotype specimen Philpott used is held at the New Zealand Arthropod Collection. This name was synonymised by George Hudson when he discussed and illustrated this species in 1939.

== Description ==
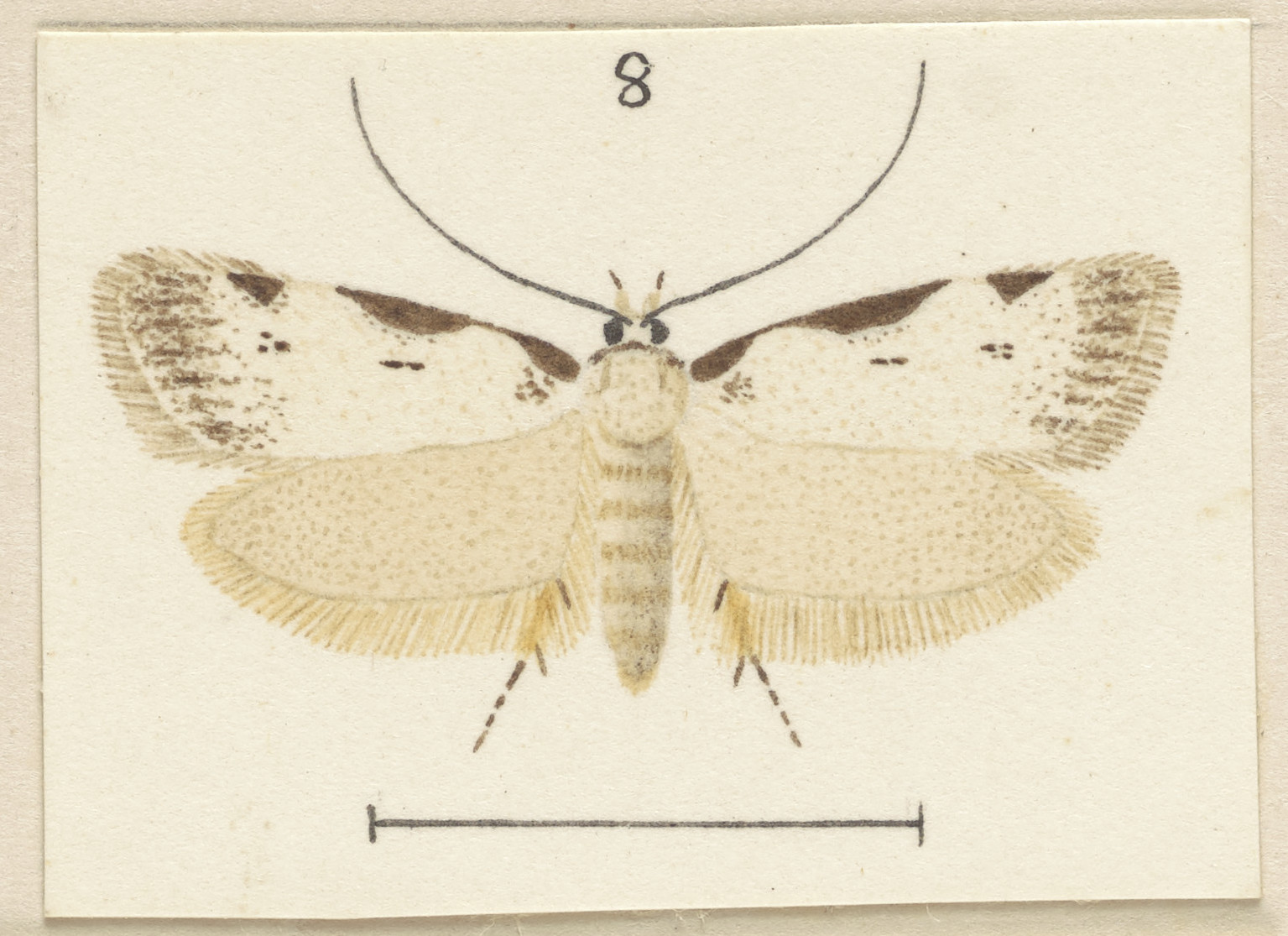
Watercolour by George Hudson c. 1927

Meyrick described the species as follows:

♂ 21 mm. Head and thorax white, with a few dark fuscous scales, shoulders narrowly dark fuscous. Palpi white, basal half and a subapical ring of second joint, and median baud of terminal joint dark fuscous. Forewings elongate, moderate, costa moderately arched, apex obtuse, termen obliquely rounded; white, with a few fuscous and dark fuscous scales; elongate dark fuscous marks along costa at base, before middle, and beyond middle; stigmata fuscous mixed with black, plical obliquely before first discal, a minute black dot between first and second discal; obscure indications of an angulated fuscous shade before termen; a terminal series of undefined dark fuscous dots: cilia whitish sprinkled with fuscous. Hindwings whitish-fuscous.

The wingspan is 19.5–27 mm for males and 23.5–31 mm for females. Pale specimens of I. balanophora can be confused with I. blepharidota however I. balanophora always has a wider an elongate dark patch along the forewing costa in comparison the narrow dash of I. blepharidota. This species could also be confused with weakly marked I. mesoschista and I. haumu but it lacks the curved black line in the forewing disc of the other two species.

== Distribution ==
This species is endemic to New Zealand. I. balanophora is widespread through the North Island but is regarded as uncommon. The species is likely under recorded. It has been recorded Northland, Auckland, Waikato, Taranaki, Taupo, Rangitikei and Wellington districts. Although Hudson gave records of specimens from the South Island Robert J. B. Hoare hypothesised that these are likely I. manubriata.

== Biology and behaviour ==
Adults are on wing from December to March. This species occasionally comes to light.

== Habitat and hosts ==
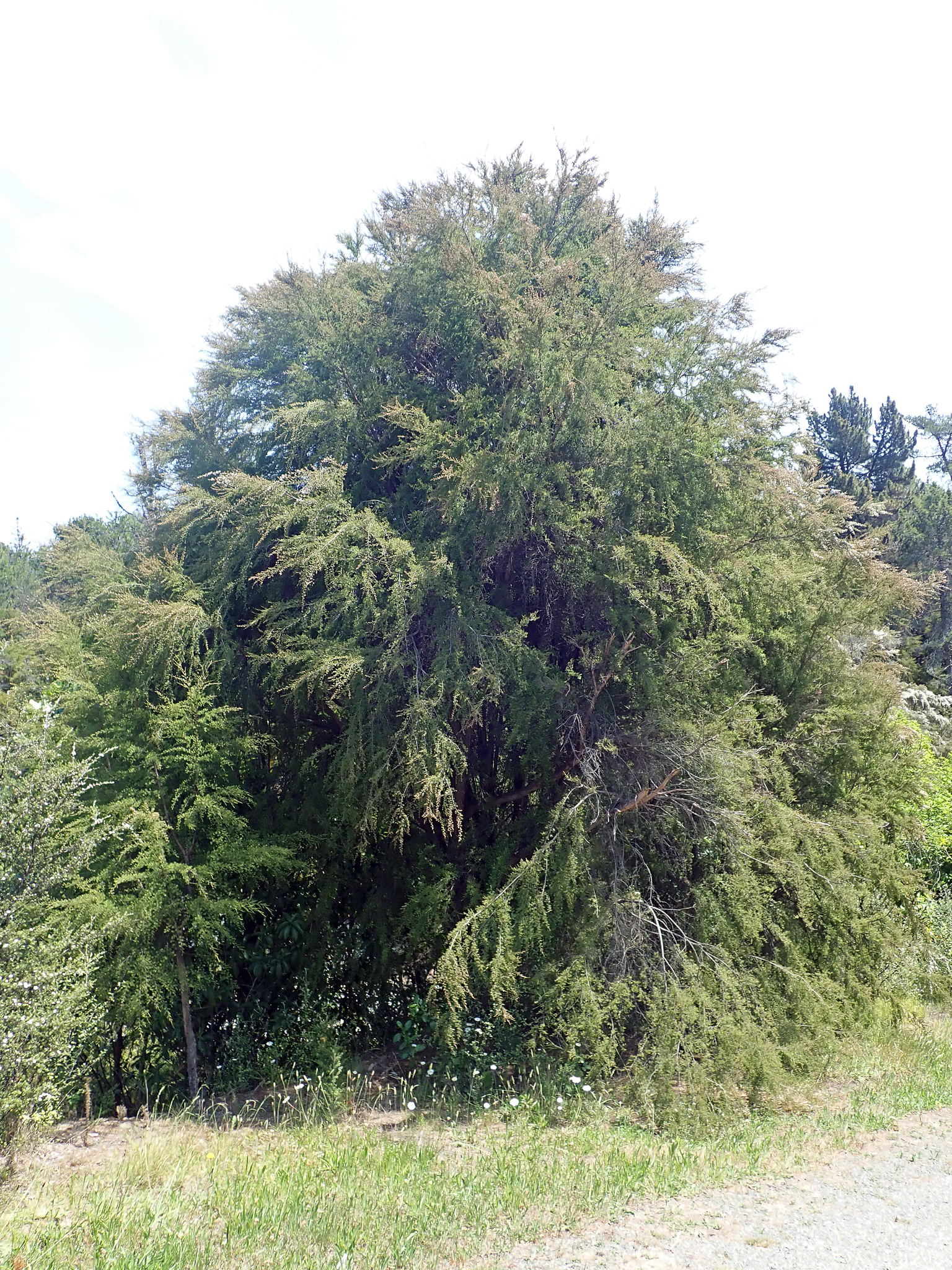
Larval host plant Kunzea ericoides.

Larvae have been reared from dead Kunzea ericoides and from an unidentified rotten log on the ground.
