= St George's Bay, Auckland =

Waterfront feature in Auckland, New Zealand

St George's Bay
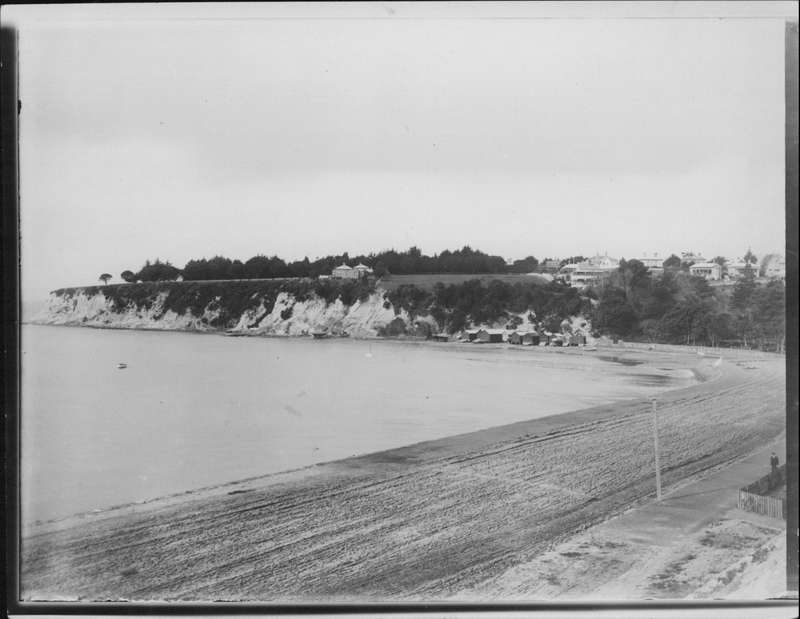
- A view of St. Georges Bay and Campbell Point in the 1900s
- Interactive map of St George's Bay
- Location: Auckland Region, New Zealand
- Coordinates: 36.8494°S 174.7817°E
- Ocean/sea sources: Waitematā Harbour

St George's Bay (Māori: Te Wai o Taikehu) is a reclaimed bay on the southern side of the Waitematā Harbour that was one of the inner city bays.

It was framed by two substantial headlands, Points Dunlop and Barnabas separating it from Mechanics Bay in the west, and Campbell's Point, after John Logan Campbell, separating it from Judge's Bay on the east. Point Dunlop and Point Barnabas have since been quarried away entirely, and Campbell's Point partially.

This was originally known as Cooper’s Bay, after the first Colonial Treasurer, George Cooper, then George’s Bay, and finally St George’s Bay. St George’s Bay Road led down to the shoreline where remnants of the early cliff survive. The Māori name for the area is Waiataikehu or Waiakehu, ‘waters of Taikehu’. Taikehu is the ancestor for the ancient Ngāi Tai tribe. St George’s Bay was cut off from the sea in 1920 and then reclaimed.
