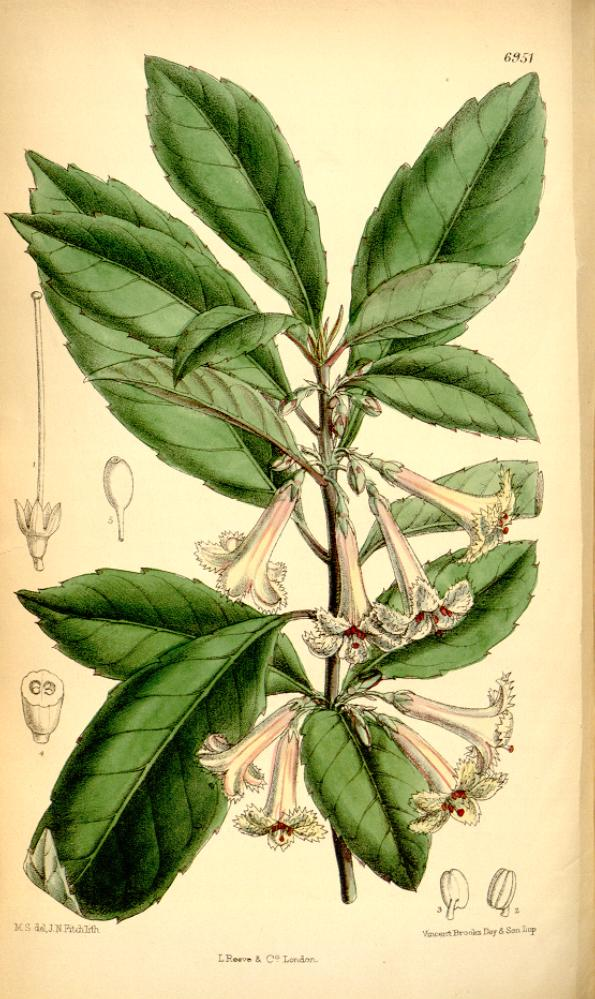

Scientific classification
- Kingdom: Plantae
- Clade: Tracheophytes
- Clade: Angiosperms
- Clade: Eudicots
- Clade: Asterids
- Order: Asterales
- Family: Alseuosmiaceae
- Genus: Alseuosmia
- Species: A. macrophylla

Binomial name
- Alseuosmia macrophylla A.Cunn.

= Alseuosmia macrophylla =

Species of flowering plant

Alseuosmia macrophylla, the toropapa or karapapa, is a plant species in the family Alseuosmiaceae. This is a small evergreen shrub which is endemic to New Zealand, along with two closely related species. An example occurrence of A. macrophylla is in the North Island habitat of the Hamilton Ecological District, where Blechnum discolor and Blechnum filiforme are understory elements with Nothofagus truncata and rimu overstory. This plant is known for the pleasant scent of its flowers, and its family name translates as "perfumed grove". The small red berries of toropapa are edible and sweet tasting. As a forest understory plant, toropapa will not tolerate full sunlight or frost, and needs its roots to stay moist and cool, however so long as these conditions are met it is reasonably hardy, and is sometimes cultivated as a garden plant.
