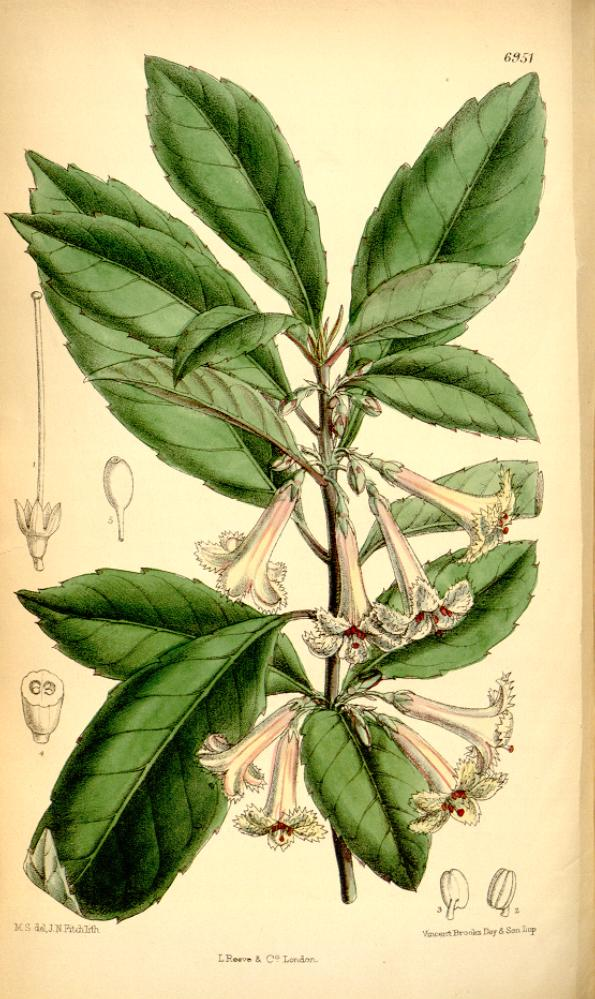
- Alseuosmia macrophylla

Scientific classification
- Kingdom: Plantae
- Clade: Embryophytes
- Clade: Tracheophytes
- Clade: Angiosperms
- Clade: Eudicots
- Clade: Asterids
- Order: Asterales
- Family: Alseuosmiaceae
- Genus: Alseuosmia; A.Cunn.

Synonyms
- Fagoides Banks & Sol. ex A.Cunn.

= Alseuosmia =

Genus of flowering plants

Alseuosmia is a genus of five species of flowering plants in the family Alseuosmiaceae, growing in New Zealand's North Island and in the northern parts of the South Island. Species members are characteristically small evergreen shrubs. An example occurrence of species representative Alseuosmia macrophylla is in the habitat of the Hamilton Ecological District, where Blechnum discolor and B. filiforme are understory elements with a Nothofagus truncata and Dacrydium cupressinum overstory.

Alseuosmia was first described in 1839 from specimens collected in Northland forests by Cunningham. Other species are A. banksii, A. pusilla, A. quercifolia, and A. turneri.

A. quercifolia is the most common of the species in lowland native forest of Waikato, sometimes known as A. Hakarimata. It is an endemic shrub, found north of 38°05’S, up to 2.5 m (8 ft 2 in) tall, though usually under 1 m (3 ft 3 in). It has red or pink flowers of 5 petals, clustered at base of leaves, giving a strong scent.
