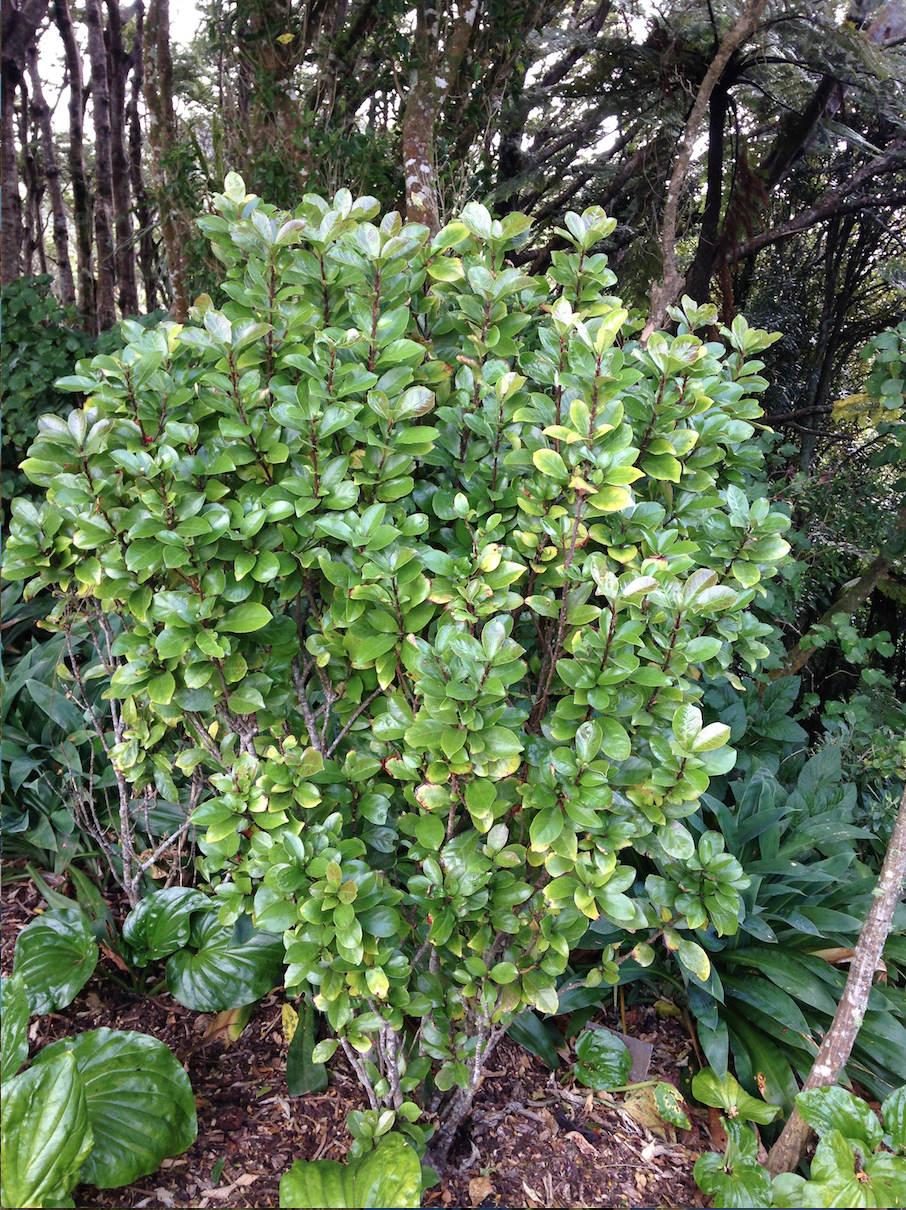

Scientific classification
- Kingdom: Plantae
- Clade: Tracheophytes
- Clade: Angiosperms
- Clade: Eudicots
- Clade: Asterids
- Order: Asterales
- Family: Alseuosmiaceae
- Genus: Alseuosmia
- Species: A. quercifolia

Binomial name
- Alseuosmia quercifolia A.Cunn.
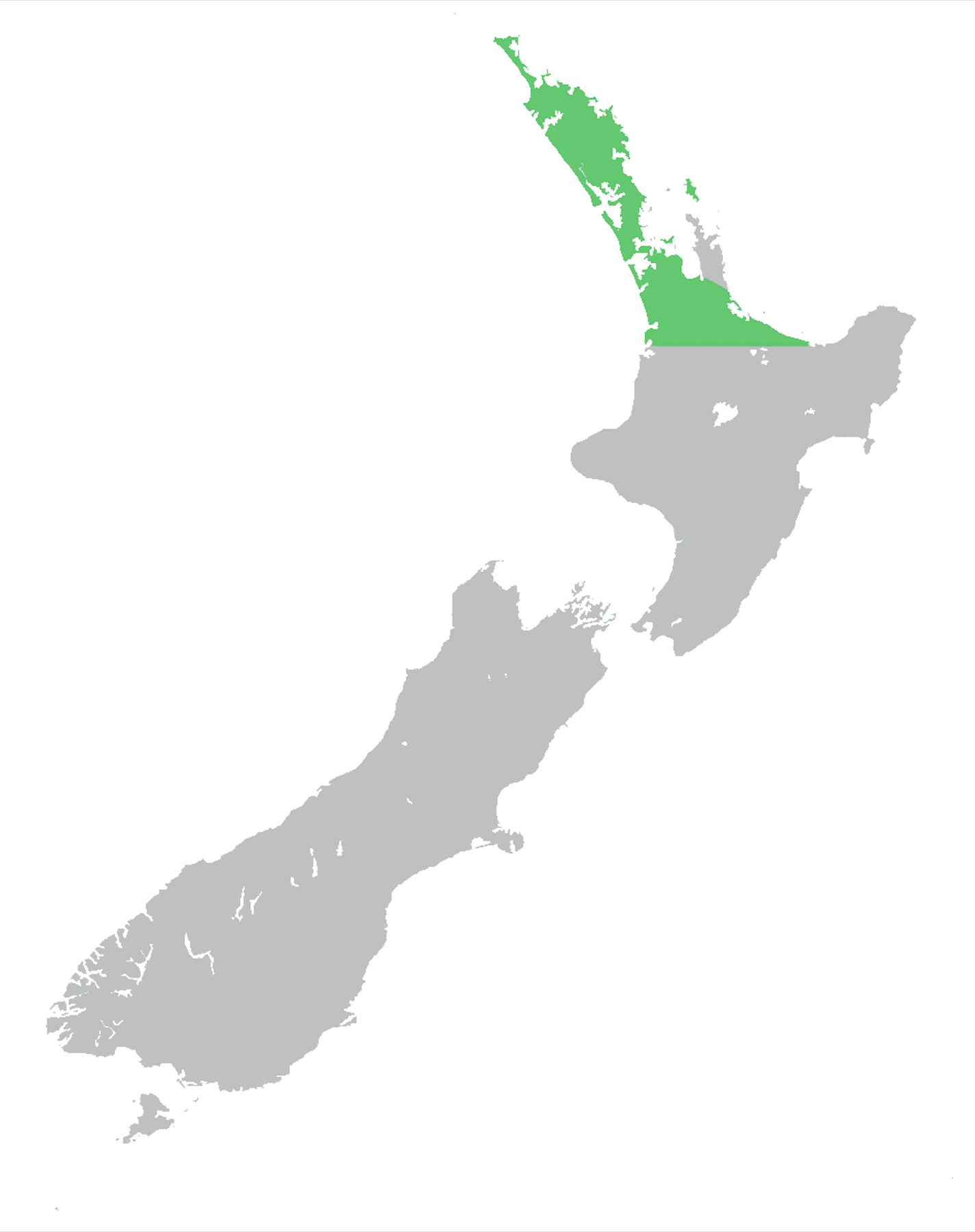
- Estimated range

Synonyms
- A. ilex A.Cunn.; A. xquercifolia A.Cunn.

= Alseuosmia quercifolia =

Species of plant

Alseuosmia quercifolia, commonly known as oak-leaved toropapa, toropapa, and karapapa (Māori), is a species of plant in the family Alseuosmiaceae. It grows as a shrub, reaching a height of 2.5 m, and has variably shaped glossy green leaves. Flowering begins in spring (in the southern hemisphere), producing fragrant pink flowers which become red berries in Autumn. Endemic to New Zealand, it is found only in the upper half of the North Island - predominately in the Waikato region.

Currently classified as "Not threatened" by the NZTCS, it was first described in 1839 by Allan Cunningham, before being demoted to a hybrid by Rhys Gardner in 1978 and then reinstated by M. F. Merrett and B. D. Clarkson in 2000.

== Description ==
Alseuosmia quercifolia is a shrub which reaches a height of 2.5 m. It has reddish brown branches with new growth a crimson colour. It has bright green glossy leaves suspended off of 1 cm long brown petioles. The leaf shape, however, varies a large amount between different plants. Flowering from September to October, it produces 2 - 6 flowers on each inflorescence which contain both the male and female parts. The flowers are a creamy-white pink colour (colour varies) and are very fragrant, containing a 5-lobed Calyx with a protruding 11 mm long corola tube. The ellipsoid plum-red 2.8 - 9.7 mm long fruit mature in Autumn, though fruiting occurs from March until May. Each fruit has 1 - 17 seeds with a mean of 6 and an average mass of 0.19g.

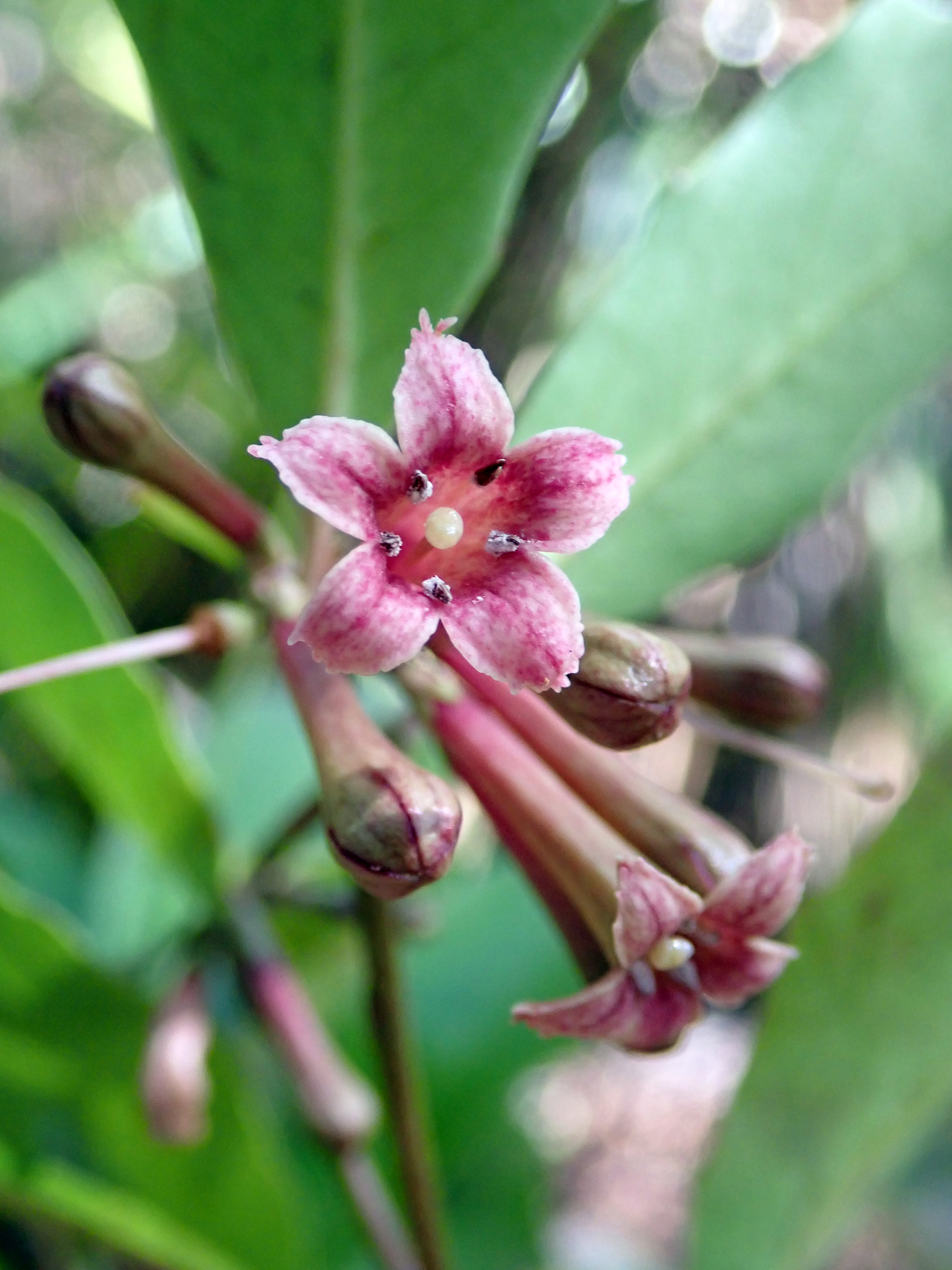
The flowers

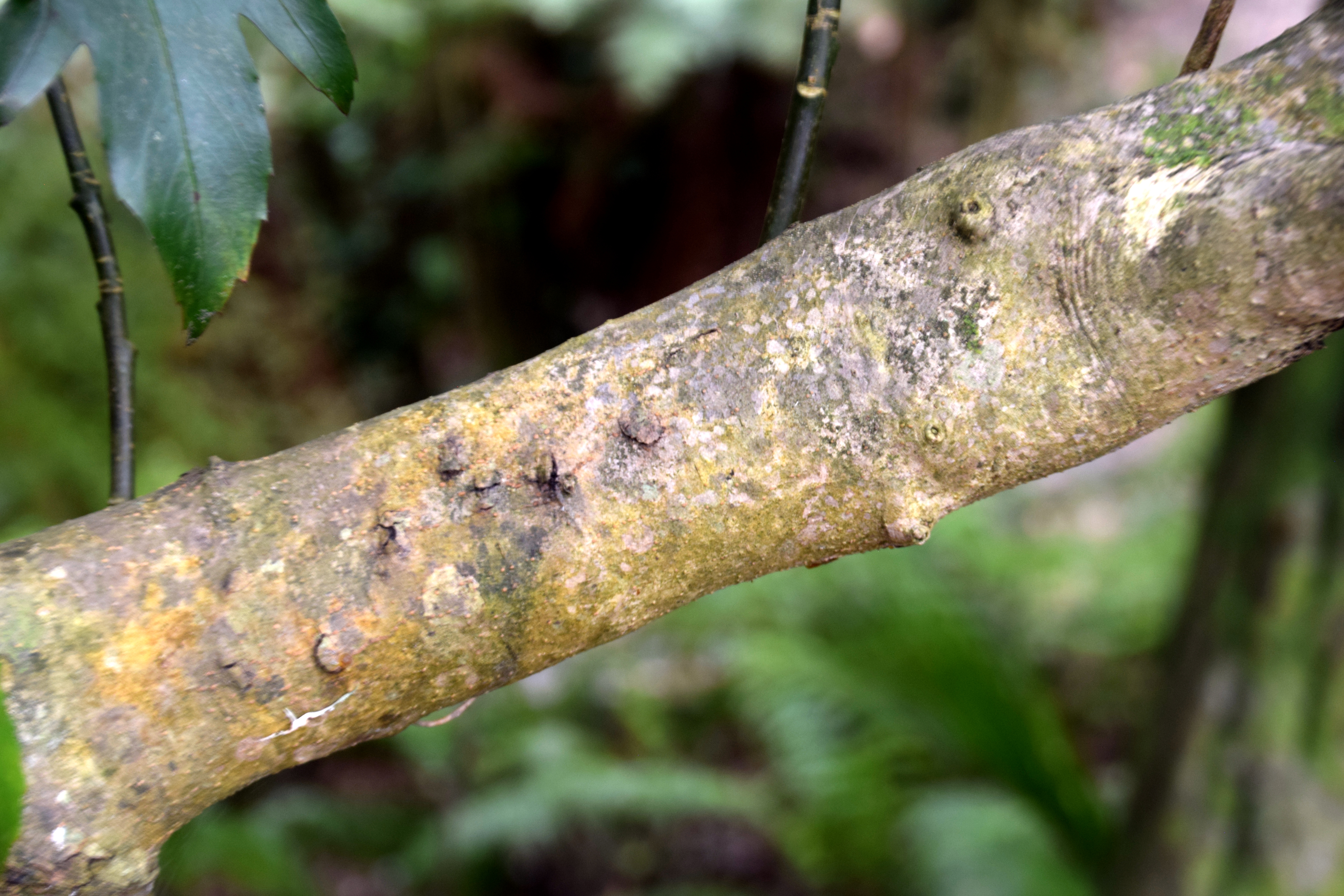
A branch

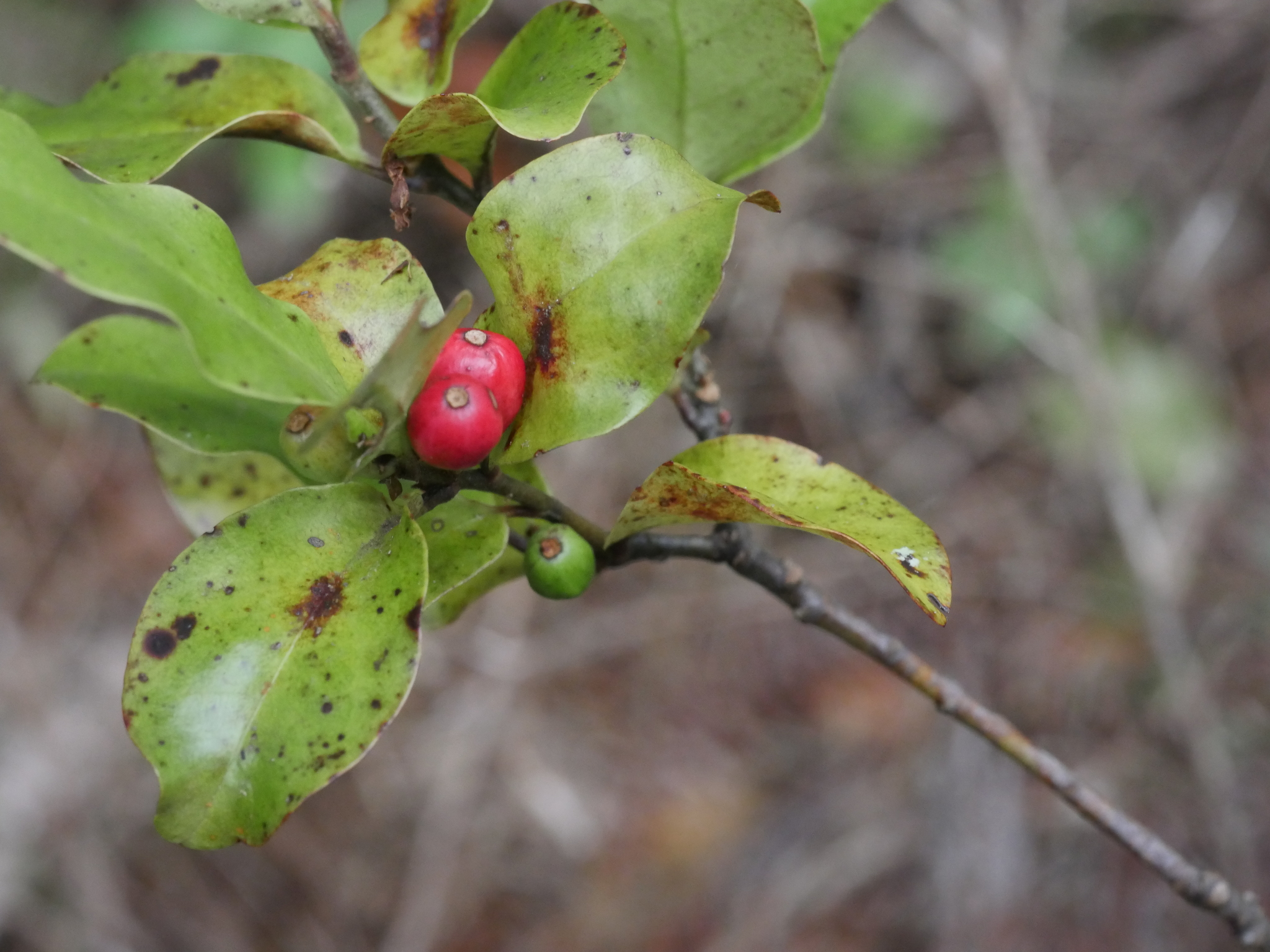
The fruit

== Taxonomy ==
A. quercifolia was first described by Allan Cunningham from the collections of him and his brother Richard Cunningham in the eleventh volume of the Annals and Magazine of Natural History, published in 1839. Describing eight species: A. macrophylla, A. quercifolia, A. ligustrifolia, A. linariifolia, A. atriplicifolia, A. banksii, A. palaeiformis, and A. ilex all under the family Rubiaceae, he noted that Alseuosmia differed from Caprifoliaceae and Loranthaceae by its long and tubed mono-petaled flower, berry-like fruit, having its stamens inserted into the corolla, and alternate leaves, among other differences.

46 years later, in 1885, W. Colenso described a new species: A. pusilla, which was first demoted by Thomas Kirk in 1899 to a variety of A. quercifolia and later, in 1925, by Thomas Cheeseman to simply a synonym thereof. In his 1961 book "The Flora of New Zealand" Harry Howard Barton Allan disagreed with this proposition, demoting instead A. ilex to a synonym and bringing back the eight original species, first described by Allan Cunningham in 1839, while keeping the newly described A. pusilla. In a 1978 article in the New Zealand Journal of Botany (NZJB) the botanist Rhys Gardner took a different approach, accepting only A. banksii, A. macrophylla, A. pusilla and a new species A. turneri, considering the rest to be hybrids.

In the most current incarnation of the genus, however, A. quercifolia is accepted as a species, as suggested by M. F. Merrett and B. D. Clarkson in a NZJB article from 2000 in which they dispute the claims of hybridism and synonymity.

=== Etymology ===
Alseuosmia is Ancient Greek for perfume or scented grove and the specific epithet quercifolia, oak-leaved.

== Distribution and habitat ==
A. quercifolia is found only in the North Island of New Zealand North of 38˚S, though is not found in the Coromandel or Bay of Plenty. It has been recorded on Great Barrier Island and Waiheke Island but is most common in lowland forest in the Waikato region. Its preferred habitat are areas which have more than 1100mm in annual rainfall, slope southward, are cool, and are free draining.

== Ecology ==
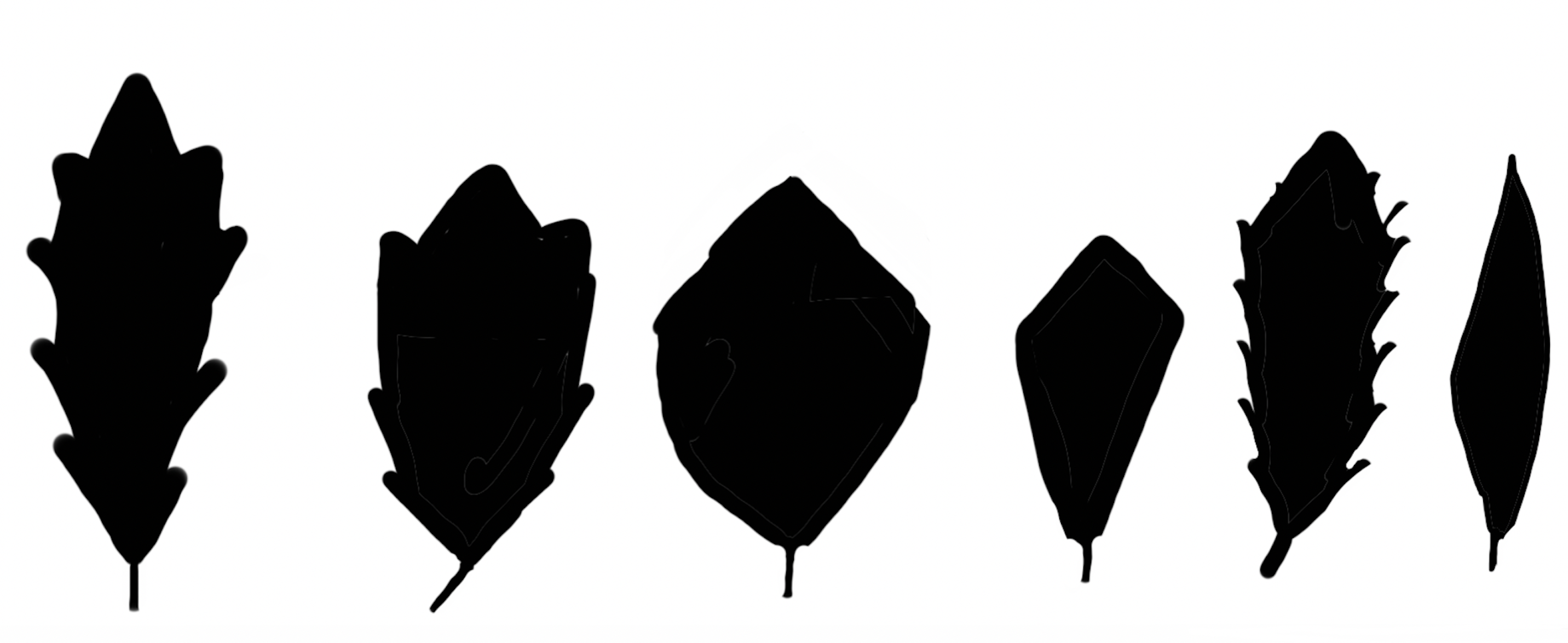
Leaf shape variation

Many vascular plant species grow in association with A. quercifolia but it is consistently found with Tawa, Hangehange, Rewarewa, Mahoe, and Suppplejack. The plant is commonly browsed by pests such as Brushtail possums, feral goats, Fallow deer, and potentially also hares. The cicada Melampsalta cingulata lays its eggs on the stem, causing the death of the stem above that point. Other species which cause damage to the leaves include various slugs and snails as well as the Common leaf-roller's cocoon. Although rare now, pollination has been recorded by Hihi and Korimako and it's suspected that moths also play a role, with the species Epyaxa rosearia identified in particular. The berries are dispersed by Kōkako and Kererū and historically by Moa and Kākāpō.

== Cultivation ==
Can be cultivated from both seed and cuttings, the seeds germinating in spring and cuttings taking 5 - 8 weeks for root development. Seedlings can be easily identified by their red petioles and white veins. Growing from cuttings is reported to have a 100% success rate, whereas growing from seed, even with the perfect conditions of low light, 13˚C temperature and soaked in Gibberellic acid, gains only a 65% success rate. It is easiest to grow in pots, but if planted out needs a partial shade and rich soil. A. quercifolia is also, however, prone to sudden collapse.
