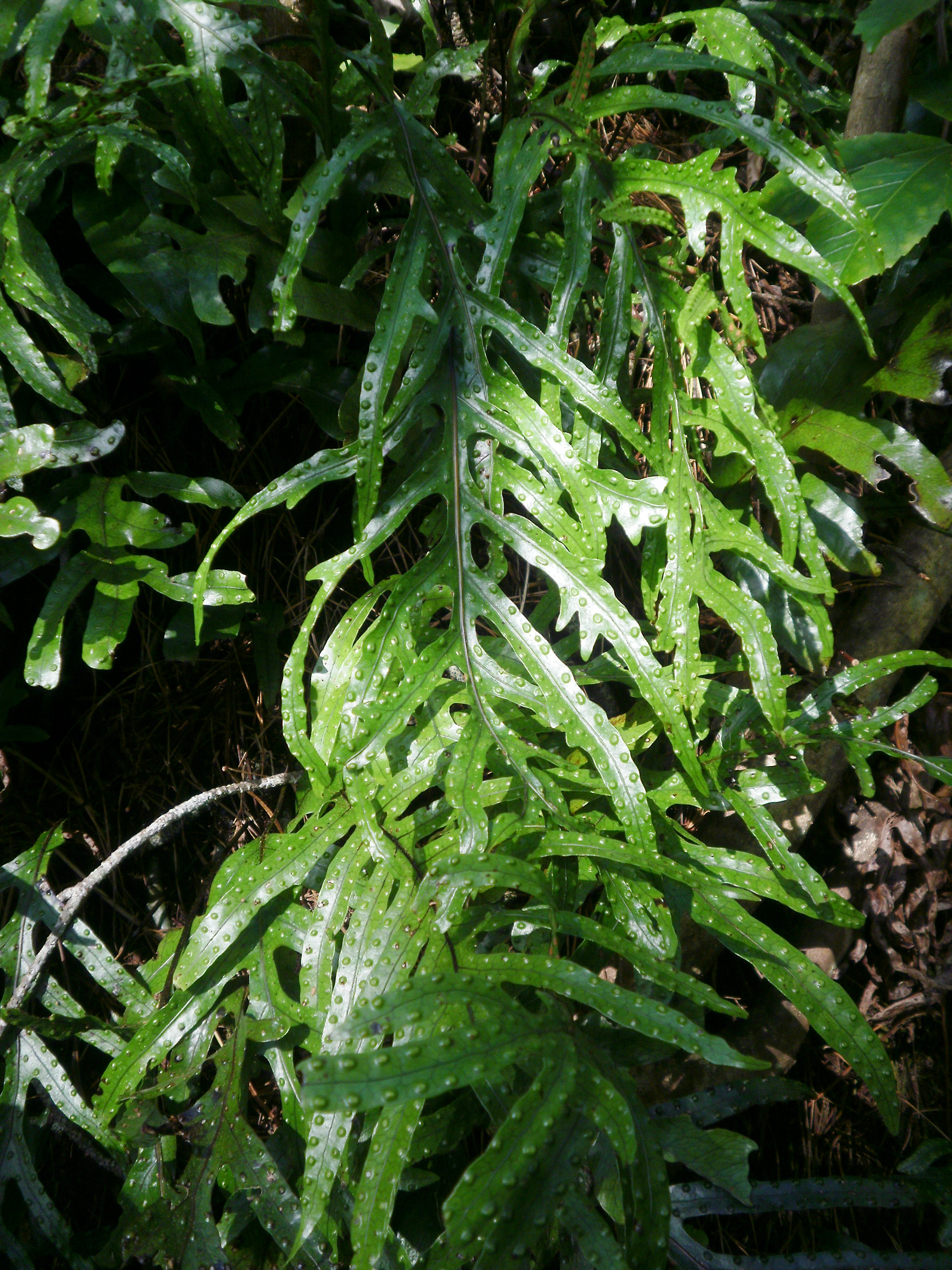

Scientific classification
- Kingdom: Plantae
- Clade: Tracheophytes
- Division: Polypodiophyta
- Class: Polypodiopsida
- Order: Polypodiales
- Suborder: Polypodiineae
- Family: Polypodiaceae
- Genus: Dendroconche
- Species: D. scandens

Binomial name
- Dendroconche scandens (G. Forst.) Testo, Sundue & A.R.Field

Synonyms
- Drynaria scandens (G.Forst.) Fée; Microsorum scandens (G.Forst.) Tindale; Phymatodes pustulatum Cheeseman (non G.Forst.); Phymatodes scandens (G.Forst.) C. Presl; Phymatosorus scandens (G.Forst.) Pic.Serm.; Polypodium scandens G.Forst.

= Dendroconche scandens =

Species of fern

Dendroconche scandens, synonym Microsorum scandens, commonly called mokimoki, or fragrant fern, is a species of fern within the family Polypodiaceae. This species is native to parts of New Zealand and Australia, as well as some offshore islands (Chatham Island, Lord Howe Island and Norfolk Island). It has been introduced to South Africa and Zimbabwe. An example occurrence in New Zealand's North Island is in the Hamilton Ecological District where it is associated with a number of other ferns including Icarus filiforme and Lomaria discolor. In general, it is found in lowland and coastal forested regions.

It is a climbing fern, with thin stems (2–4 mm in diameter). Juvenile fronds are small and undivided, whereas adult fronds are larger, thin, and divided; they are dull green in colour. The sori (spore clusters) are dome-like, small, and brownish in colour. It was traditionally used to mask unpleasant odours.
