= Flore de la Nouvelle-Calédonie =

Flore de la Nouvelle-Calédonie is an ongoing multi-volume flora describing the vascular plants of New Caledonia (including the Loyalty Islands, Isles of Pines and Belep islands) in the South-West Pacific. published by the National Museum of Natural History in Paris since 1967. Each species treatment typically includes taxonomic information, morphological description, a line drawing and a distribution map. Originally published as Flore de la Nouvelle-Calédonie et Dépendances, since 2014 it has been renamed shortly Flore de la Nouvelle-Calédonie and is co-published with Institut de Recherche pour le Développement in a fully colored format. Flore de la Nouvelle-Calédonie currently consists of 27 volumes, covering little over 50% of a total of approximately 3,400 species native to the New Caledonian archipelago. Major botanical families awaiting treatment include Rubiaceae, Cyperaceae, Rutaceae, and Poaceae.

== List of published volumes ==
- Volume 1 (1967) – Sapotaceae by A. Aubréville
- Volume 2 (1968) – Proteaceae by R. Virot
- Volume 3 (1969) –Pteridophytes (Ferns & Lycopods) by G. Brownlie
- Volume 4 (1972) – Gymnosperms by D.J. de Laubenfels
- Volume 5 (1974) – Lauraceae by A.J.G. Kostermans
- Volume 6 (1975) – Epacridaceae (genera now included in Ericaceae) by Robert Virot
- Volume 7 (1976) – Acanthaceae, Bignoniaceae, Boraginaceae & Solanaceae by H.Heine
- Volume 8 (1977) – Orchidaceae by N. Hallé
- Volume 9 (1980) – Flacourtiaceae (genera now included in Salicaceae) by M. Lescot, Symplocaceae by H.P. Nooteboom, Icacinaceae (genera now placed in Cardiopteridaceae, Metteniusaceae and Stemonuraceae), Corynocarpaceae & Olacaceae by J.F. Villiers
- Volume 10 (1981) – Apocynaceae (excluding former Asclepiadaceae) by P. Boiteau
- Volume 11 (1982) – Elaeocarpaceae by C. Tirel, Monimiaceae, Amborellaceae, Atherospermataceae, Trimeniaceae, Chloranthaceae by J. Jérémie
- Volume 12 (1983) – Fabaceae-Mimosoideae by I. Nielsen, Chrysobalanaceae by G. Prance, Plumbaginaceae by J. Edmondson
- Volume 13 (1984) – Convolvulaceae by H. Heine
- Volume 14 (1987) – Euphorbiaceae part I (including genera now placed in Picrodendraceae) by G. McPherson & C. Tirel
- Volume 15 (1988) – Hernandiaceae by J. Jérémie, Meliaceae by D.J. Mabberley, Oncothecaceae by P. Morat & J.-M. Veillon, Santalaceae by N. Hallé
- Volume 16 (1990) – Dilleniaceae by J.-M. Veillon, Goodeniaceae by I.H. Müller, Iridaceae by P. Goldblatt, Campynemataceae by P. Goldblatt
- Volume 17 (1991) – Euphorbiaceae - Phyllanthoideae (genera now placed in Phyllanthaceae and Putranjivaceae) by G. McPherson & M. Schmid
- Volume 18 (1992) – Myrtaceae-Leptospermoideae (Myrtaceae excluding Myrteae and Syzygieae) by J.W. Dawson
- Volume 19 (1993) – Ebenaceae by F. White, Winteraceae by W. Vink
- Volume 20 (1996) – Celastraceae by I.H. Müller, Loranthaceae & Viscaceae (Korthalsella now placed in Santalaceae) by B.A. Barlow, Alseuosmiaceae (Periomphale) by C. Tirel & J. Jérémie, Paracryphiaceae (Paracryphia) by J. Jérémie, Tiliaceae (genera now placed in Malvaceae-Grewioideae) by C. Tirel
- Volume 21 (1997) – Sphenostemonaceae (Sphenostemon now placed in Paracryphiaceae) by J. Jérémie, Anacardiaceae by M. Hoff, Cruciferae by B. Jonsell
- Volume 22 (1998) – Menispermaceae by L. Forman, Oleaceae & Passifloraceae by P.S. Green
- Volume 23 (1999) – Myrtaceae-Syzygium by J.W. Dawson
- Volume 24 (2002) – Pittosporaceae by C. Tirel & J.-M. Veillon
- Volume 25 (2004) – Hippocrateaceae (Dicarpellum now placed in Celastraceae) by M.P. Simmons, Labiatae by D.J. Mabberley & R.P.J. de Kok, Vitaceae by D.J. Mabberley
- Volume 26 (2014) – Cunoniaceae by H.C.F. Hopkins, Y. Pillon & R.D. Hoogland
- Volume 27 (2020) – Apocynaceae p.p. (Periplocoideae, Secamonoideae and Asclepiadoideae) by S. Liede-Schumann, U. Meve & G. Gâteblé, Phellinaceae by G. Barriera, Capparaceae by S. Fici

== off series ==
- Catalogue of introduced and cultivated plants in New Caledonia by H.S. McKee (1985: first edition, 1994: second edition)
