= Grevillea mondorensis =

Conservation status
- Critically Endangered (IUCN 3.1)

Scientific classification
- Kingdom: Plantae
- Clade: Tracheophytes
- Clade: Angiosperms
- Clade: Eudicots
- Order: Proteales
- Family: Proteaceae
- Genus: Grevillea
- Species: G. mondorensis

Binomial name
- Grevillea mondorensis Majourau & Pillon

Synonyms
- Grevillea gillivrayi var. glabriflora (Brongn. & Gris) Virot

Species of shrub endemic to New Caledonia

Grevillea mondorensis is a critically endangered species of flowering plant in the family Proteaceae and is endemic to Mont Dore in south-eastern New Caledonia.

== Taxonomy ==
Grevillea mondorensis was first described as Grevillea gillivrayi var. glabriflora by Robert Virot in Volume 2 of Flore de la Nouvelle Calédonie et dépendances in 1968 by the holotype collected in 1955.

It has most recently been described as a separate species in the botanical journal Phytotaxa in 2020. The specific epithet mondorensis refers to Mont Dore, the only known location where the species is found.

== Distribution and habitat ==
Grevillea mondorensis is only known from Mont-Dore in the southern region of mainland New Caledonia. It occurs in scrubland on ultramafic soils from altitudes of between 100 and 500 metres (330–1,640 ft) above sea level.

== Conservation status ==
Grevillea mondorensis is listed as critically endangered on the IUCN Red List of Threatened Species. It has a very low population estimate of less than 50 mature individuals and it has been observed to have a very low regeneration rate. It is threatened by habitat degradation from uncontrolled bushfires. It is not protected by national legislation and it is not known to occur in any protected areas.
