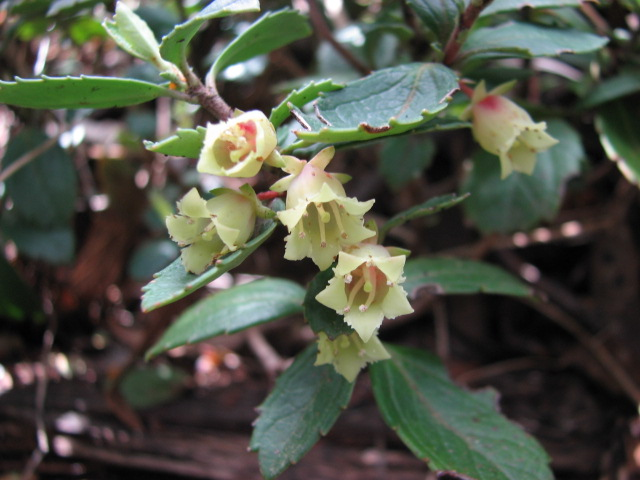

Scientific classification
- Kingdom: Plantae
- Clade: Tracheophytes
- Clade: Angiosperms
- Clade: Eudicots
- Clade: Asterids
- Order: Asterales
- Family: Alseuosmiaceae
- Genus: Wittsteinia
- Species: W. vacciniacea

Binomial name
- Wittsteinia vacciniacea F.Muell.

= Wittsteinia vacciniacea =

Species of shrub

Wittsteinia vacciniacea , the Baw Baw berry, is a shrub species in the family Alseuosmiaceae. It is endemic to Victoria, Australia. It grows to about 40 cm high and has leaves which are between 1 and 5 cm long. The fragrant flowers are between 4.5 and 7 mm long and are followed by greenish-white rounded fruits.

The species was first formally described by botanist Ferdinand von Mueller in Fragmenta Phytographiae Australiae in 1861.

It occurs on the edge of rainforest and in sheltered woodland in the Eastern Highlands of Victoria.
