= Wittsteinia balansae =

Scientific classification
- Kingdom: Plantae
- Clade: Tracheophytes
- Clade: Angiosperms
- Clade: Eudicots
- Clade: Asterids
- Order: Asterales
- Family: Alseuosmiaceae
- Genus: Wittsteinia
- Species: W. balansae

Binomial name
- Wittsteinia balansae (Baill.) Steenis

Synonyms
- Periomphale balansae Baill.; Memecylanthus neocaledonicus Gilg & Schltr.; Pachydiscus gaultherioides Gilg & Schltr.; Periomphale gaultherioides (Gilg & Schltr.) Steenis; Periomphale neocaledonica (Gilg & Schltr.) Steenis; Periomphale pancheri Baill.; Pittosporum penduliflorum Baker f.

Species of shrub

Wittsteinia balansae is a species of shrub in the Alseuosmiaceae family. It is endemic to New Caledonia. It was originally described in its own genus Periomphale.
