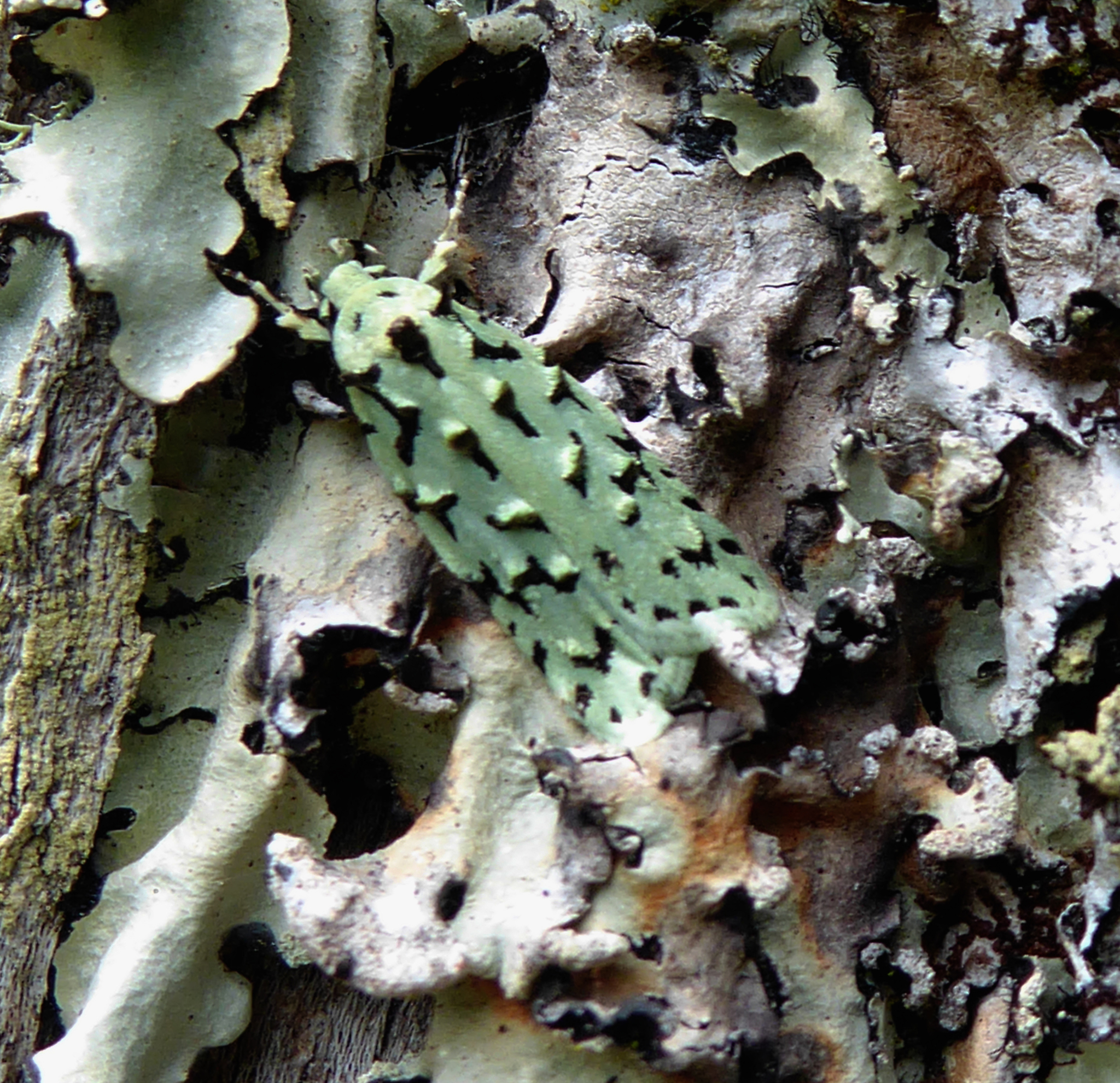

Scientific classification
- Kingdom: Animalia
- Phylum: Arthropoda
- Clade: Pancrustacea
- Class: Insecta
- Order: Lepidoptera
- Family: Oecophoridae
- Genus: Izatha
- Species: I. peroneanella

Binomial name
- Izatha peroneanella (Walker, 1864)

Synonyms
- Gelechia peroneanella Walker, 1864; Gelechia adapertella Walker, 1864; Cryptolechia lichenella Walker, 1864; Oecophora huttoni Butler, 1879; Semiocosma mystis Meyrick, 1888

= Izatha peroneanella =

Species of moth

Izatha peroneanella, also known as the small lichen moth or the green lichen tuft, is a moth of the family Oecophoridae. It is endemic to New Zealand, where it is found throughout the North Island, other than the Aupouri Peninsula of Northland.

== Description ==
The wingspan is 15–24.5 mm for males and 17–29.5 mm for females. This moth has pale green forewings with patches of raised black scales that camouflage it well when it rests on lichens. The colouration of this moth is variable with the pale green forewings sometimes being white while in another form the black tufts are coloured brown. The male lectotype, collected in Auckland by D. Bolton, is held at the Natural History Museum, London.

== Distribution ==
This species is endemic to New Zealand. It is found in the North Island with the exception of the Aupouri Peninsula.

== Biology and behaviour ==
Larvae of this species grow to approximately 16mm long and pupate in early November within its tunnel. There is one generation per year. Adults are on wing from September to early April. They are attracted to light and have been collected via a mercury vapour light trap.

== Habitat and host species ==
This species is commonly found near native forest.

Larvae have been recorded feeding on the dead wood of a variety of angiosperm species. They bore tunnels into the wood. The larvae usually prefer standing dead trees rather than wood found on the forest floor. Larvae have been reared from Alseuosmia species, Carpodetus serratus, Coprosma grandifolia, Coriaria arborea, Fuchsia excorticata, Notelaea species, Pseudopanax arboreus, Ripogonum scandens, Sophora species and Wisteria species.
