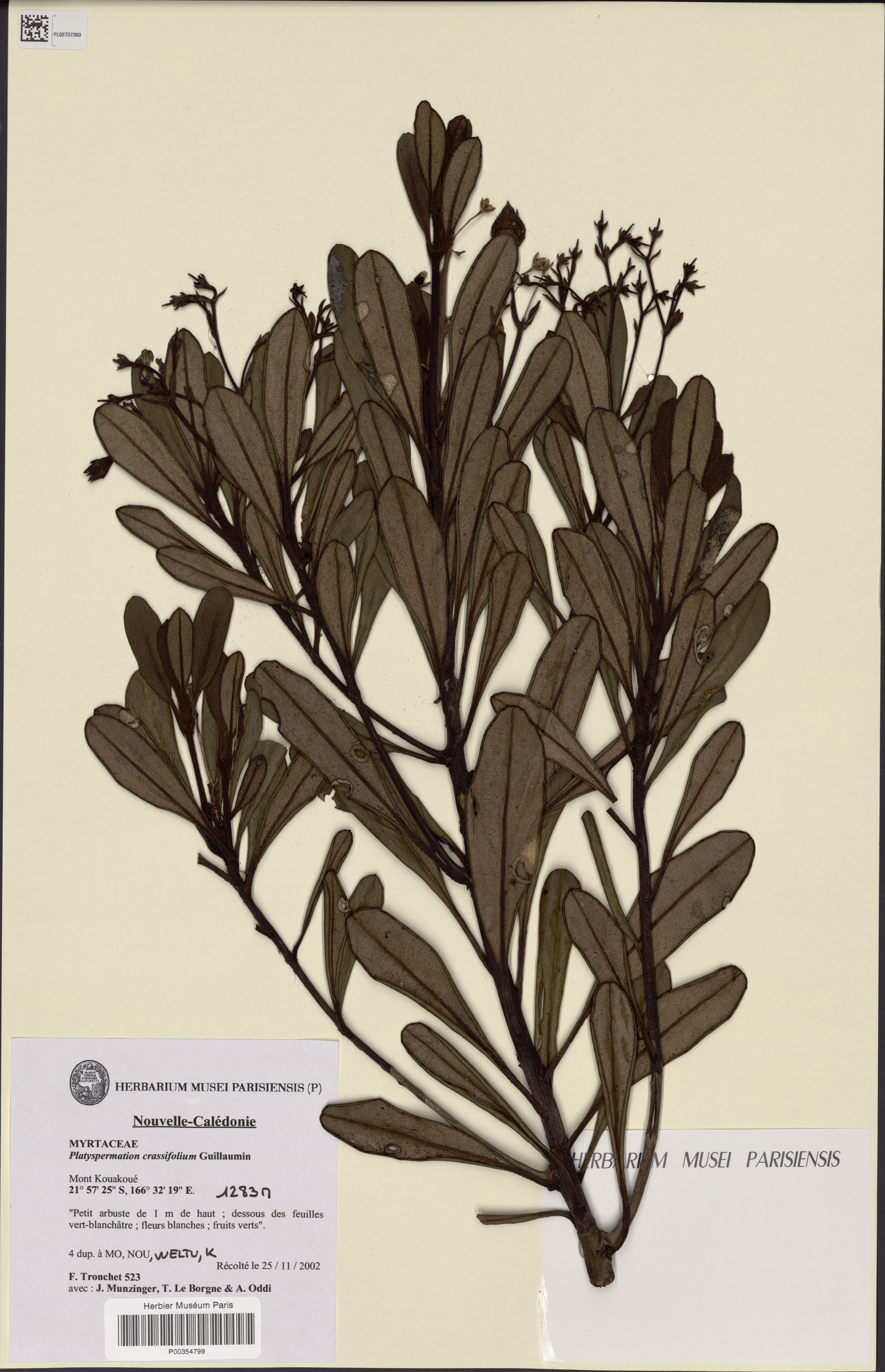

Conservation status
- Near Threatened (IUCN 3.1)

Scientific classification
- Kingdom: Plantae
- Clade: Tracheophytes
- Clade: Angiosperms
- Clade: Eudicots
- Clade: Asterids
- Order: Asterales
- Family: Alseuosmiaceae
- Genus: Platyspermation; Guillaumin
- Species: P. crassifolium

Binomial name
- Platyspermation crassifolium Guillaumin

= Platyspermation =

Genus of flowering plants

Platyspermation is a genus of plant in family Alseuosmiaceae. The genus contains a single species, Platyspermation crassifolium, and is endemic to New Caledonia.
