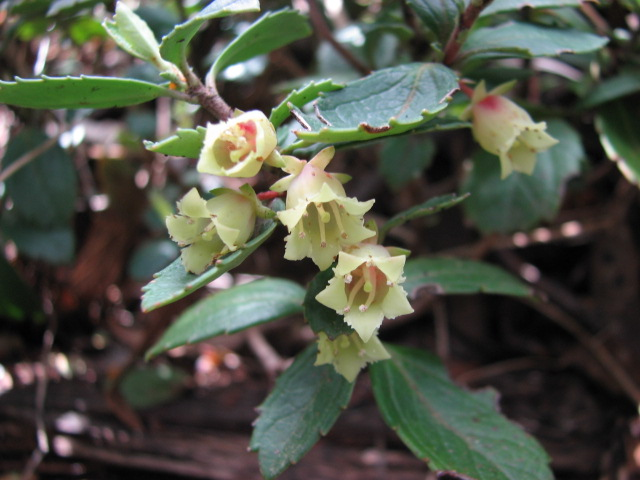
- Wittsteinia vacciniacea

Scientific classification
- Kingdom: Plantae
- Clade: Tracheophytes
- Clade: Angiosperms
- Clade: Eudicots
- Clade: Asterids
- Order: Asterales
- Family: Alseuosmiaceae
- Genus: Wittsteinia; F.Muell.

Species
- See text

Synonyms
- Periomphale Baill.; Memecylanthus Gilg & Schltr.; Pachydiscus Gilg & Schltr.

= Wittsteinia =

Genus of flowering plants

Wittsteinia is a small genus of flowering plants in the family Alseuosmiaceae. The genus was first formally described by botanist Ferdinand von Mueller in Fragmenta Phytographiae Australiae in 1861. The name honours Dr Georg Christian Wittstein, the author of an etymological dictionary used as a reference by Mueller.

The genus comprises three species:

- Wittsteinia balansae (Baill.) Steenis from New Caledonia
- Wittsteinia papuana (Steen.) Steen. – from Papua New Guinea
- Wittsteinia vacciniacea F.Muell. – Baw Baw berry, from Victoria, Australia
