= Georg Christian Wittstein =

Botanist (1810–1887)

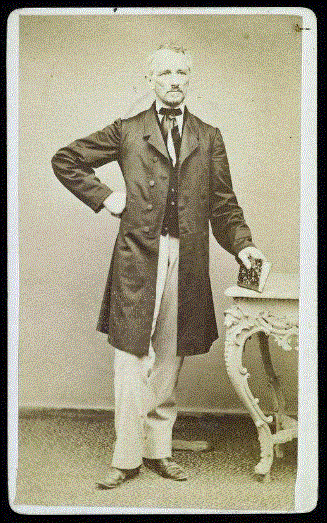
Georg Christian Wittstein (Deutsche Digitale Bibliothek)

Georg Christian Wittstein (25 January 1810, in Hann. Münden – 1 June 1887, in Munich) was a German pharmaceutical botanist and chemist. He trained as a pharmacist in Minden, then worked as a pharmacy assistant in Clausthal, Güstrow und Hanover. In 1840, he received his doctorate from the Ludwig-Maximilians-Universität München, where he worked for several years as an assistant at the pharmaceutical institute. From 1851 to 1853, he taught classes at the technical school in Ansbach, and afterwards spent many years as director of a private school for chemistry in Munich (1853–1879).

The plant genus Wittsteinia (family Alseuosmiaceae) was named in his honor by Ferdinand von Mueller.

== Selected works ==
- Anleitung zur Darstellung und Prüfung chemischer und pharmaceutischer Präparate (2nd edition, 1851) – Instructions for presentation and examination of chemical and pharmaceutical preparations.
- Etymologisch-botanisches Handwörterbuch (2nd edition, 1856) – Etymological-botanical dictionary.
- Taschenbuch der Geheimmittellehre, 1867 – Paperback of nostrums.
- The organic constituents of plants and vegetable substances and their chemical analysis, 1878 (by Ferdinand von Mueller; English translation of Wittstein's Anleitung zur chemischen Analyse von Pflanzentheilen auf ihre organischen Bestandtheile).
- Die Naturgeschichte des Cajus Plinius Secundus, 1881–82 – Natural history of Pliny the Elder.
- Handwörterbuch der Pharmakognosie des Pflanzenreichs – Dictionary of pharmacognosy of the plant kingdom, 1882.
