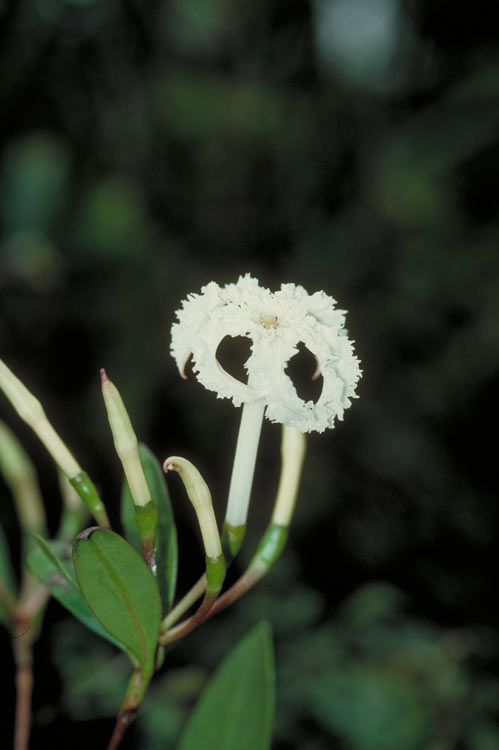

Scientific classification
- Kingdom: Plantae
- Clade: Tracheophytes
- Clade: Angiosperms
- Clade: Eudicots
- Clade: Asterids
- Order: Asterales
- Family: Alseuosmiaceae
- Genus: Crispiloba; Steenis
- Species: C. disperma

Binomial name
- Crispiloba disperma (S.Moore) Steenis

Synonyms
- Randia disperma S.Moore

= Crispiloba =

Genus of flowering plants

Crispiloba is a monotypic genus of flowering plants containing the single species Crispiloba disperma, native to Queensland, Australia. It is a shrub species that grows to about 4 m (13 ft) tall, with fragrant white flowers followed by purplish ovoid fruits. It occurs in rainforest in north-east Queensland at altitudes ranging from 100 to 1,250 m (330 to 4,100 ft). The species was first formally described in 1917, based on plant material collected from Mount Bellenden Ker. It was originally given the name Randia disperma and subsequently transferred to the genus Crispiloba in 1984.
