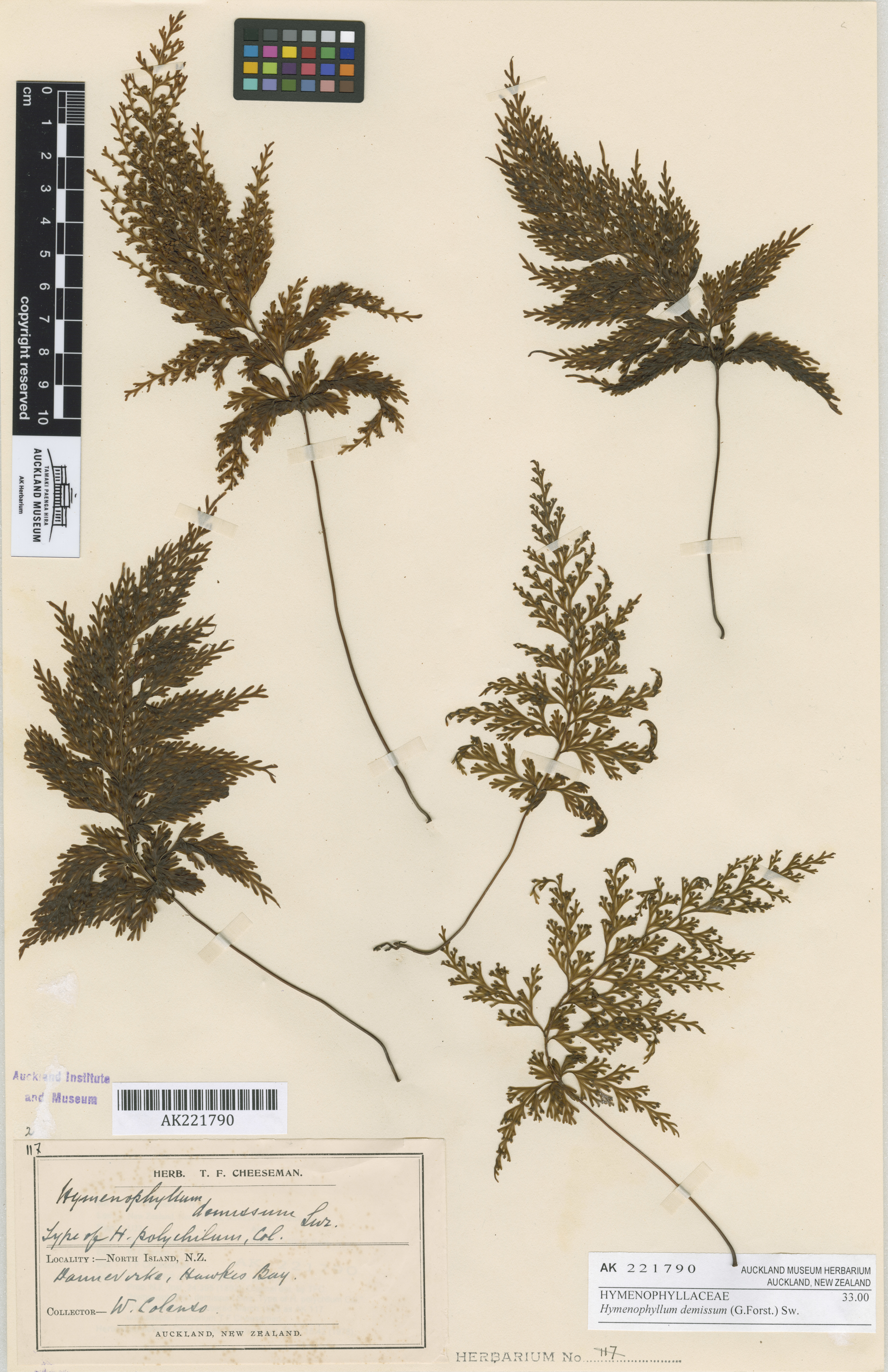
- Syntype specimen of Hymenophyllum demissum held at Auckland Museum

Scientific classification
- Kingdom: Plantae
- Clade: Tracheophytes
- Division: Polypodiophyta
- Class: Polypodiopsida
- Order: Hymenophyllales
- Family: Hymenophyllaceae
- Genus: Hymenophyllum
- Species: H. demissum

Binomial name
- Hymenophyllum demissum (G.Forst.) Sw.

= Hymenophyllum demissum =

Species of fern

Hymenophyllum demissum is a species of fern in the family Hymenophyllaceae. H. demissum is found in New Zealand, with a specific example occurrence being in North Island's Hamilton Ecological District in a Nothofagus-podocarp forest in association with other fern species understory plants, crown fern, Blechnum discolor being an example.
