= Zieria chevalieri =

Conservation status
- Endangered (IUCN 3.1)

Scientific classification
- Kingdom: Plantae
- Clade: Tracheophytes
- Clade: Angiosperms
- Clade: Eudicots
- Clade: Rosids
- Order: Sapindales
- Family: Rutaceae
- Genus: Zieria
- Species: Z. chevalieri

Binomial name
- Zieria chevalieri Virot

Species of flowering plant

Zieria chevalieri is an endangered species of flowering plant in the family Rutaceae. It is endemic to Mount Kaala in New Caledonia.

== Description ==
Zieria chevalieri is a shrub 30–75 cm (12–30 in) tall, sparsely branched with scars from fallen leaves. Leaves are whorled and condensed at the end of branches in groups of 3 or 4, are 4–5 cm (1.6–2.0 in) long and 0.2 cm (0.079 in) wide with short, scattered hairs on the dorsal surface. The ventral surface is light green with dense hairs and a slightly prominent midrib. The margins are slightly recurved, the apex is pointed and the base is tapered into a slender petiole.

Flowers are borne on axillary inflorescences with 2–7 flowers each. Petals are white or slightly pink, 5 mm (0.20 in) long with very slight indumentum. The peduncle is 2 cm (0.79 in) long and the pedicel is 7 mm (0.28 in) long, covered with reddish hairs and with two narrow, triangular bracteoles at the base. The four sepals are fused at the base and covered in reddish hairs. The four stamens have hairy filaments and the ovary is globose with four lobes.

Fruit is a capsule with four subunits (often with 1–3 aborted), 6 mm (0.24 in) wide and 2.5 mm (0.098 in) long, opened by 2 valves which usually contain a single black, oblong seed, 1.5 mm (0.059 in) wide and 3 mm (0.12 in) long.

It is distinct in that its leaves are arranged in whorls of 3 or 4, whereas Australian Zieria species leaves are arranged oppositely and are almost always trifoliate.

== Taxonomy ==
Zieria chevalieri was first formally described in 1953 by Robert Virot in Mémoires du Muséum national d'histoire naturelle. Série B, Botanique. The specific epithet honours French botanist Auguste Chevalier.

== Distribution and habitat ==
This species is known only from a small population on Mount Kaala in north-western New Caledonia. It grows in humid forest and shrubland ultramafic substrate at elevations of 40–970 metres (130–3,180 ft) above sea level. It is known from 6 subpopulations and has an estimated extent of occurrence (EOO) and area of occupancy (AOO) of only 12 km^{2} (4.6 sq mi).

== Conservation ==
Zieria chevalieri is listed as endangered on the IUCN Red List of Threatened Species, with its assessment done in 2015 and published in 2020. It is primarily threatened by degradation of its habitat as a result of nickel mining on Mount Kaala. Mining pressure in New Caledonia has been increasing, with 164,000 metric tons of nickel produced in 2013, 186,000 in 2015 and 231,000 in 2023. It is also threatened by bushfires at lower altitudes, although at the time the species assessment was published, it did not seem to be affected.

This species is legally protected under the North Province in New Caledonia. In partnership in 2015 with the New Caledonian Agronomic Institute, research and conservation work on the species was conducted. This included monitoring, propagation tests, collecting cuttings and studying genetics. Propagation through cuttings was largely unsuccessful, with a 95% mortality rate of specimens.

The species does not occur in any protected areas and its population size remains unknown, though it seems to form dense subpopulations.
