= Grevillea deplanchei =

Conservation status
- Vulnerable (IUCN 3.1)

Scientific classification
- Kingdom: Plantae
- Clade: Tracheophytes
- Clade: Angiosperms
- Clade: Eudicots
- Order: Proteales
- Family: Proteaceae
- Genus: Grevillea
- Species: G. deplanchei

Binomial name
- Grevillea deplanchei Brongn. & Gris

Synonyms
- Grevillea gillivrayi f. angustifolia Virot; Grevillea comptonii S.Moore

Species of flowering plant

Grevillea deplanchei is a species of flowering plant in the family Proteaceae and is endemic to south-eastern New Caledonia.

== Taxonomy ==
Grevillea deplanchei was first scientifically described in 1865 in Bulletin de la Société botanique de France. It was formerly described as a subspecies of Grevillea gillivrayi by Robert Virot in 1968, but was most recently elevated to species status in the botanical journal Phytotaxa in 2020.

== Distribution and habitat ==
Grevillea deplanchei is endemic to the southern massif of mainland New Caledonia. It grows in riparian scrubland on ultramafic and serpentine soils at elevations of 6 to 900 m (20 to 3,000 ft) above sea level. Its occurs in approximately 8 subpopulations with an extent of occurrence (EOO) estimated at 1,519 km^{2} (586 sq mi) and area of occupancy (AOO) estimated at 108 km^{2} (42 sq mi).

== Conservation status ==
This species of Grevillea is listed as vulnerable on the IUCN Red List of Threatened Species. It is threatened by habitat disturbance through the change of river flows from gravel deposits, soil erosion, uncontrolled bushfires and mining activities. It is also threatened by logging as its wood is used for barbeques.
