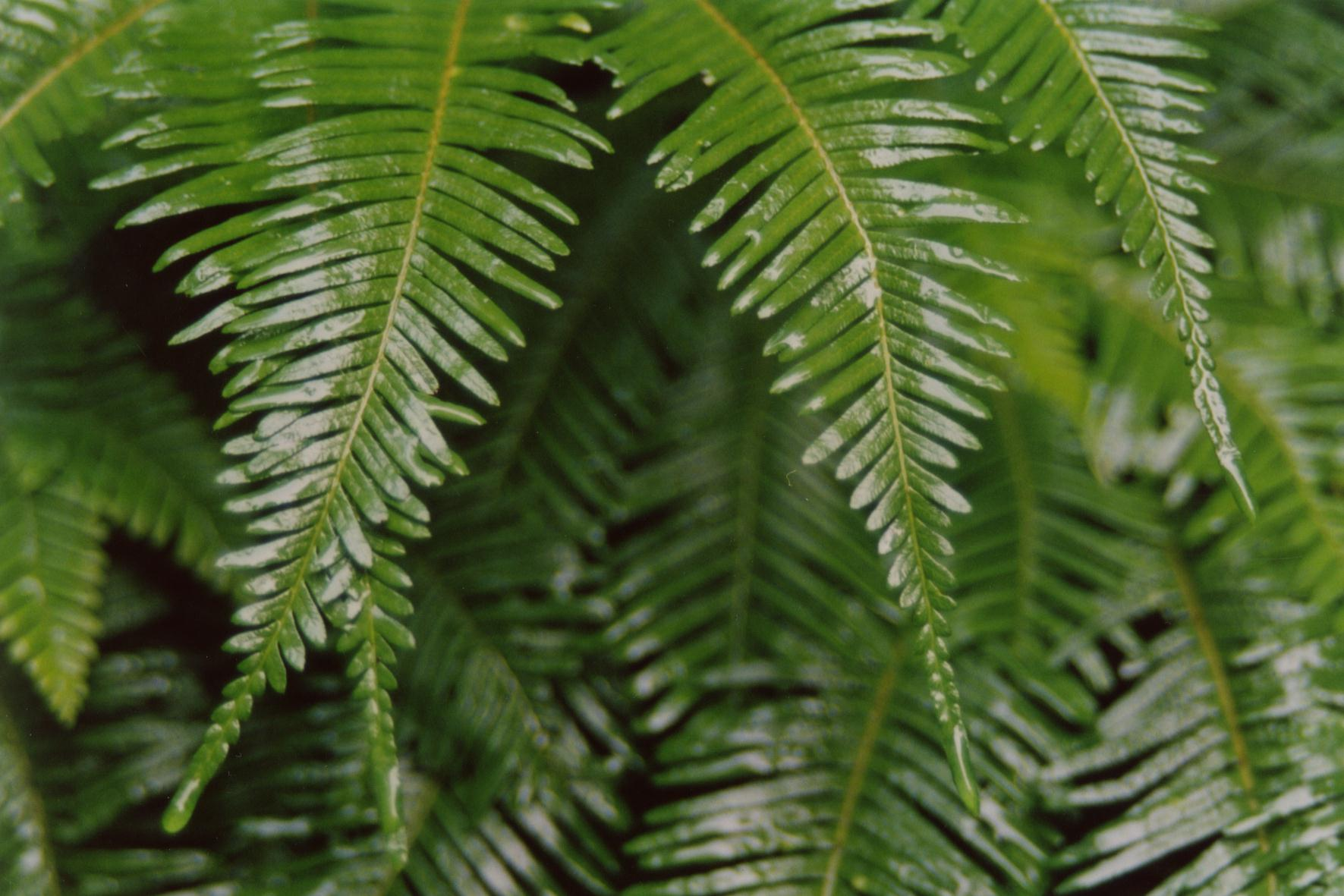
- Lomaria nuda

Scientific classification
- Kingdom: Plantae
- Clade: Tracheophytes
- Division: Polypodiophyta
- Class: Polypodiopsida
- Order: Polypodiales
- Suborder: Aspleniineae
- Family: Blechnaceae
- Subfamily: Woodwardioideae
- Genus: Lomaria; Willd.

= Lomaria =

Genus of ferns

Lomaria is a genus of ferns belonging to the family Blechnaceae.

== Species ==
As of July 2025, the Checklist of Ferns and Lycophytes of the World accepted the following seven species:

- Lomaria brunea (M.Kessler & A.R.Sm.) Gasper & V.A.O.Dittrich
- Lomaria discolor (G.Forst.) Willd.
- Lomaria inflexa Kunze
- Lomaria nuda (Labill.) Willd. (syn. Blechnum nudum (Labill.) Mett.)
- Lomaria oceanica (Rosenst.) Gasper & V.A.O.Dittrich (syn. Blechnum oceanicum (Rosenst.) Brownlie)
- Lomaria socialis (Sodiro) Sodiro (syn Blechnum sociale Sodiro), of uncertain placement
- Lomaria spannagelii (Rosenst.) Gasper & V.A.O.Dittrich (syn. Blechnum spannagelii Rosenst.)
