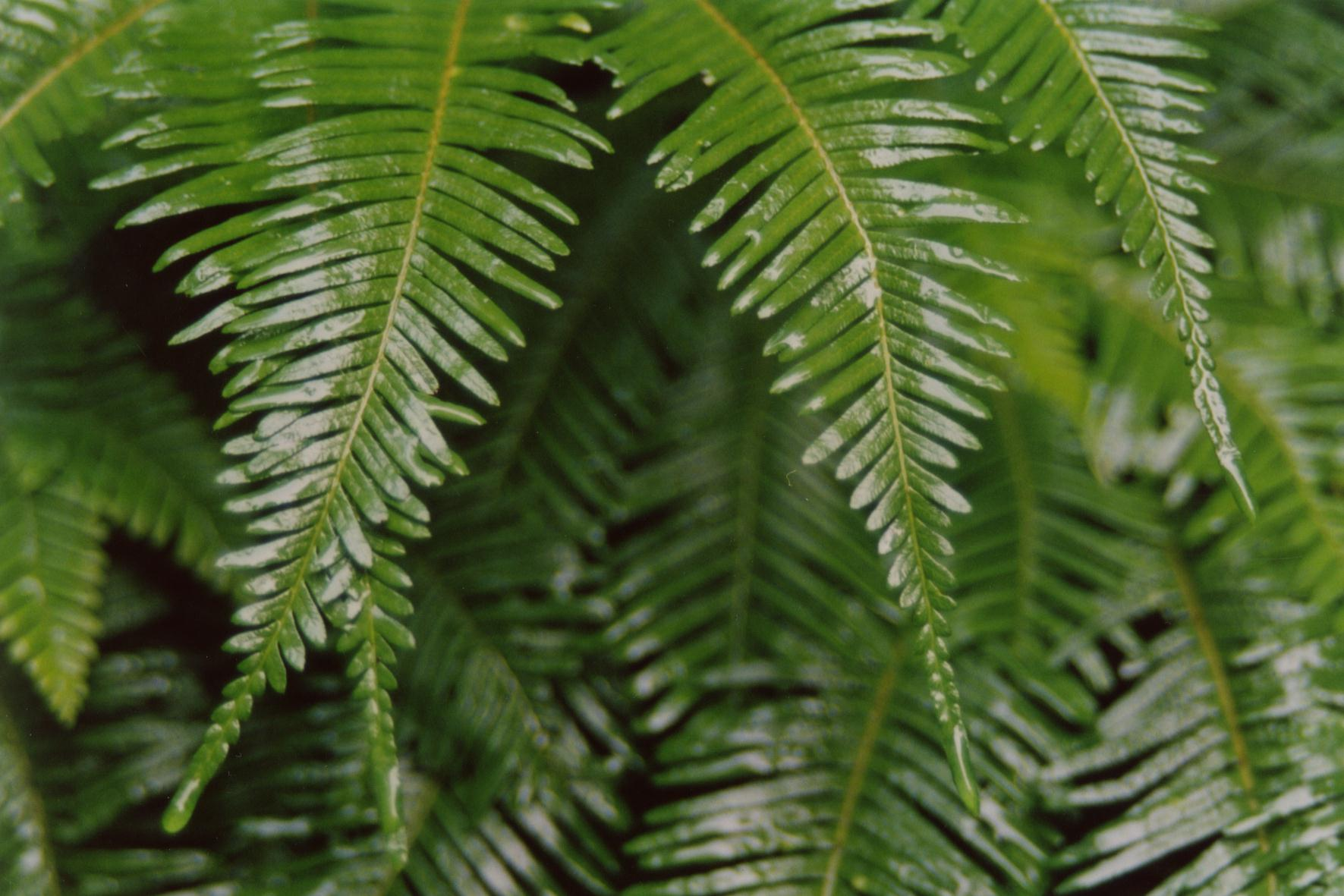

Scientific classification
- Kingdom: Plantae
- Clade: Tracheophytes
- Division: Polypodiophyta
- Class: Polypodiopsida
- Order: Polypodiales
- Suborder: Aspleniineae
- Family: Blechnaceae
- Genus: Lomaria
- Species: L. nuda

Binomial name
- Lomaria nuda (Labill.) Willd.

Synonyms
- Onoclea nuda Labill.; Blechnum nudum (Labill.) Mett.

= Lomaria nuda =

Fishbone water fern

Species of plant

Lomaria nuda, commonly known as the fishbone waterfern, is a fern that grows up to a metre tall, and is abundant in rainforest and eucalyptus forests in eastern Australia. The species is placed in the genus Lomaria in the Pteridophyte Phylogeny Group classification of 2016 (PPG I), but is often retained in genus Blechnum as Blechnum nudum.

== Habit ==
The mature fishbone waterfern typically has simple, pinnate fronds of length 40–60 cm. Fronds have a short, thick stipe that is sometimes covered in small hairs. The class of blechnum ferns are typified by having distinct fertile and sterile fronds. Fertile fronds are easily distinguishable from sterile fronds in the fishbone waterfern. Overall, sterile fronds tend to be more delicate in appearance, with a thinner longer stipe. Fertile fronds are simply pinnate, like the sterile variety, but can grow to be much longer than sterile fronds in the fishbone fern. Pinna are thin, with a rounder profile than the flat pinna of the sterile fronds. Fertile pinna are curved towards the tip of the frond, and are much shorter than sterile pinna. The longest pinna of the sterile ferns are in the middle of the frond, with length decreasing towards each end.

== Reproduction and propagation ==
The fishbone waterfern displays a life cycle typical of ferns. One feature of the Blechnaceae that differs from other ferns is distinct fertile and sterile fronds. While many ferns produce sporangia on the lower surface of fronds, meaning any frond could become fertile, Blechnaceae species have separate fronds for spore production. Aside from this main difference, the fishbone waterfern shows a typical sexual reproductive process to most ferns.

Vegetative growth is another strategy used by the fishbone waterfern to increase in number and size. The fern grows through an underground rhizomic stem, which spreads underground. Fronds emerge from beneath the ground via the stipe. Over time, one plant may spread its underground stems over a great distance. This asexual reproduction is common amongst ferns.

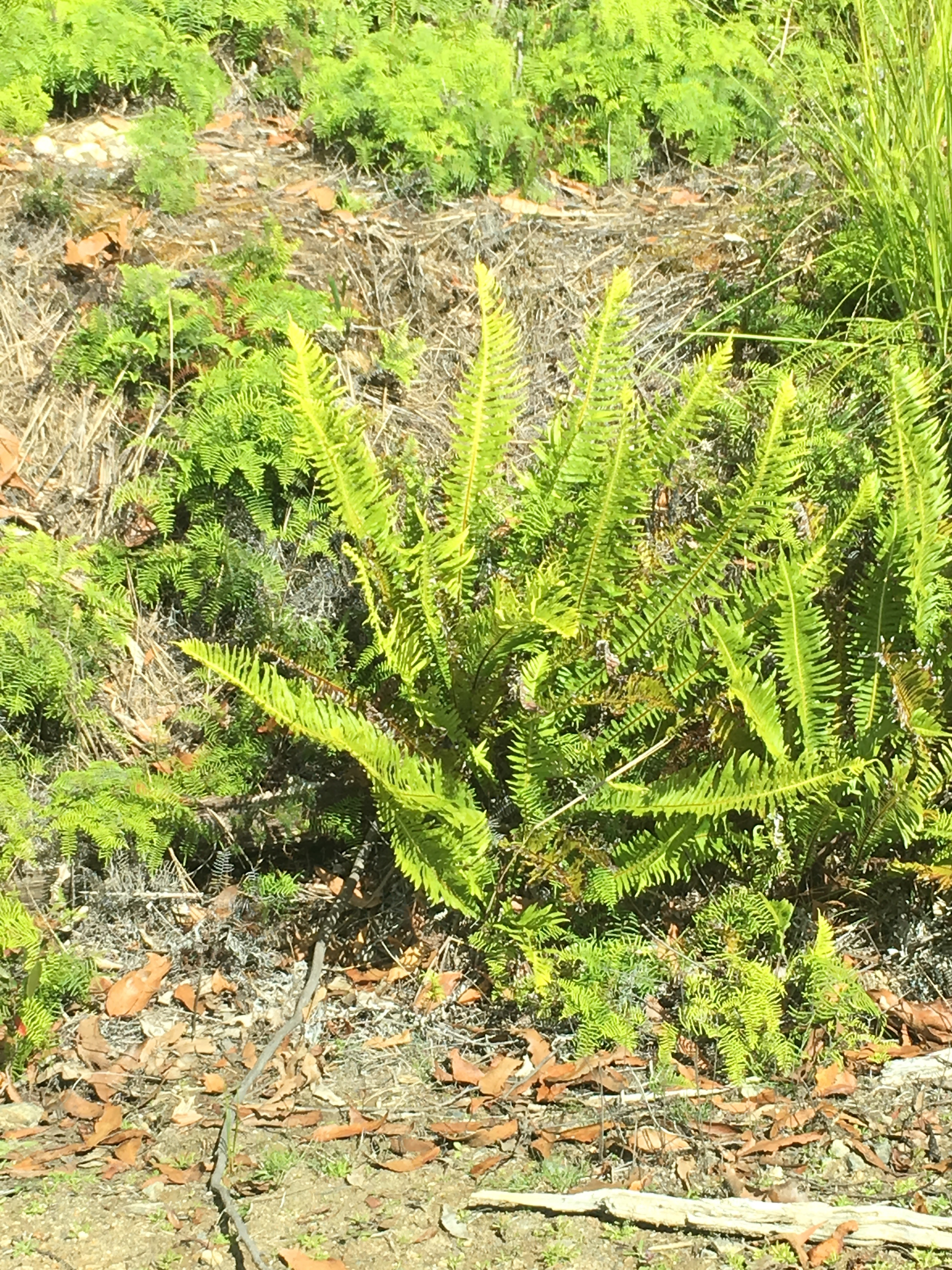
While it grows well in full shade, the fishbone waterfern will thrive in areas of full sun if enough water is available.

== Distribution and habitat ==
The fishbone water fern grows in all Australian states except for Western Australia. In most suitable habitats, this waterfern grows abundantly.

The fishbone waterfern can grow in a range of wet forests. Like many ferns, it thrives in areas of higher water availability. Because of this, the fishbone waterfern inhabits moist, poorly drained sites. Shade is an essential factor for the fishbone waterfern due to its need for water. Poorly drained soils are also important for times of lower rainfall- this allows water to be retained in the soil, available to the plant, even when rainfall is low. However, the fishbone waterfern will grow in full sun if sufficient water is available. Thus this fern will often be found growing in roadside ditches where sun is plentiful, but water pools after running off roads. Creek beds are a similar, naturally occurring high water low rainfall habitat.

Thus, two suitable habitats are rainforest and wet eucalyptus forest. Both forest types tend to be high rainfall, with a large percentage of canopy cover to ensure shade. Fertile soils allow the waterfern to propagate and become abundant in wet eucalypt and rainforests.

== Uses ==
The fishbone waterfern is commonly sold in nurseries as an ornamental plant. Its hardiness and aesthetic qualities combine to make a plant that is popular among gardeners.
