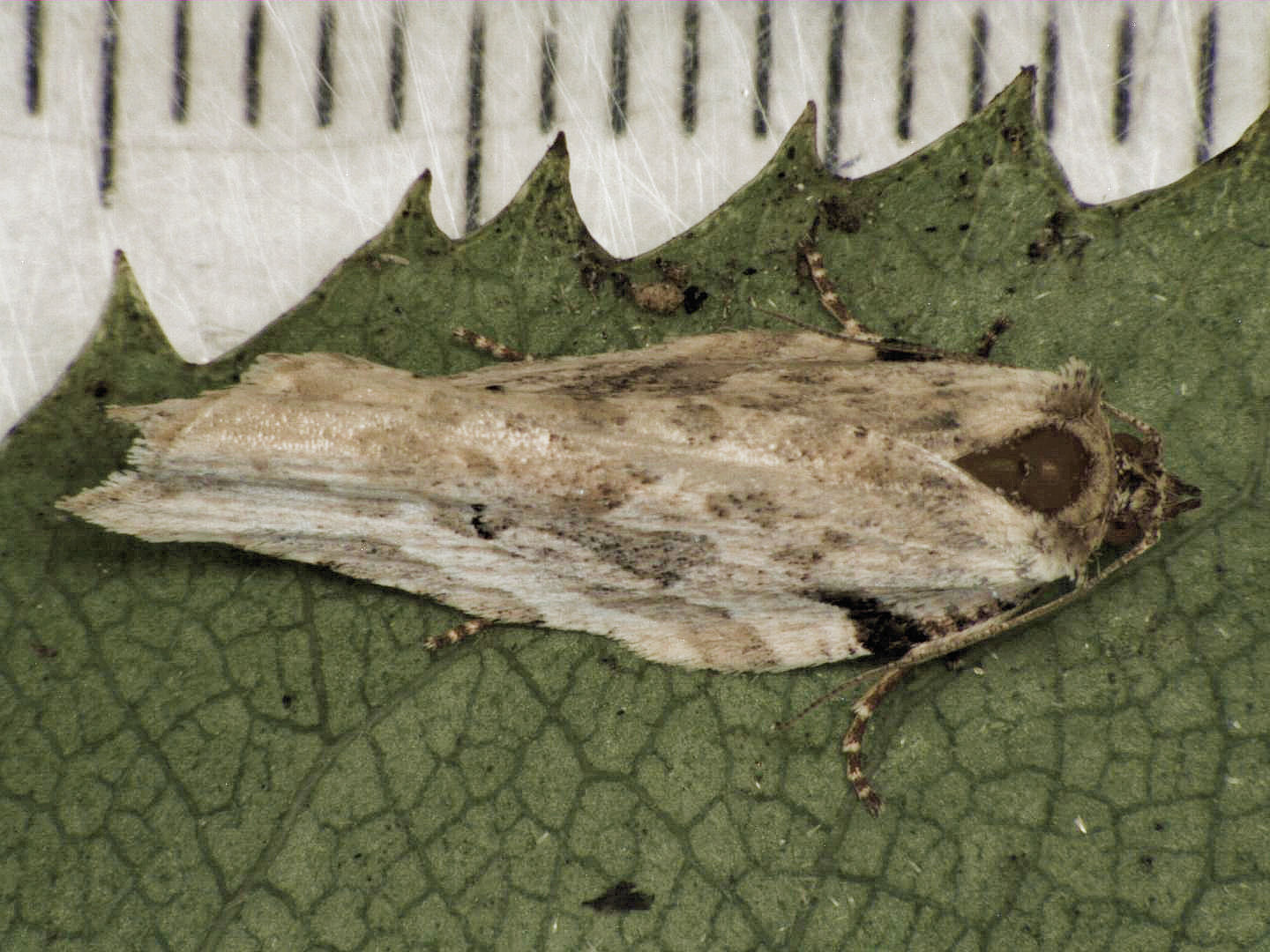
- Elpalxiphora axenana

Scientific classification
- Kingdom: Animalia
- Phylum: Arthropoda
- Class: Insecta
- Order: Lepidoptera
- Family: Tortricidae
- Tribe: Archipini
- Genus: Epalxiphora; Meyrick, 1881

= Epalxiphora =

Genus of tortrix moths

Epalxiphora is a genus of moths belonging to the subfamily Tortricinae of the family Tortricidae. This genus was first described by Edward Meyrick in 1881 and is endemic to New Zealand.

== Species ==
- Epalxiphora axenana Meyrick, 1881

== See also ==
- List of Tortricidae genera
