= Phelline =

Scientific classification
- Kingdom: Plantae
- Clade: Tracheophytes
- Clade: Angiosperms
- Clade: Eudicots
- Clade: Asterids
- Order: Asterales
- Family: Phellinaceae; Takht.
- Genus: Phelline; Labill.

Type species
- Phelline comosa Labill.

Genus of shrubs

Phelline is a genus of shrubs and the sole member of the family Phellinaceae, a family of flowering plants endemic to New Caledonia. It is placed in the order Asterales and is related to two other small plant families: Alseuosmiaceae and Argophyllaceae. It contains ten species.

== Species ==
All species in the genus are endemic to New Caledonia. The ten species are listed below.

- Phelline barrierei Barriera & Schlüssel
- Phelline billardierei Pancher ex Loes.
- Phelline brachyphylla Baill.
- Phelline comosa Labill.
- Phelline dumbeaensis Guillaumin
- Phelline erubescens Baill.
- Phelline gracilior (Loes.) Barriera
- Phelline indivisa (Baill.) Harms & Loes.
- Phelline lucida Vieill. ex Baill.
- Phelline macrophylla Baill.
