= Hamilton Ecological District =

Coordinates: 37.7°S 175.3°E

Hamilton Ecological District is part of the Waikato Ecological Region in New Zealand's North Island. It occupies the Hamilton basin and surrounding foothills, and has been heavily modified with less than two percent of its indigenous vegetation remaining. This location has been studied significantly including the process of restoration ecology.

C. Michael Hogan has classified the undisturbed portions of the woodland area as a beech and podocarp forest with associate understory ferns being Icarus filiformis, Asplenium flaccidum, Doodia media, Hymenophyllum demissum, Zealandia pustulata and Dendroconche scandens, and some prominent associate shrubs being Olearia ranii and Alseuosmia quercifolia.

== See also ==
- Metrosideros
