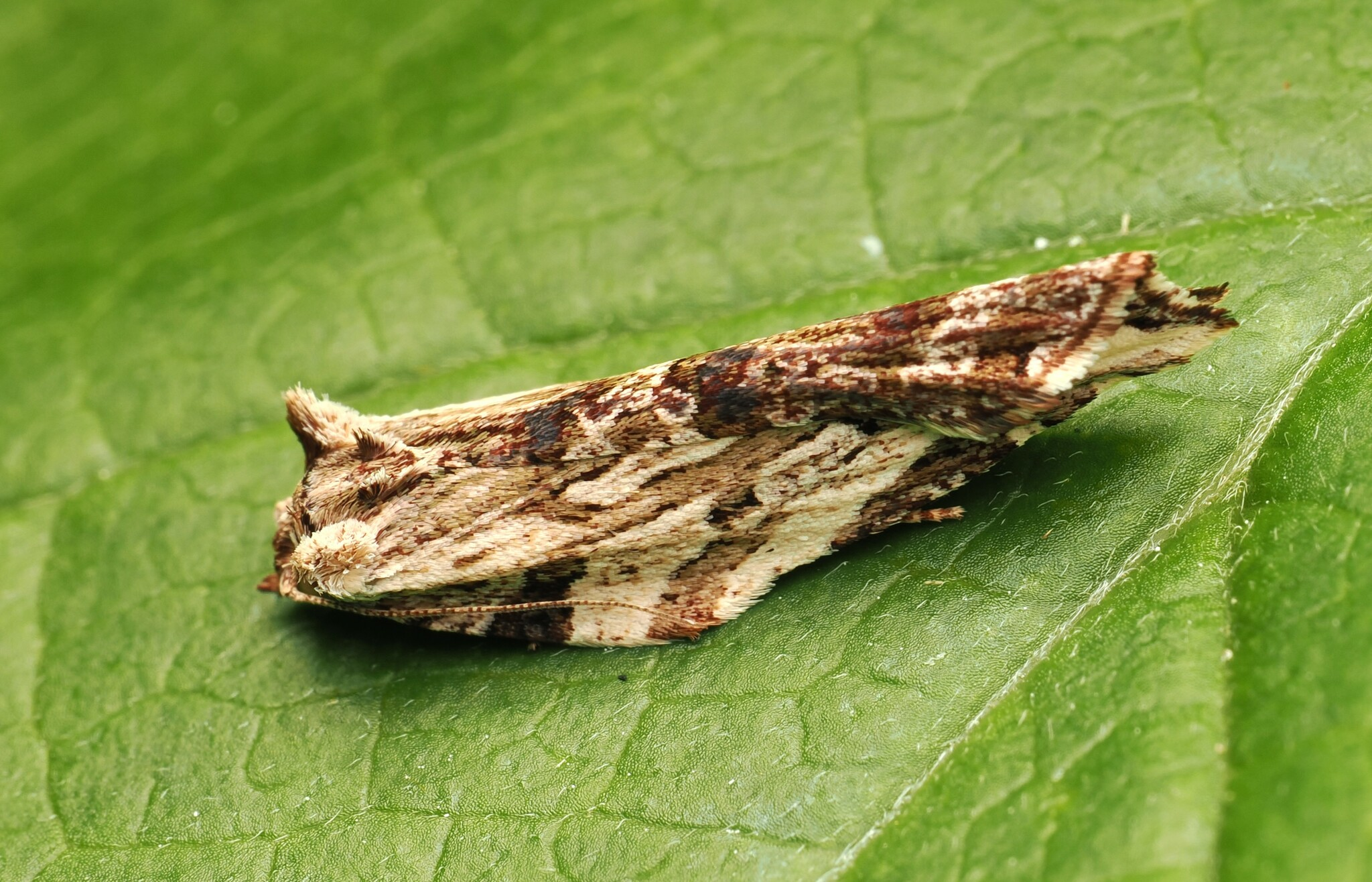

Scientific classification
- Kingdom: Animalia
- Phylum: Arthropoda
- Class: Insecta
- Order: Lepidoptera
- Family: Tortricidae
- Genus: Epalxiphora
- Species: E. axenana

Binomial name
- Epalxiphora axenana Meyrick, 1881

= Epalxiphora axenana =

Species of moth endemic to New Zealand

Epalxiphora axenana, the brindled bell or sharp-tipped bell moth, is a species of moth of the family Tortricidae. It was first described by Edward Meyrick in 1881. It is endemic to New Zealand and is found throughout the North Island and in the South Island districts of Nelson, Buller and Westland. This species is strongly sexually dimorphic and has unusually shaped forewings which can assist with identification. Adults are variable in appearance. This species inhabits native forest with larvae feeding on a range of native shrubs as well as citrus species. Adults are on the wing throughout the year but are most frequently observed during New Zealand summer months. They are nocturnal and are attracted to light.

== Taxonomy ==
E. axenana was first described by Edward Meyrick in 1881 using one specimen taken at rest on a tree trunk near Wellington in January. In 1905 Ambrose Quail published a detailed life history of this species. George Hudson discussed and illustrated this species in his 1928 book The butterflies and moths of New Zealand. The female holotype is held at the Natural History Museum, London. John S. Dugdale points out that the female holotype has attached to it via glue the metathorax, hindwings, and abdomen of a male specimen.

== Description ==
The larvae of this species are semi transparent green in colour, with no appreciable markings other than on their head which is yellowish with brown mottling or stripes. Adults are strongly sexually dimorphic.

Hudson described the adults of this species in detail. He states:

The expansion of the wings of the male varies from slightly over 3/4 inch to 1 1/8 inches; of the female from slightly under 1 inch to 1 1/4 inches. The fore-wings in the male have the apex slightly hooked and the termen strongly bowed; the general colour varies from pale ochreous-brown to dull purplish-grey; the costa is broadly shaded with dark brown, darkest near the middle and usually enclosing an oval paler patch; in the purplish varieties there is often a large reddish patch just below the costa; there is nearly always a narrow pale brown or yellowish patch on the apex and usually a number of dark brownish marks on the dorsum. The hind-wings are pale grey obscurely mottled with darker grey.

Hudson goes into more detail for the female of the species stating:

The female has the fore-wings considerably longer and narrower, the costa elbowed at 1/3, the apex more strongly hooked, and the colouring and markings much more variable than in the male; the usual ground colour is pdle brownish-ochreous or bone colour; there is a dark brown oblong mark on the costa at one-sixth almost meeting a pale brown wavy band on the dorsum at about 1/4; a narrow pale brown band on the costa at 1/3 almost meets a large patch of the same colour on the dorsum which reaches to the tornus; there is a narrow, irregular, edging of brown on the costa from about 1/2 nearly to the apex, leaving a narrow, oblique apical band of the pale ground colour; the termen is more or less distinctly bordered with pale brown. The hind-wings are very pale ochreous, faintly mottled with grey.

The unusual shape of this moth's forewings can assist in identifying this species.

== Some forms of this species ==
Adults of this species are variable in appearance.

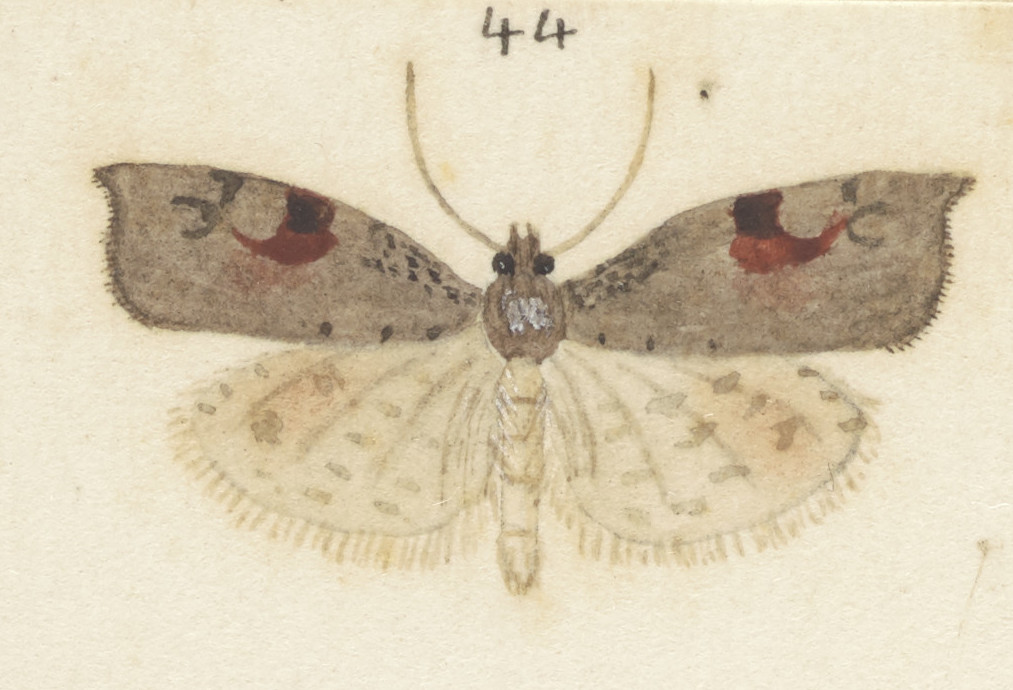

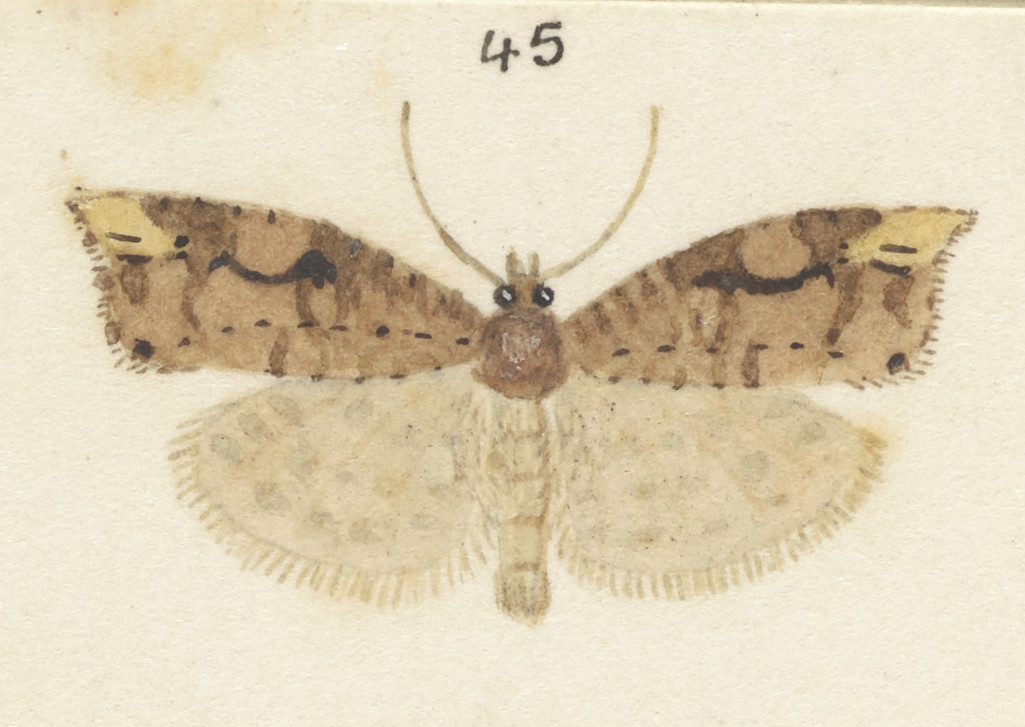

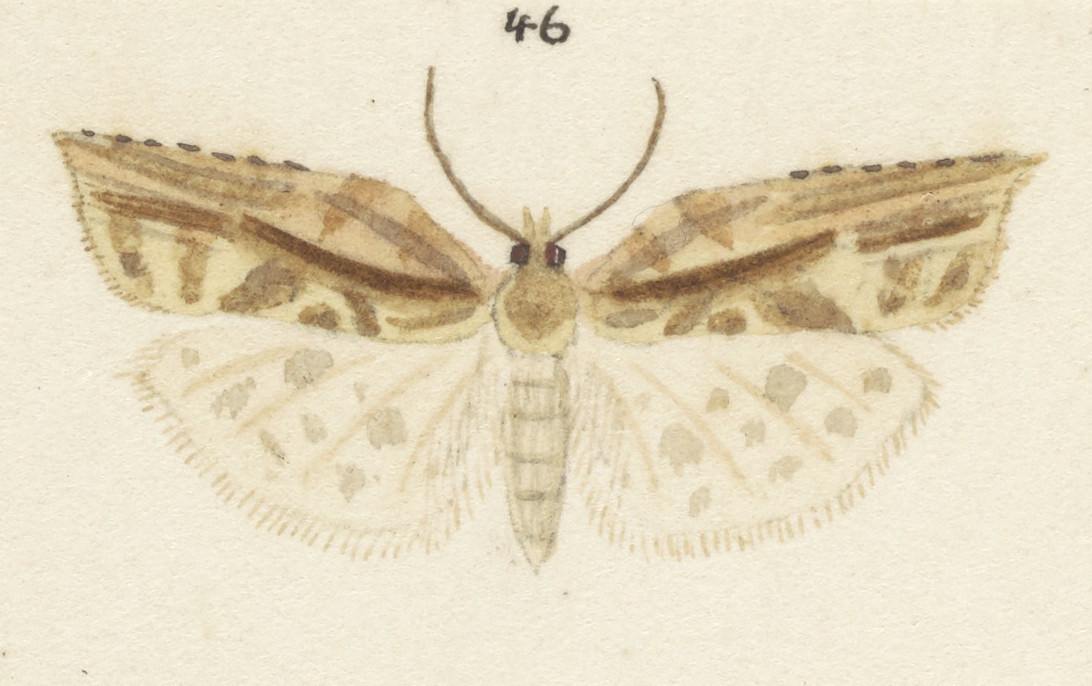

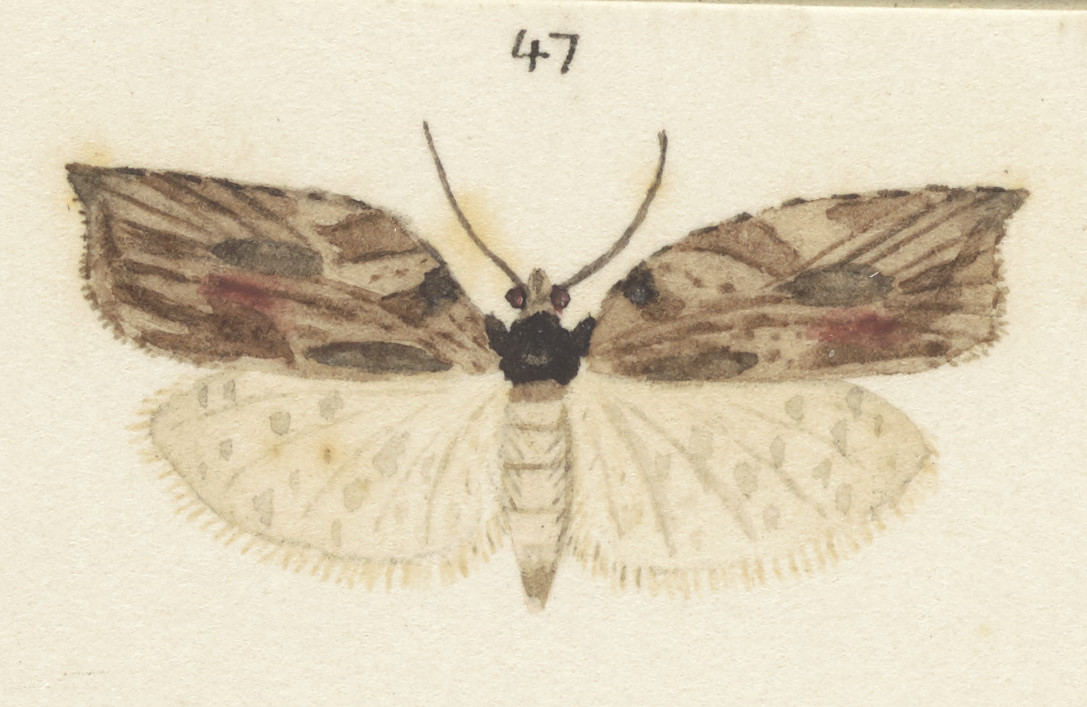

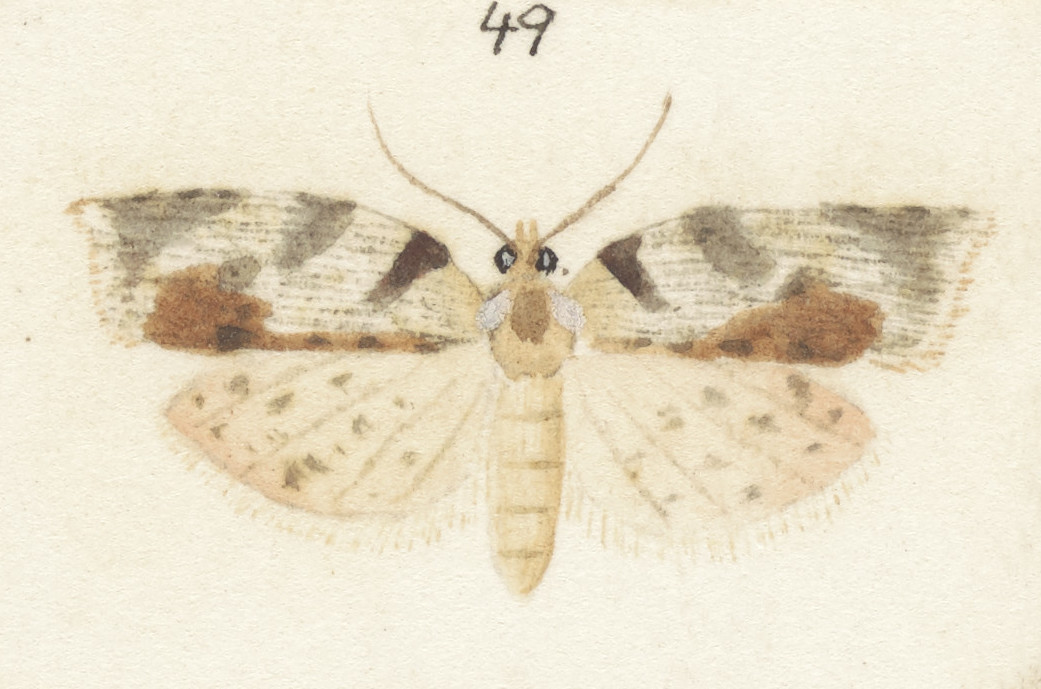

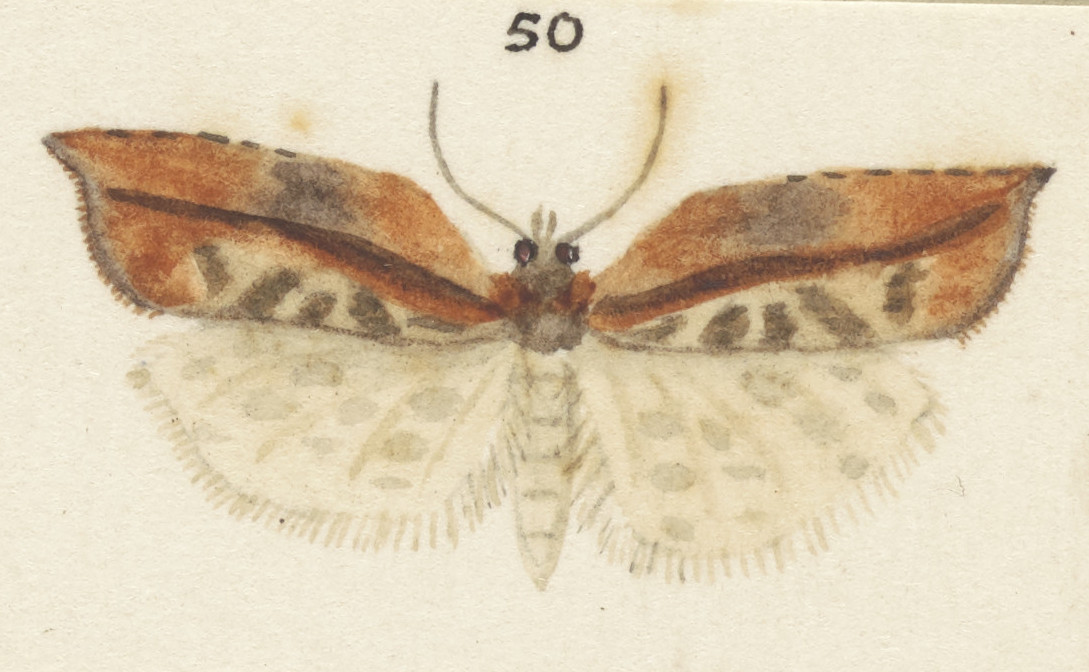

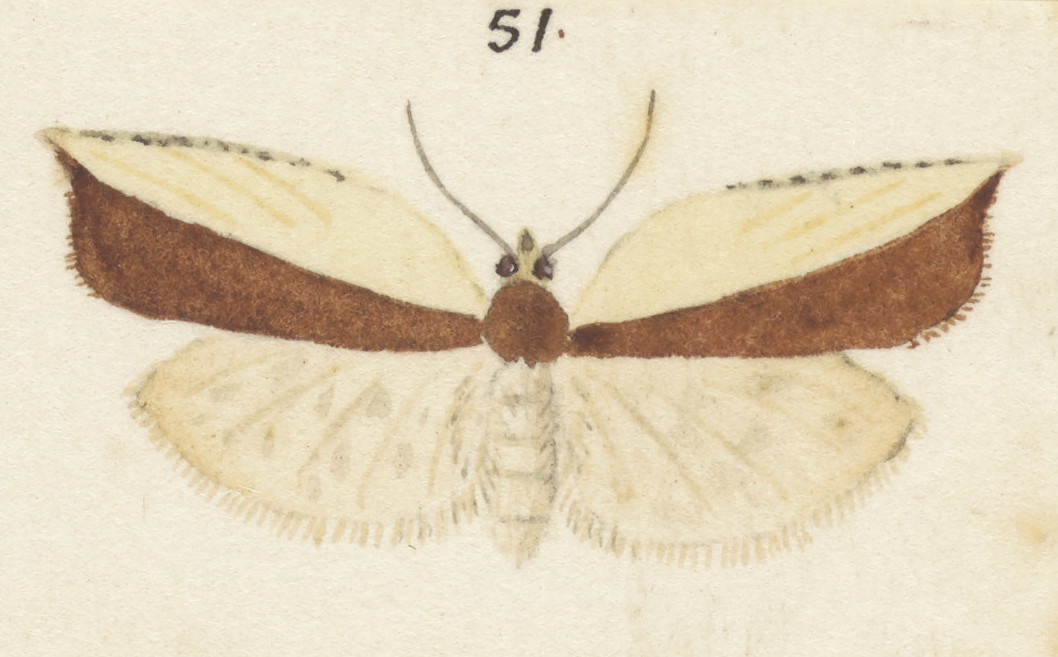

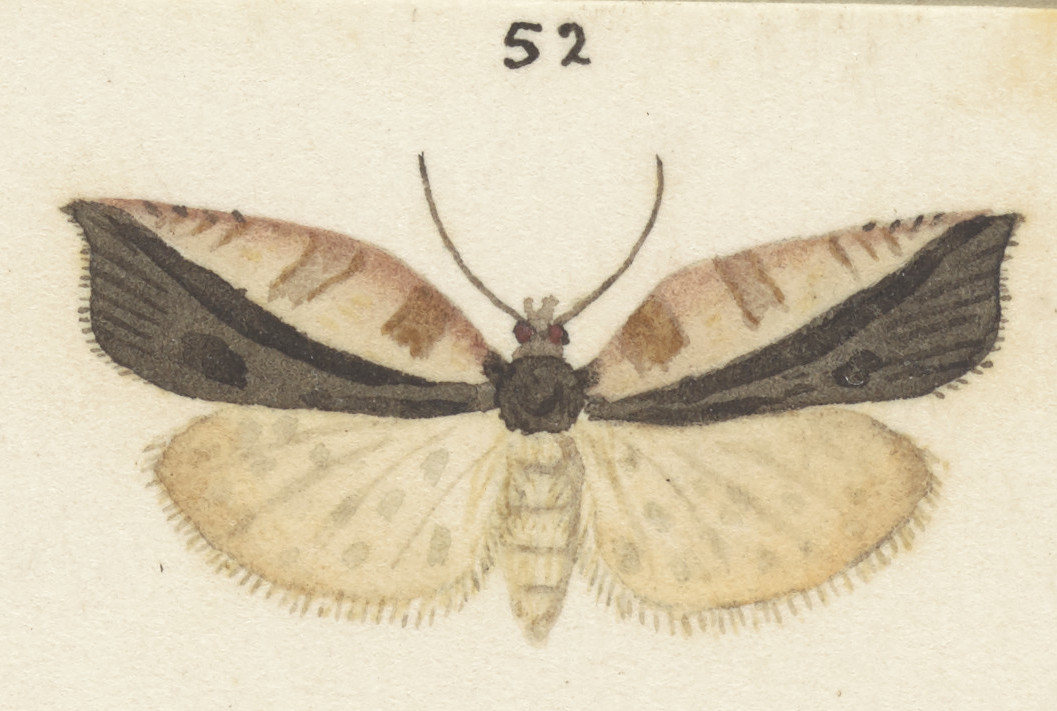

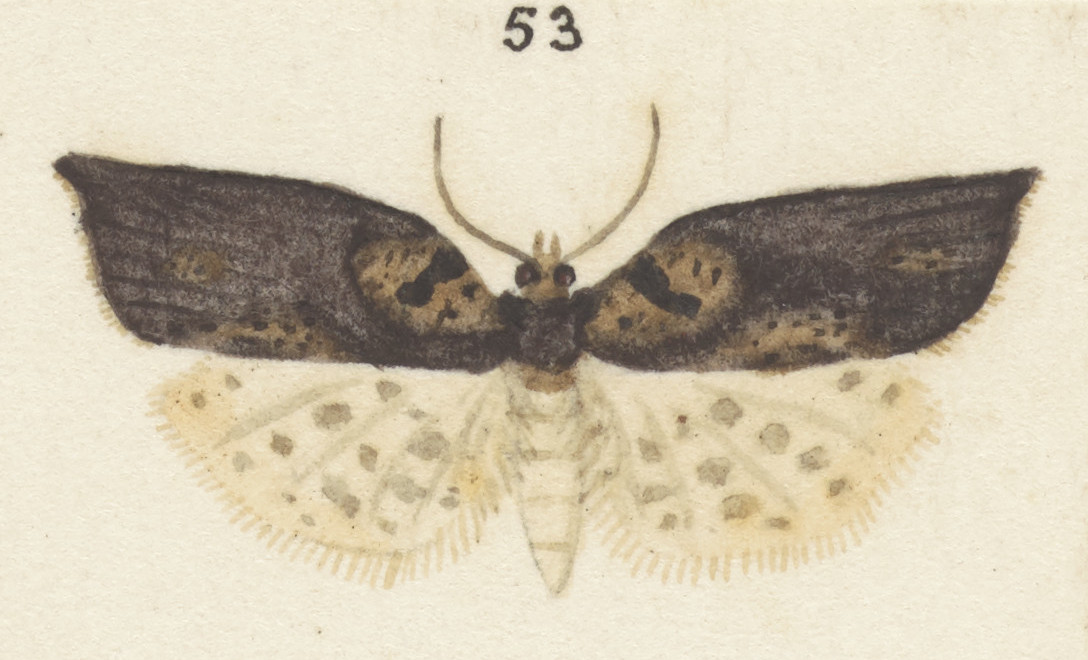

== Distribution ==
This species is endemic to New Zealand. This species was regarded as being endemic to the North Island but since the mid-1980s it has been present in the South Island, likely transported on horticultural plants or garden shrubs. It can now be found in the South Island regions of Nelson, Buller and Westland.

== Habitat and hosts ==
The preferred habitat of this species is native forest. Larvae feed on a wide variety of shrubs including Griselinia littoralis, Myrsine salicina, Piper excelsum, Didymocheton spectabilis as well as Citrus species.

== Life history and behaviour ==
Adult females lay approximately 30 eggs in a circular, semi transparent mass. Each egg is oval in shape and is slightly convex above. Newly hatched larvae do not eat their egg shells but feed on the underside of the leaves of their host plants beneath a few strands of silk. When more mature, the larvae hide between and feed from spun leaves of their host plants. They can be easily alarmed and drop to the ground as a defensive mechanism. E. axenana exist in their larval state for 30 to 32 days. Pupation takes place close to the feeding place of the larva and pupation last between 17 and 29 days. Adults have been observed on the wing throughout the year but are most commonly come across in the summer months of November until February. Hudson states that adult females of this species can be found resting on the upper surface of a leaf of its foodplant when its appearance is suggestive of a small crumpled dead leaf adhering to a green leaf. Adults are nocturnal and are attracted to light.
