= Robert Virot =

French botanist

Robert Virot (10 August 1915 in Paris; 10 March 2002 Le Buisson-de-Cadouin, Dordogne) was a French botanist.

He obtained a doctorate in science from Paris University in 1956. He lived in New Caledonia from 1936 to 1947. He then returned to France were here worked for the CNRS at the Muséum national d'histoire naturelle

His PhD thesis published as "La végétation canaque" in 1956 is one of the first major ecological studies of the flora of New Caledonia. He also wrote taxonomic monographs of Proteaceae and Epacridaceae (=Ericaceae) from New Caledonia as parts of the series flore de la Nouvelle-Calédonie.

The standard author abbreviation Virot is used to indicate this person as the author when citing a botanical name.
