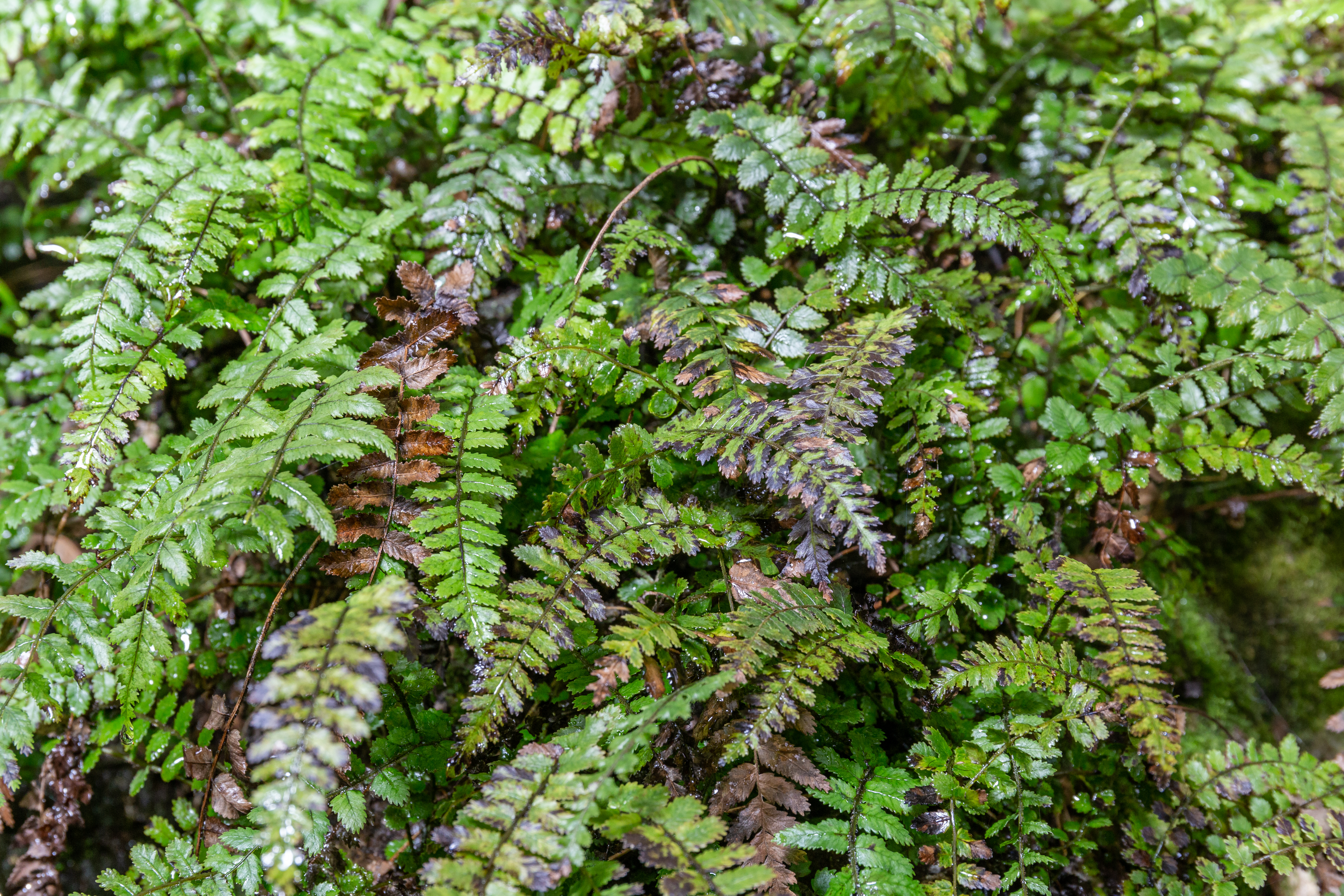
- Icarus filiformis in Christchurch Botanic Gardens

Scientific classification
- Kingdom: Plantae
- Clade: Tracheophytes
- Division: Polypodiophyta
- Class: Polypodiopsida
- Order: Polypodiales
- Suborder: Aspleniineae
- Family: Blechnaceae
- Genus: Icarus; Gasper & Salino
- Species: I. filiformis

Binomial name
- Icarus filiformis (A.Cunn.) Gasper & Salino

Synonyms
- Blechnum filiforme (A.Cunn.) Ettingsh.; Blechnum reptans (Banks & Sol. ex G.Forst.) Luerss.; Lomaria filiformis A.Cunn.; Lomaria pimpinellifolia Hook.f.; Lomaria propinqua A.Cunn.; Lomariopsis heteromorpha (Sm.) T.Moore; Osmunda reptans Banks & Sol.ex G.Forst.; Spicanta filiformis (A.Cunn.) Kuntze; Stenochlaena feejeensis Brack.; Stenochlaena heteromorpha J.Sm.; Struthiopteris filiformis (A.Cunn.) Ching

= Icarus filiformis =

Species of fern

Icarus is a genus of ferns in the family Blechnaceae, subfamily Blechnoideae, with a single species Icarus filiformis, according to the Pteridophyte Phylogeny Group classification of 2016 (PPG I). The genus is accepted in a 2016 classification of the family Blechnaceae, but other sources sink it into a very broadly defined Blechnum, equivalent to the whole of the PPG I subfamily.

Icarus filiformis, synonym Blechnum filiforme, is known as thread fern or pānoko in Māori. It is endemic to New Zealand. It has a creeping and climbing habit. It has three different types of fronds: long climbing fronds with long pointed leaves, shorter creeping fronds with nearly round leaves, and fertile fronds with threadlike leaves that give the species its common name.
