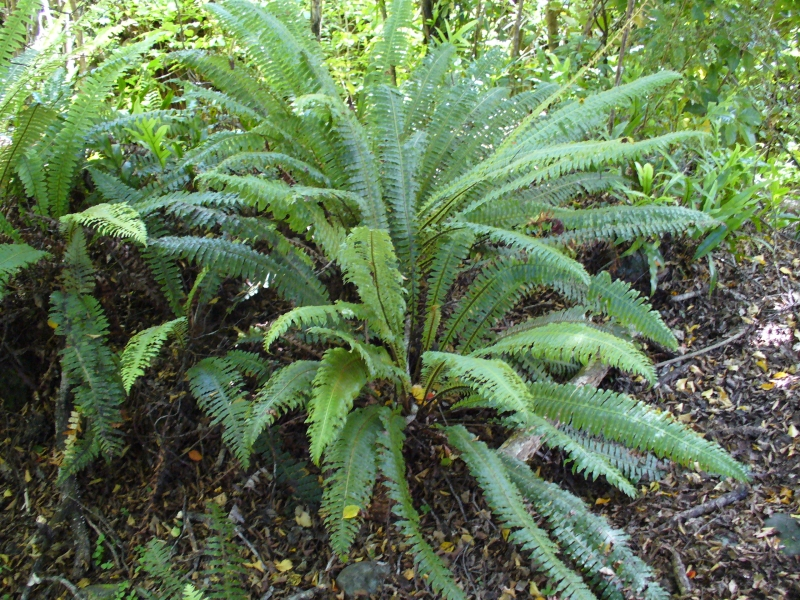
- Growing near the Buller River, New Zealand

Scientific classification
- Kingdom: Plantae
- Clade: Tracheophytes
- Division: Polypodiophyta
- Class: Polypodiopsida
- Order: Polypodiales
- Suborder: Aspleniineae
- Family: Blechnaceae
- Genus: Lomaria
- Species: L. discolor

Binomial name
- Lomaria discolor (G.Forst.) Willd.

Synonyms
- Acrostichum rufum Spreng.; Gymnopteris discolor (G.Forst.) Bernh.; Hemionitis discolor (G.Forst.) Schkuhr; Blechnum discolor (G.Forst.) Keyserl.; Lomaria falcata Spreng.; Onoclea discolor (G.Forst.) Sw.; Osmunda discolor G.Forst.; Spicanta discolor (G.Forst.) Kuntze; Stegania discolor (G.Forst.) A.Rich.; Struthiopteris discolor (G.Forst.) Ching

= Lomaria discolor =

Crown fern

Species of fern

Lomaria discolor, synonym Blechnum discolor, commonly called crown fern (Māori: piupiu), is a species of fern in the family Blechnaceae. This species is endemic to New Zealand. As noted by C. Michael Hogan, this species is found in a number of forest communities in diverse locations within New Zealand, and is sometimes a dominant understorey component.

Spores are produced on specialised fronds. These are more erect, with a dark and shrivelled look.
