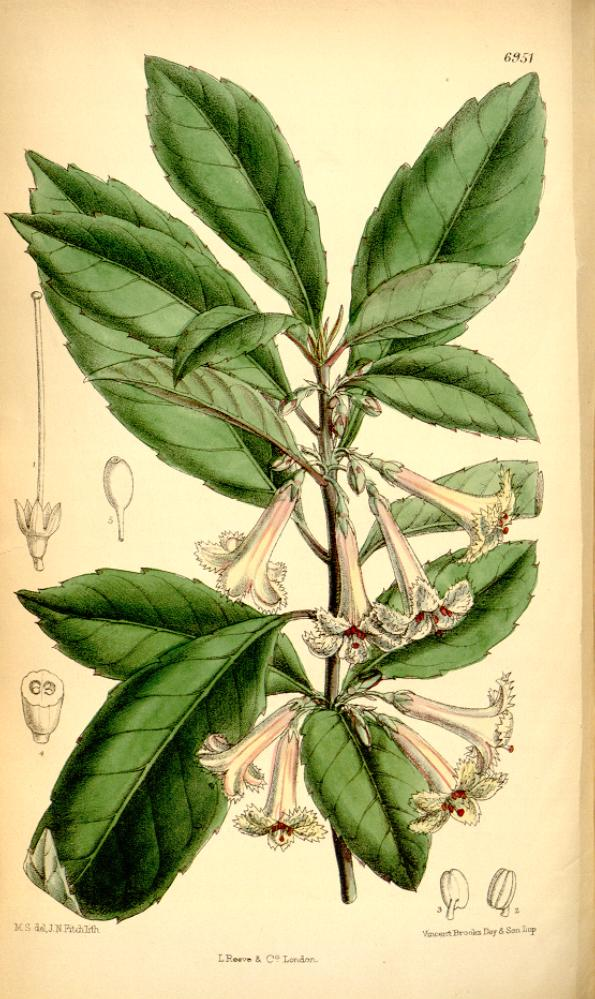
- Alseuosmia macrophylla

Scientific classification
- Kingdom: Plantae
- Clade: Tracheophytes
- Clade: Angiosperms
- Clade: Eudicots
- Clade: Asterids
- Order: Asterales
- Family: Alseuosmiaceae; Airy Shaw

Type genus
- Alseuosmia A. Cunn.

Genera
- 4, see text

= Alseuosmiaceae =

Family of flowering plants

Alseuosmiaceae is a plant family of the order Asterales found in Australia, New Caledonia, New Zealand, and New Guinea.

They are shrubs with leaves arranged in spirals or whorls about the stem. The flowers are solitary or borne in raceme or fascicle inflorescences. Some species have fragrant flowers. The flower corolla is urn-shaped or funnel-shaped with 4 to 7 lobes. There are 4 to 7 stamens and one style tipped with a two-lobed stigma. The fruit is a fleshy berry.

There are 11 species divided among 4 genera:

- Alseuosmia
- Crispiloba
- Platyspermation
- Wittsteinia
