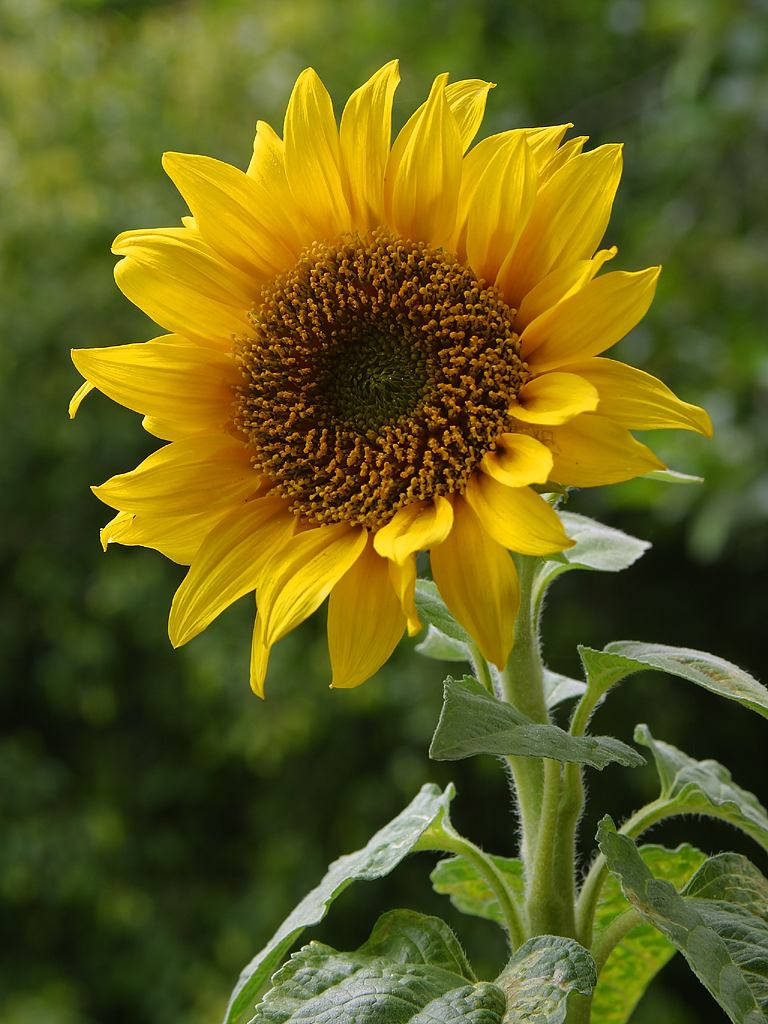
- Sunflower, Helianthus annuus

Scientific classification
- Kingdom: Plantae
- Clade: Tracheophytes
- Clade: Angiosperms
- Clade: Eudicots
- Clade: Asterids
- Clade: Campanulids
- Order: Asterales; Link

Families
- Alseuosmiaceae; Argophyllaceae; Asteraceae - Asters; Calyceraceae; Campanulaceae (incl. Lobeliaceae) - Bellflowers; Goodeniaceae (incl. Brunoniaceae); Menyanthaceae; Pentaphragmataceae; Phellinaceae; Rousseaceae (incl. Carpodetaceae); Stylidiaceae (incl. Donatiaceae)

= Asterales =

Large order of flowering plants

Asterales (/ˌæstəˈreɪliːz/ ASS-tər-RAY-leez) is an order of dicotyledonous flowering plants that includes the large family Asteraceae (or Compositae) known for composite flowers made of florets, and ten families related to the Asteraceae. While asterids in general are characterized by fused petals, composite flowers consisting of many florets create the false appearance of separate petals (as found in the rosids).

The order is cosmopolitan (plants found throughout most of the world including desert and frigid zones), and includes mostly herbaceous species, although a small number of trees (such as the Lobelia deckenii, the giant lobelia, and Dendrosenecio, giant groundsels) and shrubs are also present.

Asterales are organisms that seem to have evolved from one common ancestor. Asterales share characteristics on morphological and biochemical levels. Synapomorphies (a character that is shared by two or more groups through evolutionary development) include the presence in the plants of oligosaccharide inulin, a nutrient storage molecule used instead of starch; and unique stamen morphology. The stamens are usually found around the style, either aggregated densely or fused into a tube, probably an adaptation in association with the plunger (brush; or secondary) pollination that is common among the families of the order, wherein pollen is collected and stored on the length of the pistil.

== Taxonomy ==
The name and order Asterales is botanically venerable, dating back to at least 1926 in the Hutchinson system of plant taxonomy when it contained only five families, of which only two are retained in the APG III classification. Under the Cronquist system of taxonomic classification of flowering plants, Asteraceae was the only family in the group, but newer systems (such as APG II and APG III) have expanded it to 11. In the classification system of Rolf Dahlgren the Asterales were in the superorder Asteriflorae (also called Asteranae).

The order Asterales currently includes 11 families, the largest of which are the Asteraceae, with about 25,000 species, and the Campanulaceae (bellflowers), with about 2,000 species. The remaining families count together for less than 1500 species. The two large families are cosmopolitan, with many of their species found in the Northern Hemisphere, and the smaller families are usually confined to Australia and the adjacent areas, or sometimes South America.

Only the Asteraceae have composite flower heads; the other families do not, but share other characteristics such as storage of inulin that define the 11 families as more closely related to each other than to other plant families or orders such as the rosids.

The phylogenetic tree according to APG III for the Campanulid clade is as below.

- Campanulid clade (similar to Euasterids II in APG II)
  - Aquifoliales
  - - - Bruniales
      - - - Paracryphiales
          - Dipsacales
        - Apiales
    - Escalloniales
    - Asterales

=== Phylogeny ===
Although most extant species of Asteraceae are herbaceous, the examination of the basal members in the family suggests that the common ancestor of the family was an arborescent plant, a tree or shrub, perhaps adapted to dry conditions, radiating from South America. Less can be said about the Asterales themselves with certainty, although since several families in Asterales contain trees, the ancestral member is most likely to have been a tree or shrub.

Because all clades are represented in the Southern Hemisphere but many not in the Northern Hemisphere, it is natural to conjecture that there is a common southern origin to them. Asterales belong to angiosperms or flowering plants, a clade that appeared about 140 million years ago. The Asterales order probably originated in the Cretaceous (145 – 66 Mya) on the supercontinent Gondwana which broke up from 184 – 80 Mya, forming the area that is now Australia, South America, Africa, India and Antarctica.

Asterales contain about 14% of eudicot diversity. From an analysis of relationships and diversities within the Asterales and with their superorders, estimates of the age of the beginning of the Asterales have been made, which range from 116 Mya to 82 Mya. However few fossils have been found, of the Menyanthaceae-Asteraceae clade in the Oligocene, about 29 Mya.

Fossil evidence of the Asterales is rare and belongs to rather recent epochs, so the precise estimation of the order's age is quite difficult. An Oligocene (34 – 23 Mya) pollen is known for Asteraceae and Goodeniaceae, and seeds from Oligocene and Miocene (23 – 5.3 Mya) are known for Menyanthaceae and Campanulaceae respectively. According to molecular clock calculations, the lineage that led to Asterales split from other plants about 112 million years ago or 94 million years ago.

== Biogeography ==
The core Asterales are Stylidiaceae (six genera), APA clade (Alseuosmiaceae, Phellinaceae and Argophyllaceae, together seven genera), MGCA clade (Menyanthaceae, Goodeniaceae, Calyceraceae, in total twenty genera), and Asteraceae (about sixteen hundred genera). Other Asterales are Rousseaceae (four genera), Campanulaceae (eighty-four genera) and Pentaphragmataceae (one genus).

All Asterales families are represented in the Southern Hemisphere; however, Asteraceae and Campanulaceae are cosmopolitan and Menyanthaceae nearly so.

== Uses ==
The Asterales, by dint of being a super-set of the family Asteraceae, include some species grown for food, including the sunflower (Helianthus annuus), lettuce (Lactuca sativa) and chicory (Cichorium). Many are also used as spices and traditional medicines.

Asterales are common plants and have many known uses. For example, pyrethrum (derived from Old World members of the genus Chrysanthemum) is a natural insecticide with minimal environmental impact. Wormwood, derived from a genus that includes the sagebrush, is used as a source of flavoring for absinthe, a bitter classical liquor of European origin.
