= Conservation parks of New Zealand =

Type of protected area in New Zealand

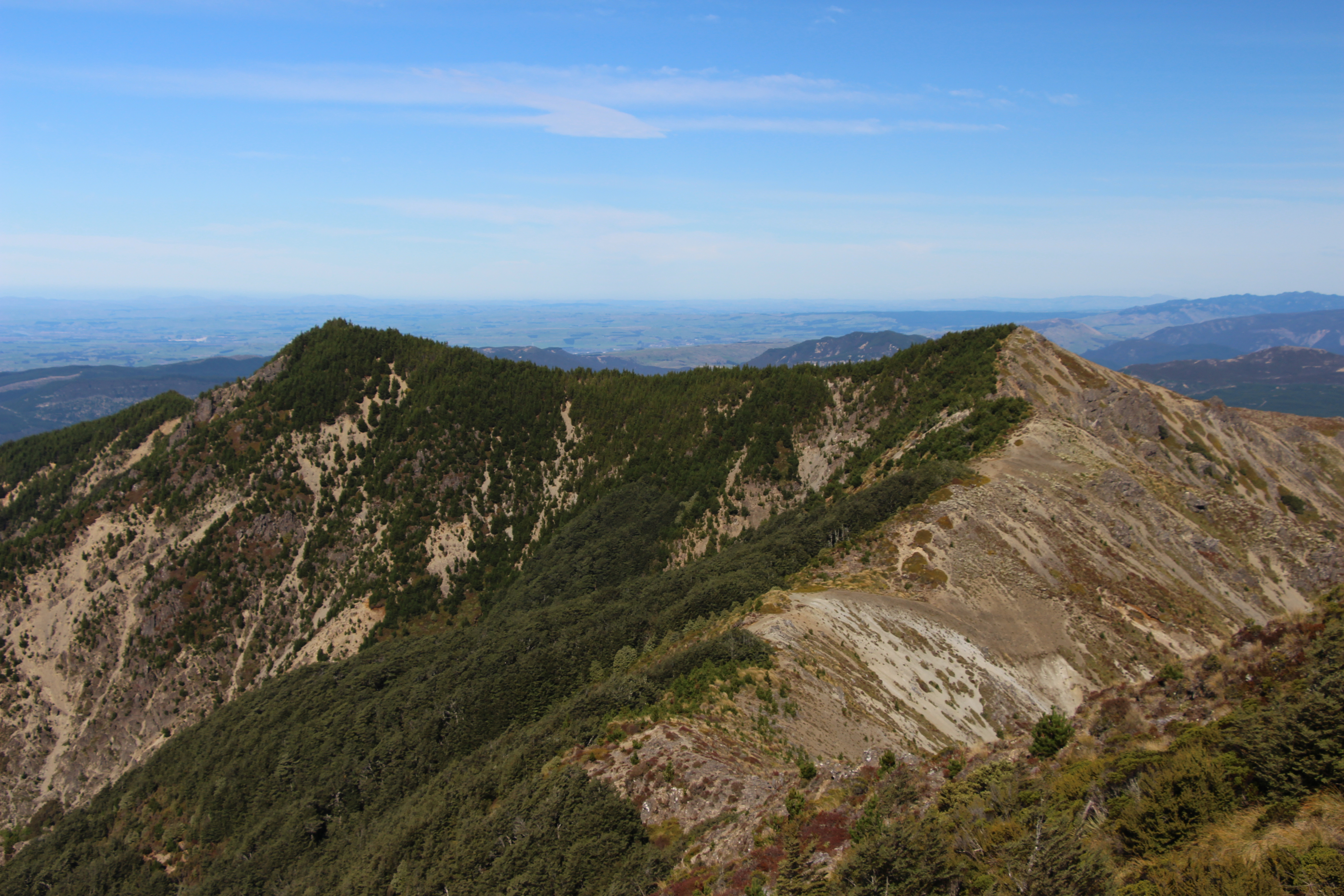
Kaweka Forest Park

Conservation park is a type of protected status for land held by the Crown in New Zealand for conservation purposes. Conservation parks are managed to protect their natural and historic resources, and to provide for public recreation, subject to their conservation purposes. They have a less stringent level of protection than national parks. The status was created under the Conservation Act 1987 and the parks are administered by the Department of Conservation (DoC).

Forest parks were created under the Forests Act 1949, with first being Tararua Forest Park, established in 1954. They were transferred to DOC administration in 1987, becoming conservation parks, although 'forest park' is still retained in the names of many of them.

As of September 2020, there were 54 conservation parks in New Zealand (including 36 named as forest parks), covering an area of 2,690,191 hectares.

== Conservation parks that are named as forest parks ==
- Aorangi Forest Park
- Coromandel Forest Park
- Craigieburn Forest Park
- Hanmer Forest Park
- Herekino Forest Park
- Houto Forest Park
- Hukerenui Forest Park
- Kaihu Forest Park
- Kaiikanui Forest Park
- Kaimanawa Forest Park
- Kaweka Forest Park
- Lake Sumner Forest Park
- Marlborough Forest Park
- Mataraua Forest Park
- Maungataniwha Forest Park
- Mount Richmond Forest Park
- North-west Nelson Forest Park
- Omahuta Forest Park
- Opua Forest Park
- Pirongia Forest Park
- Pukenui Forest Park
- Puketi Forest Park
- Pureora Forest Park
- Raetea Forest Park
- Remutaka Forest Park
- Ruahine Forest Park
- Ruapekapeka Forest Park
- Russell Forest Park
- Tangihua Forest Park
- Tararua Forest Park
- Victoria Forest Park
- Waikino Forest Park
- Waima Forest Park
- Waipoua Forest
- Warawara Forest Park
- Whakarewarewa State Forest Park

== Other conservation parks ==
There are 18 other conservation parks in New Zealand. These include some that formerly had 'Forest Park' in their name, for instance, the former 'Whirinaki Forest Park', which became the Whirinaki Te Pua-a-Tāne Conservation Park in 2010.

- Ahuriri Conservation Park
- Aotea Conservation Park
- Catlins Conservation Park
- Eyre Mountains/Taka Rā Haka Conservation Park
- Hakatere Conservation Park
- Hāwea Conservation Park
- Ka Whata Tu o Rakihouia Conservation Park
- Kaimai Mamaku Conservation Park
- Korowai/Torlesse Tussocklands Conservation Park
- Onekaka River Conservation Park
- Oteake Conservation Park
- Raukumara Conservation Park
- Ruataniwha Conservation Park
- Russell Forest Conservation Park
- Te Kahui Kaupeka Conservation Park
- Te Papanui Conservation Park
- Whirinaki Te Pua-a-Tāne Conservation Park
- Wires Road Access Conservation Park

== See also ==
- Protected areas of New Zealand
