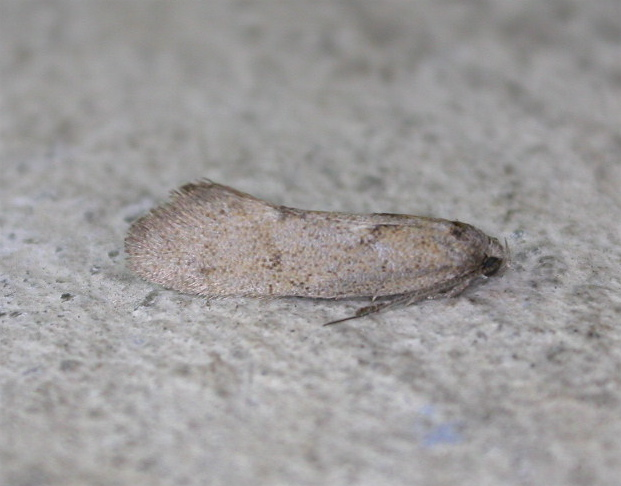

Scientific classification
- Kingdom: Animalia
- Phylum: Arthropoda
- Class: Insecta
- Order: Lepidoptera
- Family: Oecophoridae
- Genus: Tingena
- Species: T. marcida

Binomial name
- Tingena marcida (Philpott, 1927)

Synonyms
- Borkhausenia marcida Philpott, 1927

= Tingena marcida =

Species of moth, endemic to New Zealand

Tingena marcida is a species of moth in the family Oecophoridae. It is endemic to New Zealand and has been observed in Canterbury. Adults are on the wing in September and October.

== Taxonomy ==
This species was described by Alfred Philpott in 1927 using specimens collected at Bottle Lake in Christchurch by Stewart Lindsay and named Borkhausenia marcida. George Hudson discussed this species under that name in his 1928 publication The Moths and Butterflies of New Zealand. In 1988 John S. Dugdale assigned this species to the genus Tingena. The holotype specimen is held at the Canterbury Museum.

== Description ==
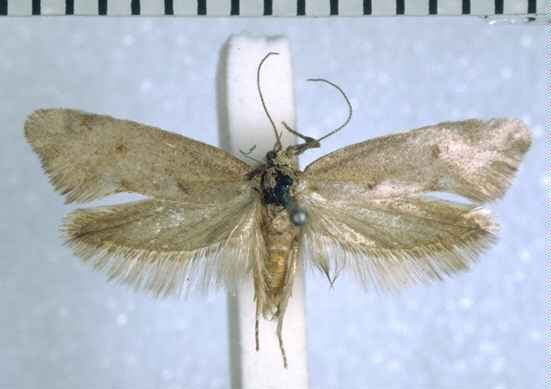
Tingena marcida male holotype

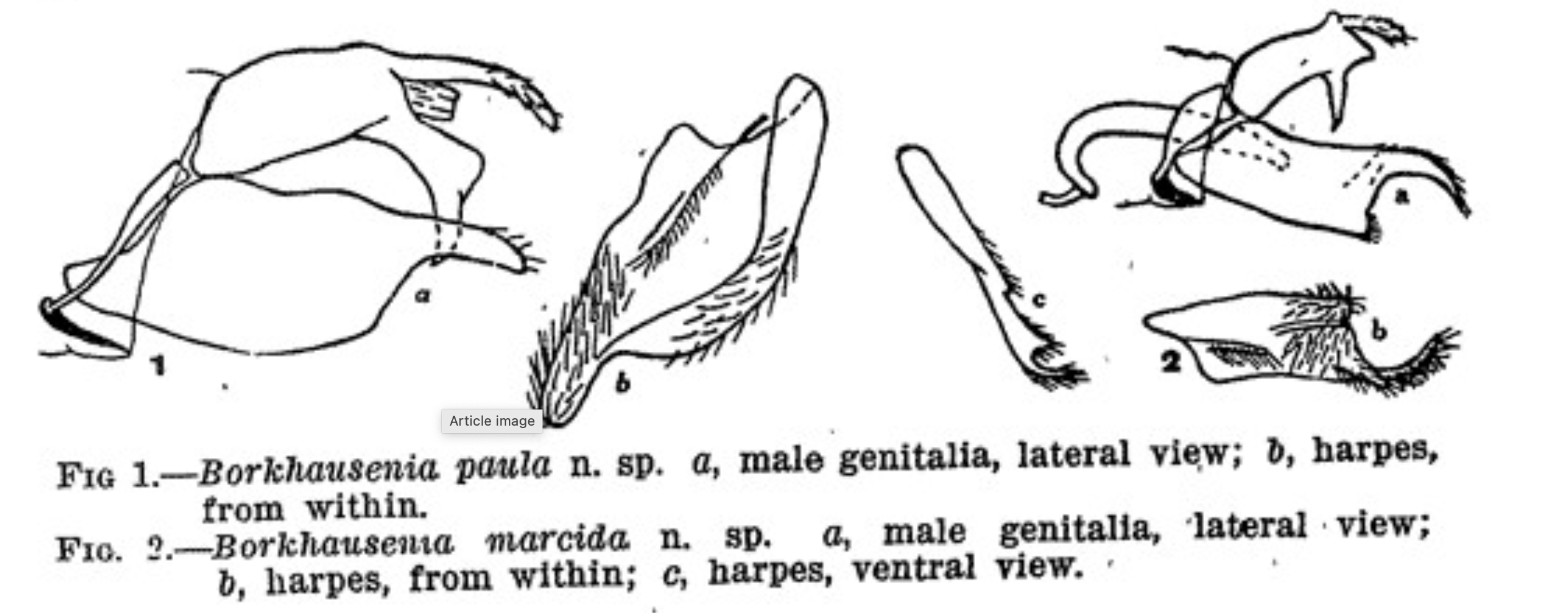
Tingena marcida - Illustration of genitalia

Philpott described this species as follows:

♂ ♀ 15–17 mm. Head, palpi and thorax brownish-grey. Antennae brown annulated with grey, ciliations in ♂ 1. Abdomen bronzy, mixed with grey basally, segmental divisions grey. Legs brown mixed with grey. Forewings moderate, costa moderately arched, apex rounded, termen very oblique; white, densely irrorated with pale bronzy-brownish; markings sometimes entirely absent but usually a spot of paler or brighter bronzy brown beneath fold at 1/3 and a similar spot in disc at 2/3, a spot on costa at 4/5 and another on tornus; dorsal spots margined posteriorly with white: fringes concolorous with wing, tips darker. Hindwings pale greyish-fuscous: fringes fuscous-grey with dark basal line.

Philpott pointed out that it is difficult to confirm the identity of this species visually as a result of its lack of markings. However the genitalia of this species is characteristic and gives more reliable evidence of the species identity. Hudson stated that this species was very similar to and might be confused with Tingena innotella. However T. marcida could be distinguished from T. innotella by the terminal appendages of the male of the species. As a result of its greyish colour T. marcida could also be confused with Izatha psychra however T. marcida has antennal pecten which is lacking in the Izatha species.

== Distribution ==
This species is endemic to New Zealand. It has been collected at its type locality of Bottle Lake as well as Governor's Bay and Mount Grey, all in Canterbury. This species has also been found in three sites of ecological significance in Christchurch as set out in the Christchurch District Plan.

== Behaviour ==
The adults of this species are on the wing in September and October.
