= Aotea Conservation Park =

Conservation park on Great Barrier Island, New Zealand

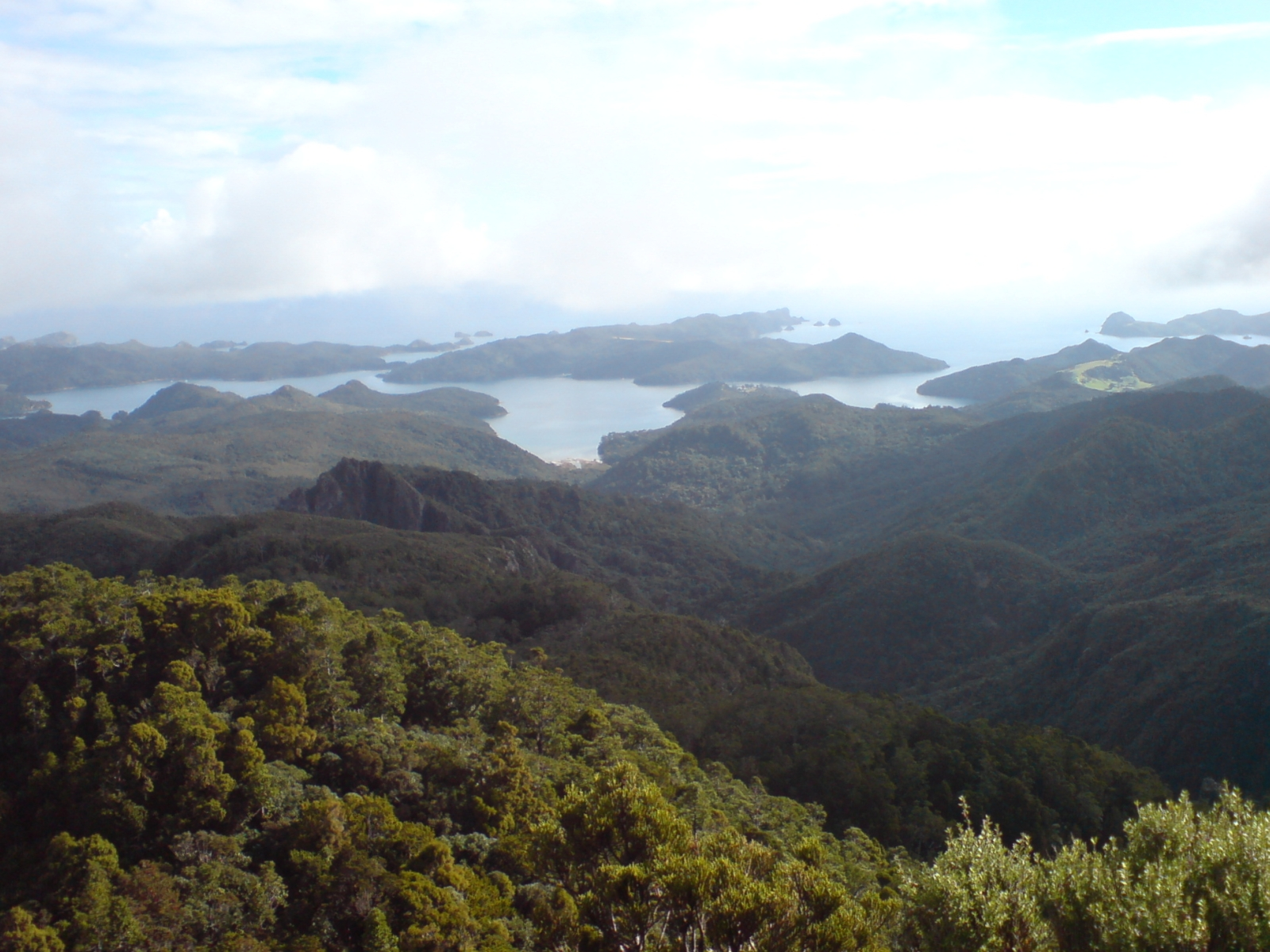
- Port Fitroy, from Mount Hobson

- Location within New Zealand
- Location: Auckland Region, New Zealand
- Nearest city: Auckland
- Coordinates: 36.192284°S 175.407852°E
- Area: 12,300 hectares (30,000 acres)
- Established: 2015
- Governing body: Department of Conservation

Aotea Conservation Park is a 12,300 hectare protected area on Great Barrier Island in New Zealand's Hauraki Gulf. It was established in 2015, and comprises 43 percent of the island.

The park includes various habitats including coastal bluffs and freshwater areas. It is home to kauri forest, pōhutukawa (Metrosideros excelsa), kānuka (Kunzea ericoides), Great Barrier tree daisy (Olearia allomii), kākā, brown teal, spotless crake, fernbird, rare frogs, paua slugs and niho taniwha (chevron skink).

It is the largest Department of Conservation park in the Auckland Region, similar in size to the Hunua Regional Park and Waitakere Ranges Regional Park. It is also the largest possum-free forest in New Zealand.

== History ==
A major storm in June and July 2014 delayed work to establish the park, and survey the area for Kauri dieback.

The park opened the following year in 2015.

The Department of Conservation closed some tracks in the park between 2018 and 2020 due to Kauri dieback. The tracks were upgraded, and reopened in January 2020.

Auckland Council and Ngāti Rehua Ngati Wai ki Aotea surveyed the park for Kauri dieback in November 2020.

In the same month, a report by the Environmental Defence Society concluded the Department of Conservation had a "woeful lack of funding" to manage and protect the park.

== See also ==
- Conservation parks of New Zealand
