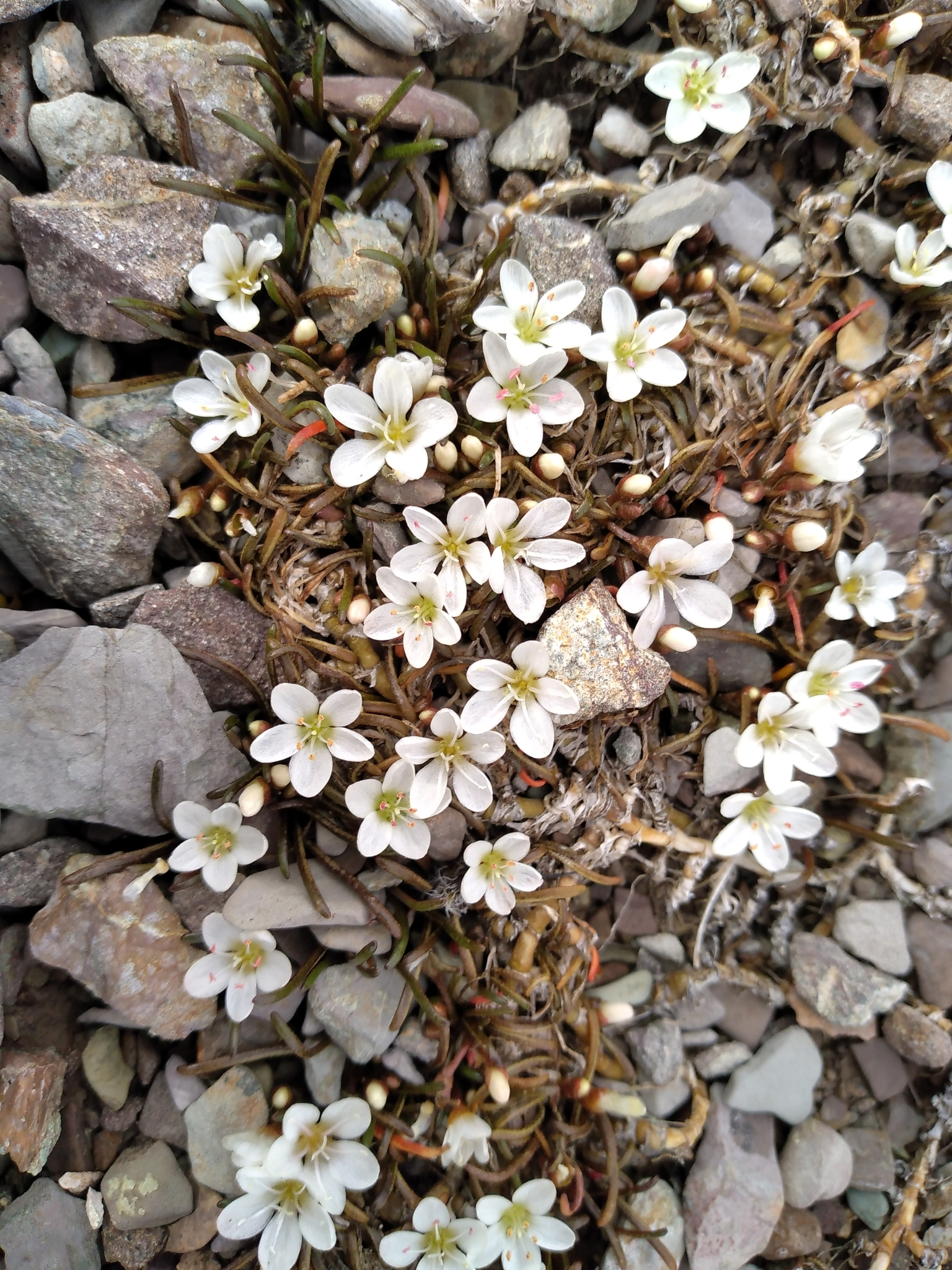
- M. calycina in Mount Richmond Forest Park

Conservation status
- Not Threatened (NZ TCS)

Scientific classification
- Kingdom: Plantae
- Clade: Tracheophytes
- Clade: Angiosperms
- Clade: Eudicots
- Order: Caryophyllales
- Family: Montiaceae
- Genus: Montia
- Species: M. calycina

Binomial name
- Montia calycina (Colenso) Pax et K. Hoffm.

= Montia calycina =

Species of flowering plant

Montia calycina is a species of flowering plant, endemic to New Zealand.

== Description ==
This herb forms mats. The low flower has orange and yellow infloresences, which are sometimes pink. It has very thin, green leaves.

== Range and habitat ==
This species is known from both the North and the South Island of New Zealand. It is an alpine specialist, known from scree fields. It can also inhabit Macrolearia colensoi-dominated scrub- and tussock-fields. It is also found in the lowlands, such as in the Manawatu area near Kapiti.

== Etymology ==
Calycina comes from the Latin word calyx, from the Greek κάλυξ, which refers to the outermost whorl of flower parts (the sepals), which covers and protects the petals as they develop. It refers to the calyx of the flower.

== Taxonomy ==
This species was previously a member of Neopaxia australasica (Hook.f.) O.Nilsson, which is now recognized only as an Australian endemic. The lectotype is from Taranaki.
