= Victoria Forest Park =

Conservation park in New Zealand

- Location within New Zealand
- Location: South Island, New Zealand
- Nearest city: Greymouth / Westport
- Coordinates: 42.190691°S 171.878210°E
- Area: 206,899 hectares (511,260 acres)
- Governing body: Department of Conservation

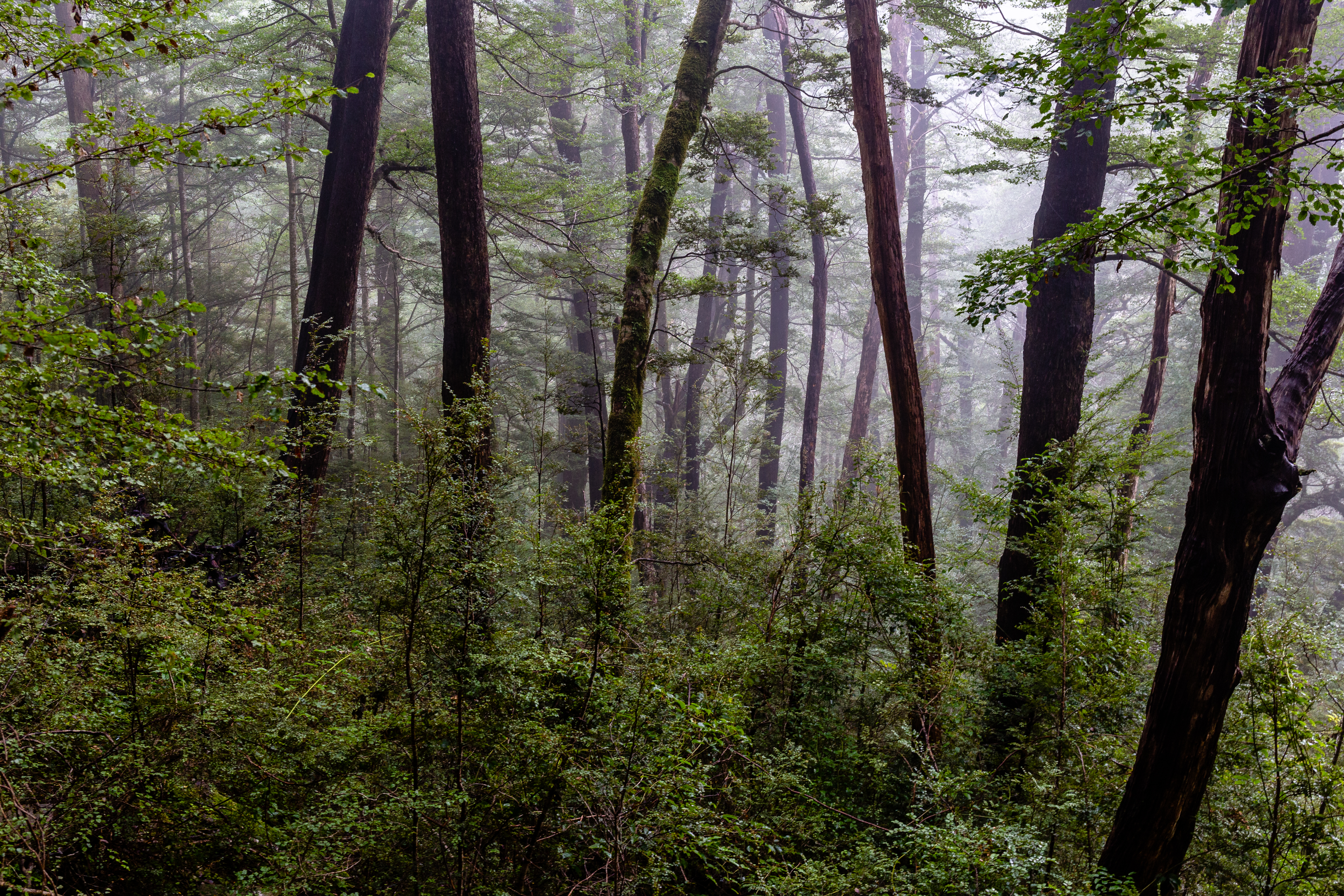
Victoria Forest Park

Victoria Forest Park, is situated on the West Coast of the South Island of New Zealand. At 2,069 square kilometres (799 sq mi) it is New Zealand's largest forest park. The park is administered by the Department of Conservation (DOC).

The park is made up of pristine beech forest and includes all five species of beech found in new Zealand - red, silver, mountain, black and hard beech. The park includes the Inangahua, Maruia and Grey Rivers, and the Victoria and Brunner Ranges. Reefton is the main town in the area and is located on the South Western edge of the park. Reefton was once a coal and gold mining town, and old mining equipment can still be found in the Park.

== Establishment of Victoria Forest Park ==
During the 1970s, fourteen forests parks were set up as a result of pressure from environmentalists. It wasn’t until 1981 that Victoria Forest Park was afforded the same protection.

== Ecology ==
Victoria Forest Park is predominantly made up of beech forests which is also the largest remaining indigenous forest type in New Zealand as beech forests are normally located on mountain landscapes not suitable for farming and were therefore not cleared. Dependent on beech forest survival are three types of mistletoe, which include crimson mistletoe (Peraxilla colensoi), pirirangi or red mistletoe (Peraxilla tetrapetala) and the Alepis flavida. All three species of mistletoe are at risk of extinction as a result of possum browse. The beech forests also support the scale insect, which is a vital for the food supply of native bird and insect species. The scale insect lives in the bark of beech trees drawing in sap, which it then excretes as honeydew and is an important energy source for tui, bellbirds and kaka. The Victoria Forest Park provides essential habitat for a large array of fauna, just a fraction of which are described below.

=== Fauna ===
==== Bellbird (Anthonis melanura) ====
Bellbirds inhabit native forest, including beech forest, and were previously common throughout New Zealand but significantly declined in number at about the same time ship rats and stoats arrived. These predators are still keeping bellbird numbers low today. The bellbirds play an important role in pollination of many native New Zealand plant species especially the New Zealand mistletoes, fuchsia and kowhai

==== Kaka (Nestor meridionalis) ====
The kaka is a forest parrot that was once widespread throughout New Zealand but in the last 100 years they have become far less abundant. This is a result of the mammalian predator numbers which increase significantly in years when beech trees seed as this also happens to be the only time when the kaka attempts to breed. Additionally, the kaka has to compete with wasps and possums for the honeydew produced by the native scale insects within beech forests.

==== Blue duck/whio (Hymenolaimus malacorhynchos) ====
The blue duck is one of only six species of waterfowl that permanently inhabits rivers. It inhabits rivers within Victoria Forest Park as well as other parts of New Zealand, feeding primarily on aquatic invertebrates. Blue duck numbers have declined over the last 100 years as a result of predation by introduced mammals and habitat destruction.

==== Tomtit (Petroica macrocephala) ====
The South Island tomtit is a common small native forest bird of South Island New Zealand inhabiting various types of forests and shrub lands. Males are mainly black and white while females are mainly brown and white. The main threat to the tomtit is introduced mammals as they make easy prey because they nest in cavities and so are not able to escape from predators

==== Great spotted kiwi (Apteryx haastii) ====
The great spotted kiwi is not as widely distributed throughout New Zealand as it once was. There are thought to be approximately 22,000 distributed throughout South Island however the number remaining within the Victoria Forest Park is thought to be very low. It is estimated that great spotted kiwi populations has reduced by about 30% since European settlement. It is thought that the introduction of stoats and possums has caused the great spotted kiwi to migrate to higher altitudes, possibly because these environments are less favourable to introduced predators. Video surveillance shows stoats and possums entering kiwi nests, but incubating adults are normally able to repel them, however the predators do manage to eat some eggs and possibly damage others.

==== Rock wren (Xenicus gilviventris) ====
Small numbers of rock wren have been recorded in Victoria Forest Park. The rock wren is listed as a "Nationally Vulnerable" in the New Zealand Threat Classification, and is a small ground-feeding subpasserine that spends its life above the tree line on the South Island of New Zealand. Because of the harsh environment the rock wren inhabits, very little scientific study has been carried out. Mice and stoats are identified as predators of rock wren eggs and young as a result of the birds poor flight ability and ground-feeding habit.

==== Powelliphanta snails ====
There are at least 21 species and 51 sub-species of Powelliphanta snail, 40 of which are threatened, and are found only in New Zealand. They are the largest snails in the world, growing up to 90 mm across. They are carnivorous and prey upon earthworms.

==== Western weka (Gallirallus australia) ====
The western weka is the most common of the weka sub-species however it is still classed as vulnerable. It is a large flightless bird and had been introduced to offshore islands, which was unsuccessful because of predatory impacts on other native fauna

==== Kea (Nestor notabilis) ====
The kea is a vulnerable bird species found all along the west coast of the New Zealand South Island and is the world’s only alpine parrot. Because they nest on the ground, predators attack a large proportion of nests during breeding

==== Yellow-crowned parakeet (Cyanoramphus auriceps) ====
The yellow-crowned parakeet is a rare species of parakeet found on the North and South Islands of New Zealand, including beech forests. They were once a common bird however, during the 1800s large numbers would feed on farmers grain and fruit crops and as a result, they were seen as a pest and shot by farmers

=== Flora ===
==== Crimson mistletoe (Peraxilla colensoi) and red mistletoe (Peraxilla tetrapetala) ====
Found all over New Zealand are various species of mistletoe. Species of mistletoe found within the Victoria Forest Park include the crimson mistletoe and the red mistletoe, both of which are threatened. Studies have demonstrated a decline in mistletoe distribution throughout New Zealand, which is likely to be attributed to the brush tail possum, loss of pollinating and dispersing birds and over collecting. Some species of mistletoe are insect pollinated however most rely on birds for dispersal. Possums also browse the foliage of mistletoes, sometimes so significantly that plants are killed.

== Environmental threats ==
=== Introduced species ===
Prior to human arrival in New Zealand the only mammals present were three species of bats. However, since human arrival, about 900 years ago, at least 31 species of mammal have established as wild or feral populations in New Zealand. The kiore (Rattus exulans) first arrived with the early Polynesians, and another three species arrived during European settlement between 1770 and 1890. Stoat (Mustela ermine), weasel (M. nivalis) , and ferret (M. furo) were released in the 1880s in an attempt to control rabbits (Orycto-lagus cuniculus). Domestic cats (Felis catus) also arrived in New Zealand as a result of European settlement. The introduction of these species has caused native birds species in New Zealand to dramatically decline.

Victoria Forest Park is predominantly made up of beech forest, which are important conservation reserves for endemic birds, and in the summers following heavy seeding of the beech trees, which occurs every 4–6 years, insect, mouse (Mus musculus), and stoat numbers increase rapidly. When the beech forests experience a high seed year, it results in a population pulse of the house mice which then results in the population pulse of the stoat (King and Powell 2011). When there is an abundance of food available for the stoat, they are able to produce larger litters and with the stoat being the most common mammalian carnivore in South Island beech forests, conservation managers prepare for heavy seedfall as a period of increased conservation hazard in beach forests. In beech forests, mohua, kaka, robins, bellbirds and blue ducks are all at risk of being predated on by stoats post seed fall irruptions

Significantly increasing the risk to New Zealand birds is the fact that the majority are hole nesting birds and don’t possess the predator avoidance mechanisms that other introduced species possess and so they are more vulnerable for the following reasons:

- They nest in holes with only one entrance meaning the incubating adult is not able to escape when a predator enters.
- Predation results in a biased sex ratio as only the females incubate.
- Native birds incubation period is longer than most introduced bird species
- Native bird chicks are more noisy on the nest, attracting the attention of predators

==== Wasps (Vespula spp.) ====
The introduction to New Zealand of the German wasp (Vespula germanica) and the common wasp (Vespula vulgaris) has severely impacted on native New Zealand species. Beech forests of New Zealand, like those of Victoria Forest Park, are infested with scale insects that excrete a sugary secretion. Wasps compete with the native nectar feeding birds and insects for this sugary secretion, thereby reducing the amount of honeydew that would otherwise be available. Within the beech forests of New Zealand, the biomass of wasps is estimated to be greater than the combined biomass of birds, rodents and stoats and it is estimated that they reduce the honeydew resource by >90% as well as having a major predation impact on native invertebrates.

==== Possums (Trichosurus vulpecula) ====
Common brushtail possums significantly impact the native species of the Victoria Forest Park beech forests by competing for nectar, fruit and seed resources. They also remove native birds from their nest sites and eat native bird eggs. However, the population of possums in South Island beech forests is much lower in density compared to that of other types of native forest in New Zealand. Even though they may be at lesser density in beech forests, possums have been found to severely damage mistletoe and have the potential to threaten these plants with local extinction.

=== Mining ===
The town of Reefton, located on the western edge of Victoria Forest Park, was founded as a gold and coal mining town in the 1880s. As such, mining relics can still be found throughout the park. Some mining is still being carried out within the Victoria Forest Park. In 1993, GRD Macraes was granted permission for a mine footprint of 107ha and were authorised a pit, tailings dam and a waste rock stack. Since then, the mine footprint has been extended to170ha. GRD Macraes have made numerous other variation applications to increase the scale of the footprint and production which have been refused. In April 2014 the park gained public attention with the Government allowing new oil and gas exploration permits in the park.

== Extinctions ==
Many native animals have suffered range contractions or extinction as a result of the impacts from introduced mammals. Since European settlement and the introduction of mammalian species, native bird species have been severely impacted because of their natural habits making them significantly more vulnerable than other species that have evolved with the same predators. As a result, of these mammalian predators, approximately 49% of New Zealand’s non-marine endemic birds are extinct. Even through Victoria Forest Park has remained relatively untouched, the native fauna within the park are not excluded from these statistics, and there are a number of species that have gone extinct or are no longer present in the Victoria Park Region. Just a few of these species include:

- Yellowhead (mōhua) (Mohoua ochrocephala) were once widespread throughout the South Island. The mohua’s distribution is now restricted to the south of South Island and a few small isolated patches in the north of South Island. It no longer inhabits Victoria Forest Park.
- The red-crowned parakeet (Cyanoramphus novaezelandiae) was a common bird throughout the North and South Island but is now virtually extinct on the main islands. It is however common on a number of offshore islands.
- The South Island kōkako had inhabited the greatest part of South Island up until around the 1880s when its number declined rapidly as a result of the introduction of rats and stoats. It is now thought to be extinct however it is possible that they may survive in low numbers in remote parts of South Island as it was classed as data deficient by the Department of Conservation in 2013 following the acceptance of a sighting near Reefton in 2007.

== Management ==
=== Pest Management ===
The restoration of New Zealand’s mainland ecological communities has been extremely challenging. The use of aerial and bait station poisoning for rats and possums and kill-trapping of mustelids has been attempted in many mainland forests. This has resulted in increased breeding success of native bird species. Poisoning of stoats rather than trapping has the potential to greatly reduce the cost of controlling stoats as fewer visits to the area are required and because stoats are difficult to trap and it has been identified that secondary poisoning of stoats in South Island beech forest could be an effective means of control. In a study by Alterio (2000) on the use of 1080 and brodifacoum for controlling rodents such as rats and mice, secondary poisoning of stoats and cats was found to be significant and so this could be an especially useful way of restoring New Zealand mainland ecological communities. However, it is necessary that poisoning is carried out in a way that it will not have any impacts on non target native species.

=== Hunting ===
No mammal species that has been introduced to New Zealand is afforded any type of protection. Therefore, there are few restrictions on recreational hunting of introduced mammals apart from getting permission of the landowner to gain access to the land. Pest managers see recreational hunting as a reasonably useful control method but recreational hunting tends not to maintain low enough densities of their target species to protect the more vulnerable species.

== See also ==
- Forest Parks of New Zealand
- National parks of New Zealand
- Protected areas of New Zealand
- Conservation in New Zealand
- Tramping in New Zealand
