= North-west Nelson Forest Park =

Forest park in New Zealand

Coordinates: 40.781°S 172.433°E

North-west Nelson Forest Park, also spelled Northwest Nelson Forest Park and North West Nelson Forest Park, is a forest park that was initially very large and managed by the New Zealand Forest Service until the Department of Conservation was formed in 1987. It existed in its initial form from 1970 until 1996, when most of it became Kahurangi National Park. Since then, the remainder of the forest park has been made up of many disparate and unconnected areas around the perimeter of the national park.

== History ==
Beginning in 1920, forest parks were gazetted north of the Buller River. In the end, there were thirteen separate forest parks. The northernmost eight of those parks were gazetted as the North-west Nelson Forest Park in 1970. The North-west Nelson Forest Park covered approximately 360,000 ha (890,000 acres) of land. The forest park was managed by the New Zealand Forest Service. In 1970, many of the tracks in the park were overgrown. The Forest Service started on a programme of work to promote recreation in the park, including cutting new tracks and building huts. In 1987, the Forest Service was amalgamated with other organisations and became the Department of Conservation, which took over the management of the state forests.

From the 1970s, mining companies explored within the forest park and that led to public requests to give the area the higher protection of a national park. The proposal that created most concern was Coronado Global Resources' application to bulldoze a track to the Mount Arthur Tablelands. Much of the forest park plus parts of Mt Owen and Matiri State Forests became Kahurangi National Park in 1996.

Around 60 land parcels of the North-west Nelson Forest Park were excluded from Kahurangi National Park for a variety of reasons. These include hydro stations, grazing leases, sphagnum moss gathering areas, and mining operations or interests. As a result, remaining areas of North-west Nelson Forest Park are highly fragmented. The largest of those excluded parcels is the Taitapu Block, some 28,000 ha (69,000 acres) surrounding Lake Otuhie south of Mangarakau, as it was subject to a Waitangi claim.
