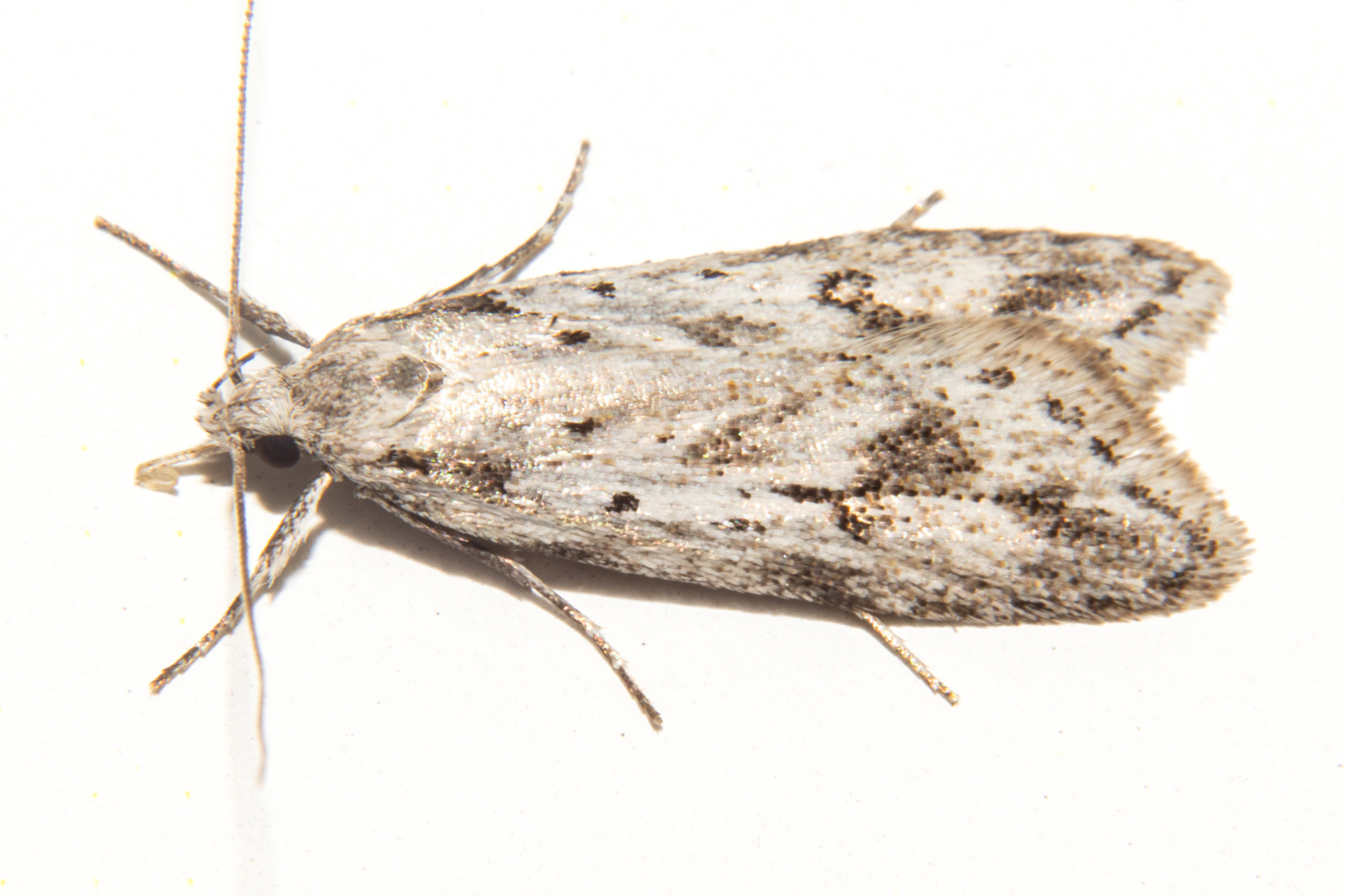

Conservation status
- Nationally Endangered (NZ TCS)

Scientific classification
- Kingdom: Animalia
- Phylum: Arthropoda
- Clade: Pancrustacea
- Class: Insecta
- Order: Lepidoptera
- Family: Oecophoridae
- Genus: Izatha
- Species: I. psychra

Binomial name
- Izatha psychra (Meyrick, 1883)

Synonyms
- Aochleta psychra Meyrick, 1883

= Izatha psychra =

Species of moth

Izatha psychra is a species of moth of the family Oecophoridae. It is endemic to New Zealand. It is classified as Nationally Endangered by the Department of Conservation. In 2020 it was feared that this moth was extinct as a result of a fire at the Pukaki Scientific Reserve, the last known locality of this species. However a 2021 survey found I. psychra present in the small portion of the reserve that was not damaged by the fire. This species is also present at the Oteake Conservation Park.

== Taxonomy ==
This species was first described by Edward Meyrick and named Aochleta psychra in 1883 using a male specimen collected by John Enys at Porters Pass. Meyrick gave a fuller description of this species in 1884. This type specimen is held at the Natural History Museum, London. George Vernon Hudson repeated Meyrick's description in his 1928 publication The Butterflies and Moths of New Zealand. In 1988 John S. Dugdale assigned Aochleta psychra to the genus Izatha. As at 2010 neither the larva nor the female of this species are known or have been described.

== Description ==
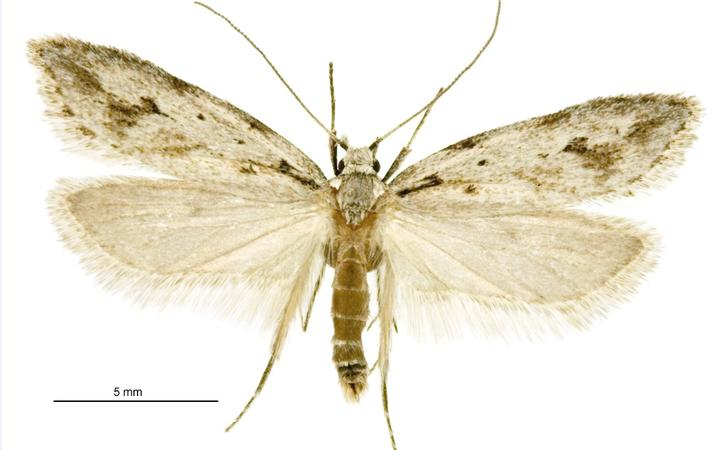
I. psychra male

Meyrick described the species as follows:

Male. — 21 mm. Head and thorax grey-whitish, sprinkled with fuscous-grey. Palpi grey-whitish, mixed with fuscous, basal half of second joint dark fuscous externally, terminal joint with a slender dark fuscous ring above middle. Antennae grey. Abdomen grey-whitish. Legs dark-fuscous, posterior tibiae with grey-whitish hairs, all tarsi with obscure whitish rings at apex of joints. Forewings elongate, slightly dilated, costa gently arched, apex obtuse, hindmargin oblique, nearly straight; whitish, irregularly irrorated with grey and fuscous scales; these tend to form suffused markings, a spot on middle of inner margin, another above anal angle, a narrow suffusion along posterior half of costa, and an apical patch; a small cloudy darker spot towards hindmargin in middle; a minute black dot in disc at 1/3, another slightly above it in middle, and a very small blackish ocellus in disc at 2/3 : cilia whitish, with two cloudy grey lines. Hindwings whitish; cilia whitish, with two faint grey lines.

It is possible to confuse this species with some of the greyish coloured species within the genus Tingena. However I. psychra can be distinguished as it lacks the antennal pecten of the Tigena species.

== Distribution ==
This species is endemic to New Zealand, and has only been found in the southern half of the South Island. I. psychra is only known from three localities, its type locality of Porters Pass where it has not been seen since the 19th century, and the small Pukaki Scientific Reserve near Lake Pukaki in the Mackenzie Basin. In 2022 and in 2023 this species was also observed at the Oteake Conservation Park.

== Ecology and habitat ==
Male adults are on the wing from January to February. In the one remain site where this species is known to exist, the Pukaki Scientific Reserve, the habitat is shrubland. The Pukaki Scientific Reserve was significantly damaged by fire in August 2020 and for a time fears were held that this may have resulted in the extinction of the species. However a survey completed in 2021 caught two adult males of this species, indicating this species' continued existence at that reserve. The sites where this species is found in the Oteake Conservation Park are near a stream and as such are humid and are populated with native shrubs and trees including Coprosma and Gaultheria species, Corokia cotonester, Olearia bullata and Podocarpus totara.

== Host species ==
The host species of this moth is currently unknown. However larvae are likely to feed on dead wood or lichens.

== Conservation status ==
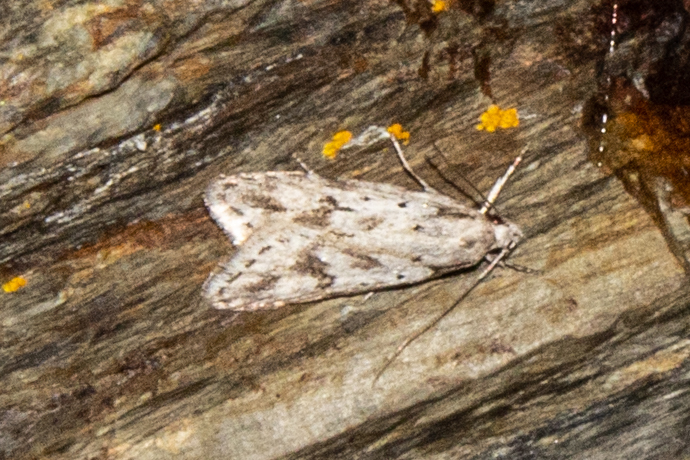
Observation of live I. psychra.

Despite being given a level of protection by being classified as a Scientific Reserve, the lone shrubland site inhabited by I. psychra is vulnerable to wilding pine invasion and fire. As a result, this species has been classified under the New Zealand Threat Classification system as being Nationally Endangered. As at May 2021 conservation work is being undertaken to help protect the habitat of this moth after the devastating August 2020 fire at the reserve. The discovery of this species at the Oteake Conservation Park may indicate this species is less threatened than originally thought.
