= Catlins Conservation Park =

Protected area in New Zealand

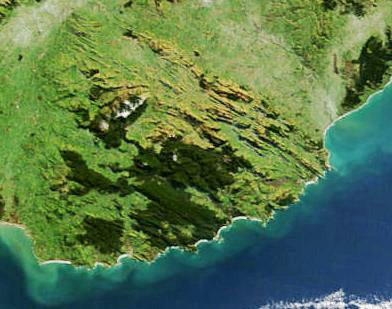
- Satellite image of The Catlins

- Location within New Zealand
- Location: Otago Region, New Zealand
- Nearest city: Dunedin
- Coordinates: 46°32′00″S 169°16′20″E
- Area: 53,041 hectares (131,070 acres)
- Established: 1975
- Governing body: Department of Conservation

Catlins Conservation Park is a protected area in the Otago region of New Zealand, covering 53,041 hectares in The Catlins, within the Clutha District.

The park includes the McLean Falls, and a range of tramping tracks.

== History ==
The park was established in 1975.

It was included in the 1080 pest control programme in 2014.

The body of missing Dunedin man Stephen Lowe was found in the park in September 2017 by a librarian and her dog.

In January 2019, local MP Sarah Dowie proposed converting the park into a national park.

== See also ==
- Conservation parks of New Zealand
