= Kaimai Mamaku Conservation Park =

Conservation park in New Zealand

- Location within New Zealand
- Location: North Island, New Zealand
- Nearest town: Te Aroha
- Coordinates: 37.721°S 175.888°E
- Area: 37,000 hectares (91,000 acres)
- Established: 1975
- Governing body: Department of Conservation

The Kaimai Mamaku Conservation Park is a protected area in the North Island of New Zealand. It was formed in 1975 as the Kaimai-Mamaku Forest Park, defined as a Conservation Park in 1987, and renamed in 2009. The park forms a barrier between the Waikato and Bay of Plenty regions, and runs from the Karangahake Gorge in the north, almost to Rotorua in the south. The park covers an area of around 37,000 hectares.

The Department of Conservation administers the land.

== See also ==
- Kaimai Range
- Conservation parks of New Zealand
