= Raukūmara Conservation Park =

Protected area in New Zealand

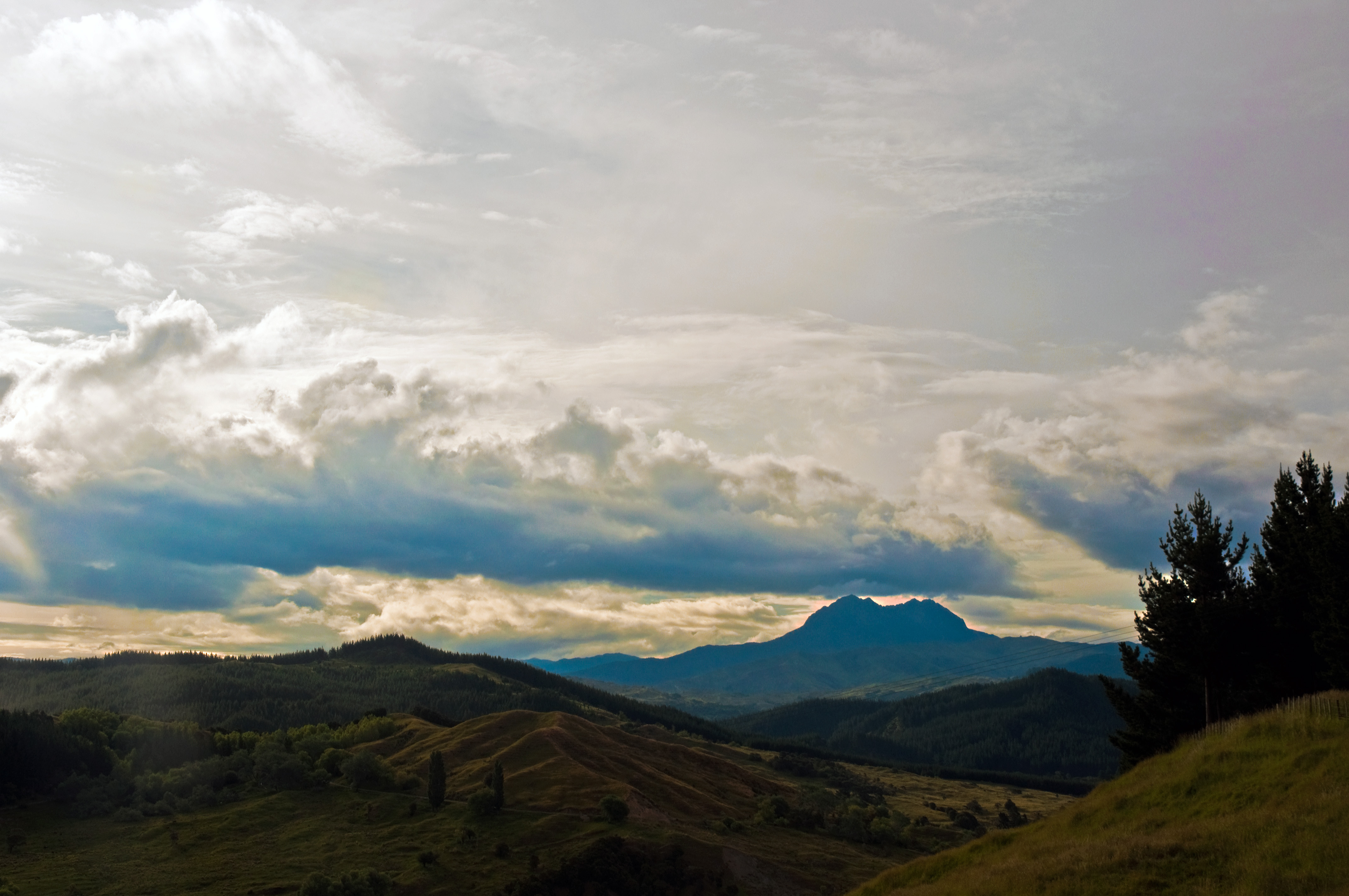
- Mount Hikurangi

- Location within New Zealand
- Location: New Zealand
- Coordinates: 37.99°S 177.69°E
- Area: 111,021 hectares (274,340 acres)
- Established: 1979
- Governing body: Department of Conservation

Raukūmara Conservation Park is a protected area in the Gisborne District of New Zealand's North Island. The park is managed by the New Zealand Department of Conservation.

== Geography ==
The park covers 111,021 hectares (274,340 acres) of the Raukūmara Range and surrounding area, including Mount Hikurangi and the Mōtū River.

== History ==
The park was established in 1979.
