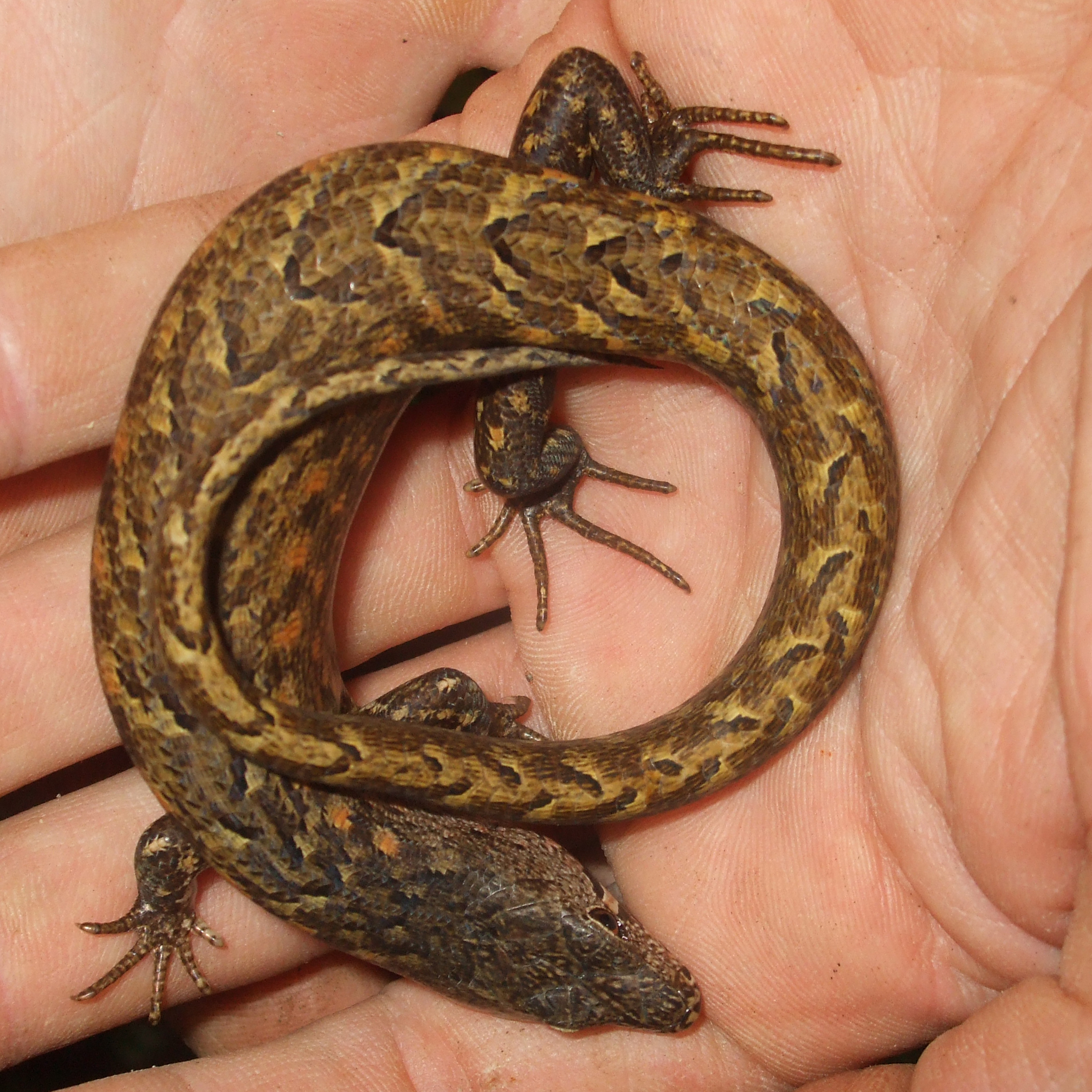

Conservation status
- Endangered (IUCN 3.1)

Scientific classification
- Kingdom: Animalia
- Phylum: Chordata
- Class: Reptilia
- Order: Squamata
- Family: Scincidae
- Genus: Oligosoma
- Species: O. homalonotum

Binomial name
- Oligosoma homalonotum (Boulenger, 1906)
- Distribution of the chevron skink on a map of the North Island Known native range

Synonyms
- Leiolopisma gracilicorpus Hardy, 1977; Lygosoma homalonotum Boulenger, 1906; Oligosoma gracilicorpus (Hardy, 1977)

= Chevron skink =

Species of lizard

The chevron skink (Oligosoma homalonotum; Māori: niho taniwha) is a large species of skink that is endemic to New Zealand. Previously found across Northland and the northern Auckland Region, it is now found only on the Great Barrier and Little Barrier islands in the Hauraki Gulf. A cryptic forest dweller, it can hide underwater. The chevron skink is the longest species of skink in New Zealand, reaching lengths of up to 340 mm (13 in). It is under threat from introduced rats.

== Taxonomy ==
The chevron skink was first described in 1906 as Lygosoma homalonotum by George Albert Boulenger based on a single specimen from Great Barrier Island. As the museum type specimen was mislabelled as coming from Flat Island in the Mokohinau group, the species was not located again until 70 years later, when Graham S. Hardy found 13 specimens on Great Barrier Island. The specific epithet, "homalonotum", means "smoothed backed".

In 1955, Charles McCann recombined the species as Leiolopisma homalonotum. This was the accepted scientific name until 1995, when Geoff Patterson and Charles Daugherty reinstated the genus Oligosoma, placing the chevron skink within the genus.

In 2009, Oligosoma gracilicorpus, also known as the narrow-bodied skink or narrow skink, was synonymised with Oligosoma homalonotum. The authors considered O. gracilicorpus to be an extinct mainland New Zealand population of Oligosoma homalonotum.

== Description ==
Boulenger's original text (the type description) reads as follows:

Body subquadrangular, back quite flat. The distance between the end of the snout and the fore limb is contained once and two thirds in the distance between axilla and groin. Snout rather elongate, obtusely pointed. Lower eyelid with an undivided transparent disk. Nostril pierced in a single nasal; no supranasal; frontonasal broader than long, broadJy in contact with the rostral, narrowly with the frontal; latter shield a little shorter than frontoparietals and interparietal together, in contact with the two anterior supraoculars; four supraoculars, second largest; eight supracillaries; frontoparietals and interparietal distinct, subequal in size; parietals in contact behind the interparietal, bordered by a pair of nuchals and a pair of temporals; fourth, fifth, and sixth upper labials below the eye. Ear-opening oval, a little larger than the transparent palpebral disk. 30 scales round the body, dorsals, especially the two median rows, largest and faintly striated. Praeanal scales slightly enlarged. The adpressed limbs nearly meet. Digits moderately long, subcylindrical; subdigital lamella smooth, 20 under the fourth toe. Brown above, on the body the scales with darker strie, head darker, tail yellowish; a series of Ʌ-shaped dark brown spots along the middle of the back and tail; a series of large yellowish spots on each side, most distinct on the neck and above the fore limbs; limbs with yellowish spots; two black vertical bars below the eye, with a yellowish bar between them; lower parts yellowish, dotted with brown, the dots crowded on the gular region, forming striolations; chin spotted with black.

O. homalonotum is light reddish brown in colour, becoming grey on the neck and head, with distinctive black markings under the chin. The common name of the species has its origins in the distinctive chevrons along its back and tail; these arrow-shaped markings all point towards the head of the animal. The species has a snout–vent length of up to 146 mm (5.7 in). With a total body length of up to 340 mm (13 in), the chevron skink is the longest known species of skink in New Zealand.

Juveniles of the species may be confused with Oligosoma ornatum, however the chevron skink can be identified due to the "teardrop" markings on the species' upper and lower jaws, alongside the longer snout, elongated torso, and longer tail.

== Distribution and habitat ==
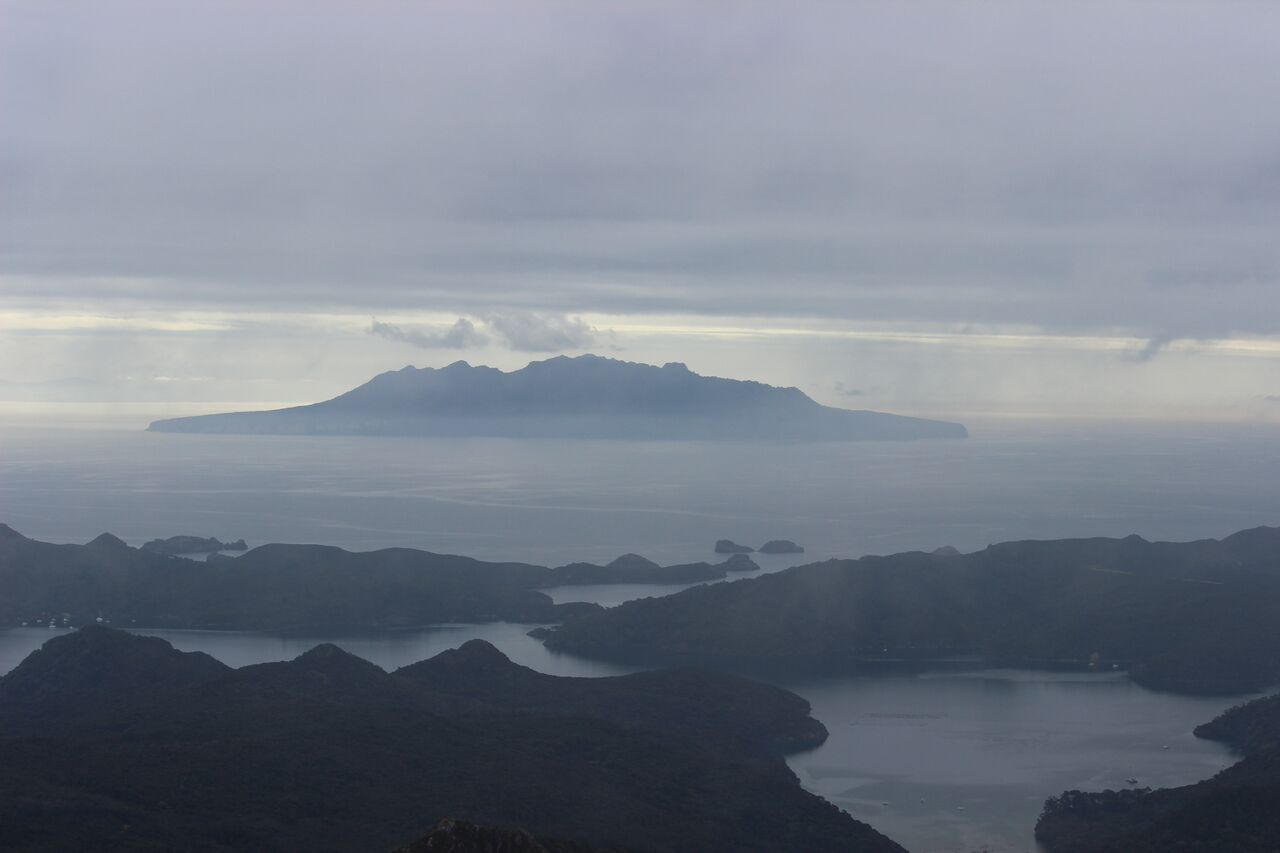
Chevron skinks live in high humidity areas of Great Barrier Island and Little Barrier Island

The species is endemic to Great Barrier Island and Little Barrier Island in the Auckland Region. Chevron skinks were once found on the northern North Island: subfossil remains of large skinks have been recovered from Tokerau Beach and Waipu, and large lizards were reported from the Hokianga in the early 20th century. The species' historic range included mainland Northland Region and northern Auckland Region. Like many New Zealand lizards, introduced predators have confined them to offshore islands as "pseudoendemics".

The species lives in areas of dense native forest, often found around streams and humid environments. Chevron skinks may occasionally be found in clay banks, occupying kingfisher and spider holes.

== Ecology ==
Although active during the day, the chevron skink is very secretive and well camouflaged against a background of fern fronds or leaf litter. It is prone to dehydration, so prefers to live on forested stream margins. It is able to retreat underwater and hold its breath to avoid predators, and will climb vegetation and hide to escape flash floods. Juveniles seem to prefer the banks of rocky streams, living in debris dams and rock crevices, and adults are occasionally found in trees. Chevron skinks eat invertebrates such as spiders, insect larvae, and small snails. Litters of up to eight young are produced in late summer–early autumn.

The species reaches sexual maturity between 3 and 4 years of age, and can live up to 20 years in the wild.

== Conservation status ==
Up to the 1990s, there had only been 100 or so sightings of this species, so a research programme led by the Department of Conservation (DOC) began to assess its conservation status. In 2012, DOC classified the chevron skink as Nationally Vulnerable under the New Zealand Threat Classification System.

The largest population is on Great Barrier Island, in at least 20 catchments, where they coexist with pigs, feral cats, mice, and two species of rats. They are extremely secretive, with catch frequencies of approximately one found every 400 trap-days. Conservation efforts have focused on education, pig control, and intensive predator control in certain areas.

Only two chevron skinks have been seen on Hauturu (Little Barrier), one after over 20,000 trap days of effort. Cats have already been removed from 3,083 hectares (7,620 acres) Little Barrier Island, and DOC have proposed removing kiore (Rattus exulans).

In 1997, Auckland Zoo became the first zoo in the world to care for chevron skinks, after two injured skinks were brought to the zoo from Great Barrier Island. In 2020, six chevron skinks were born at the zoo.

== Gallery ==
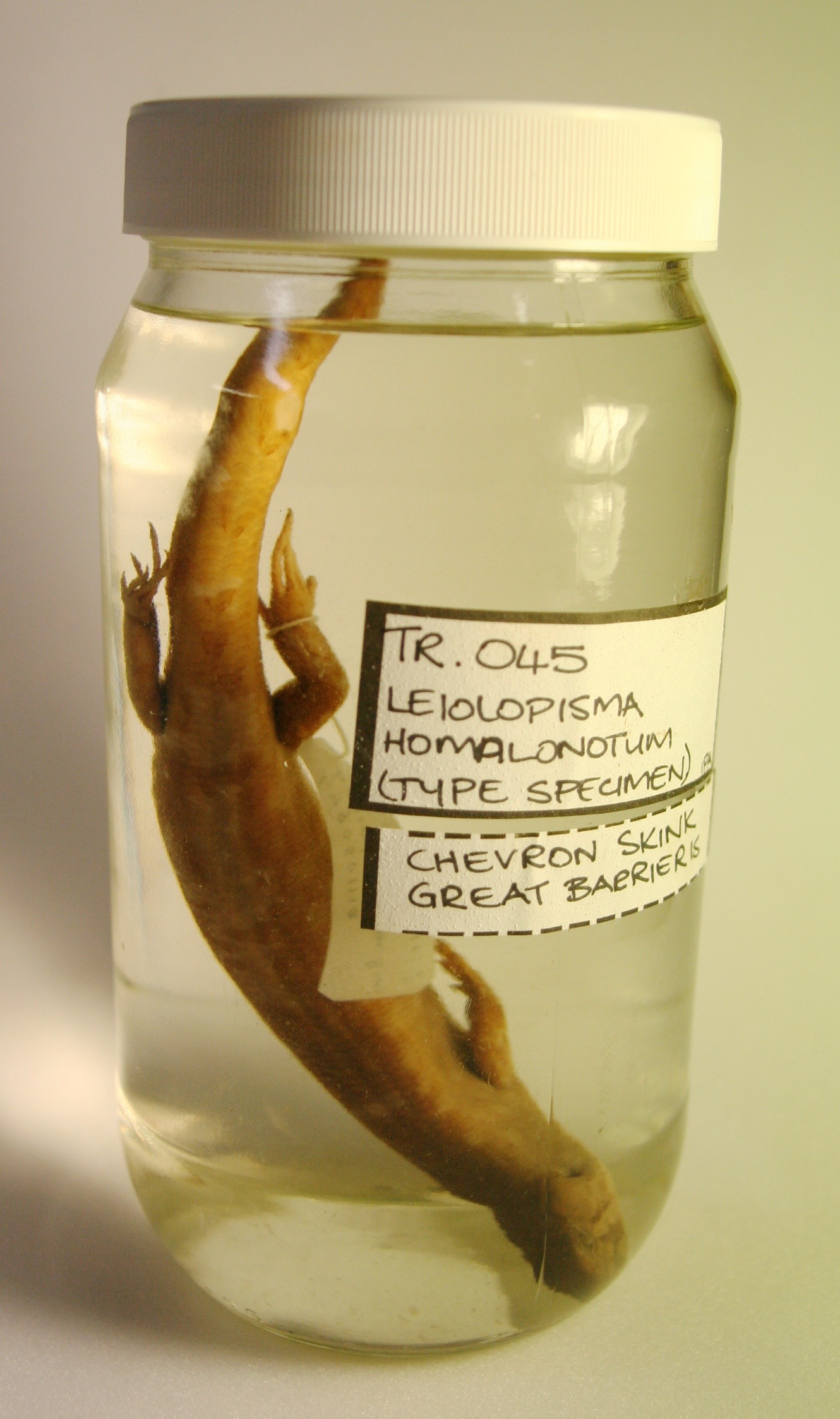
The holotype of the chevron skink in the Whanganui Regional Museum, from the Henry Suter collection

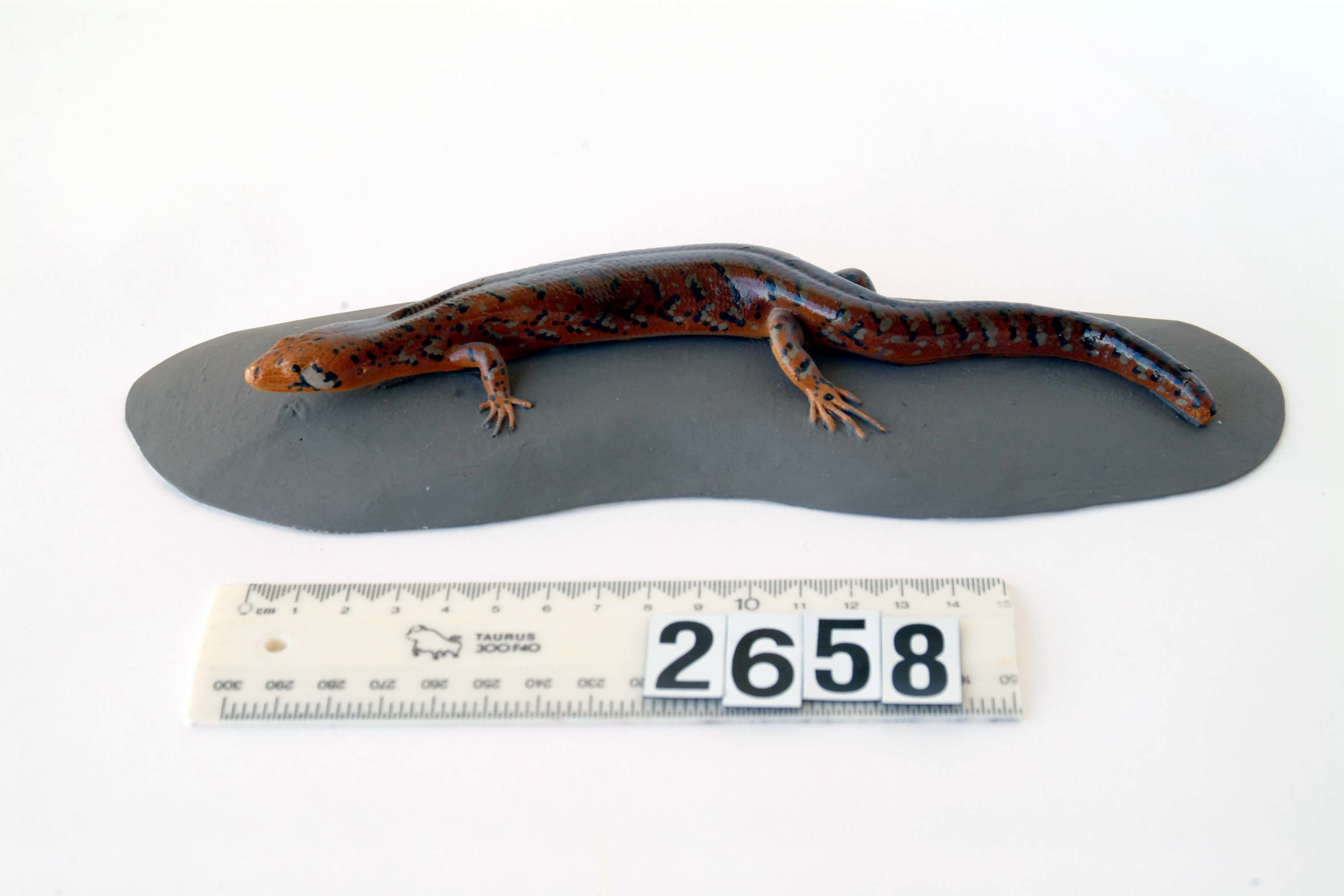
Taxidermy specimen from the collections of Auckland War Memorial Museum

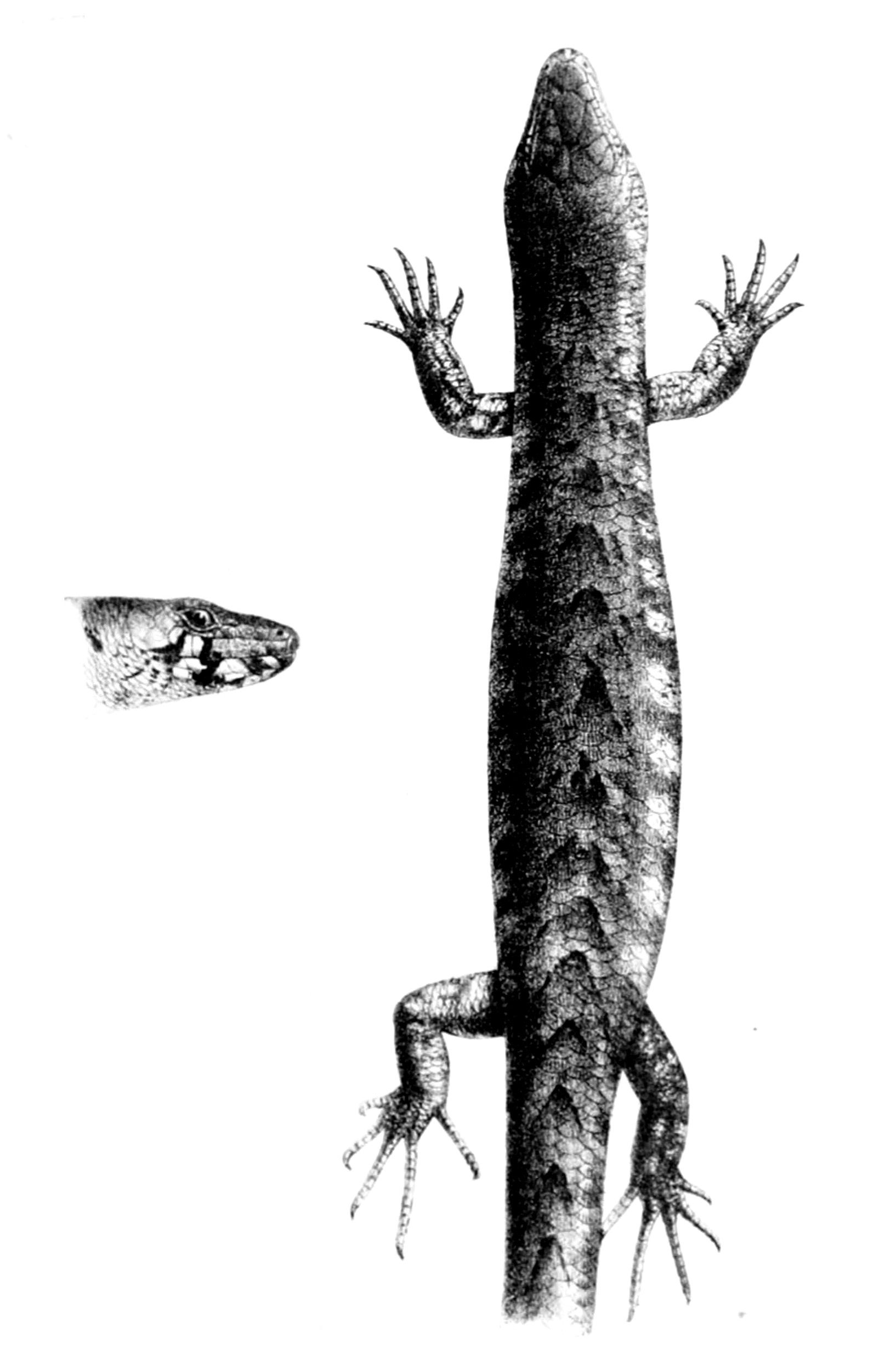
1906 illustration from George Albert Boulenger's original type description

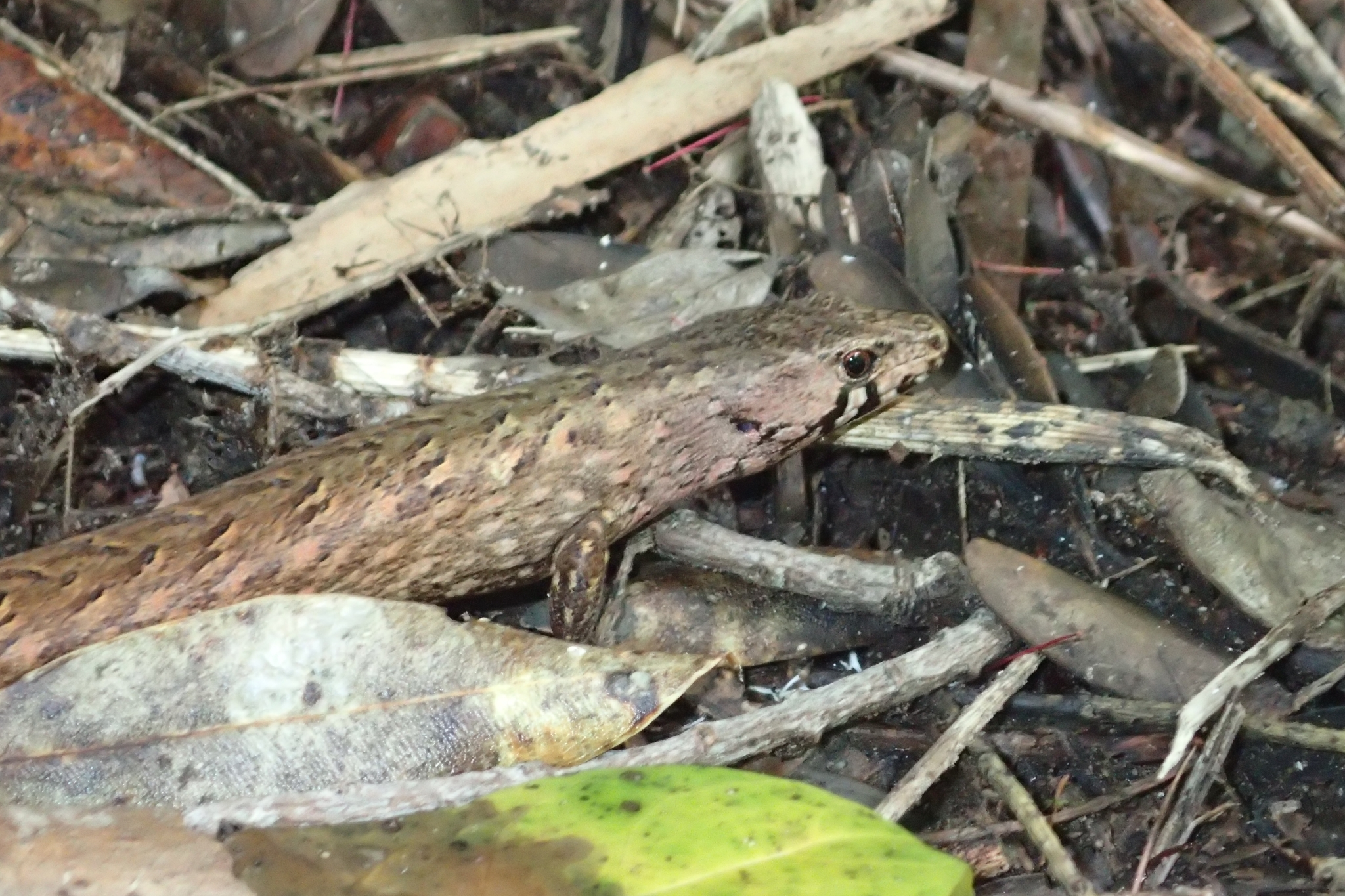
Chevron skink seen on Little Barrier Island

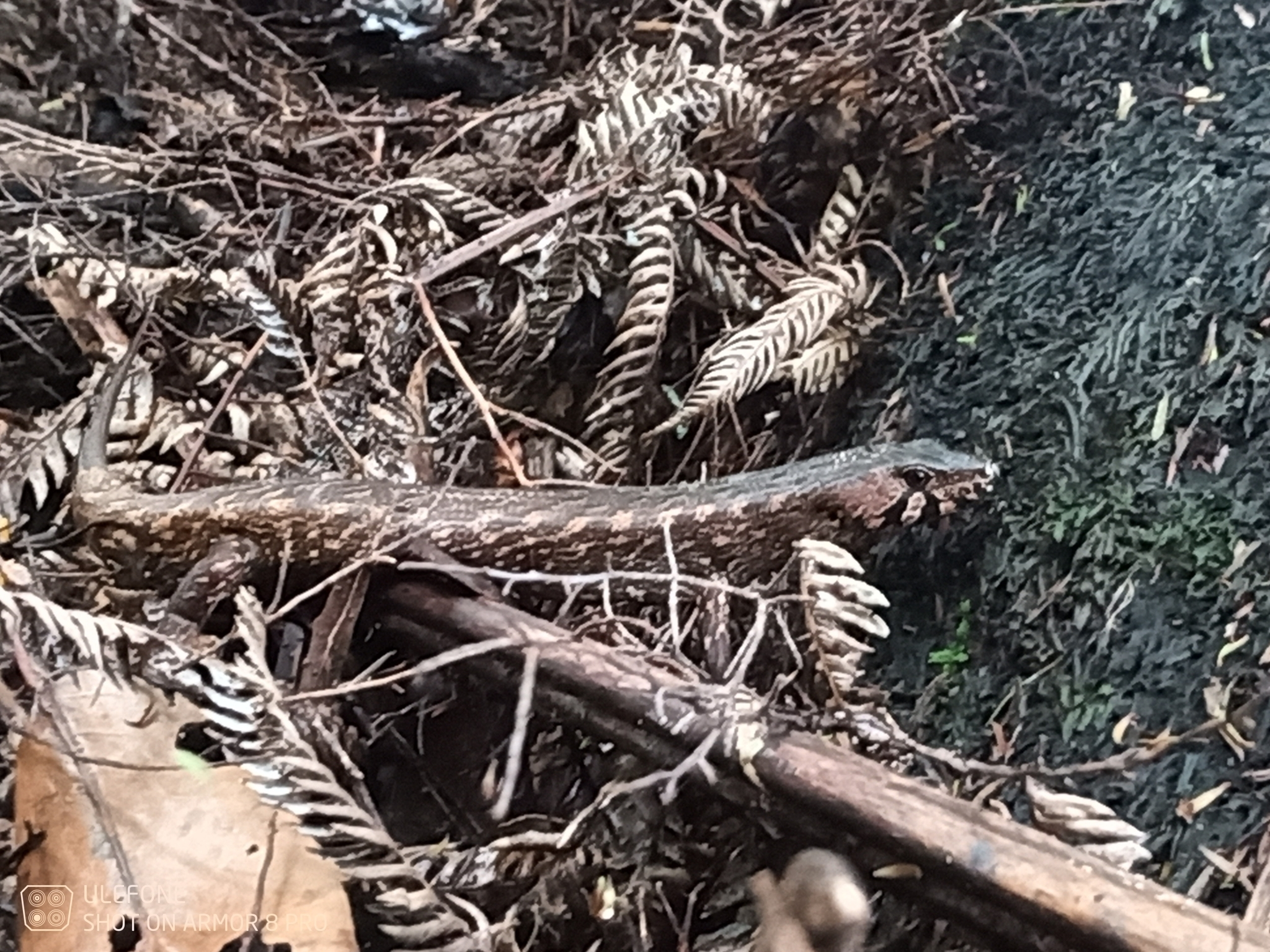
Chevron skink seen on Great Barrier Island
