= Mount Richmond Forest Park =

Forest park in New Zealand

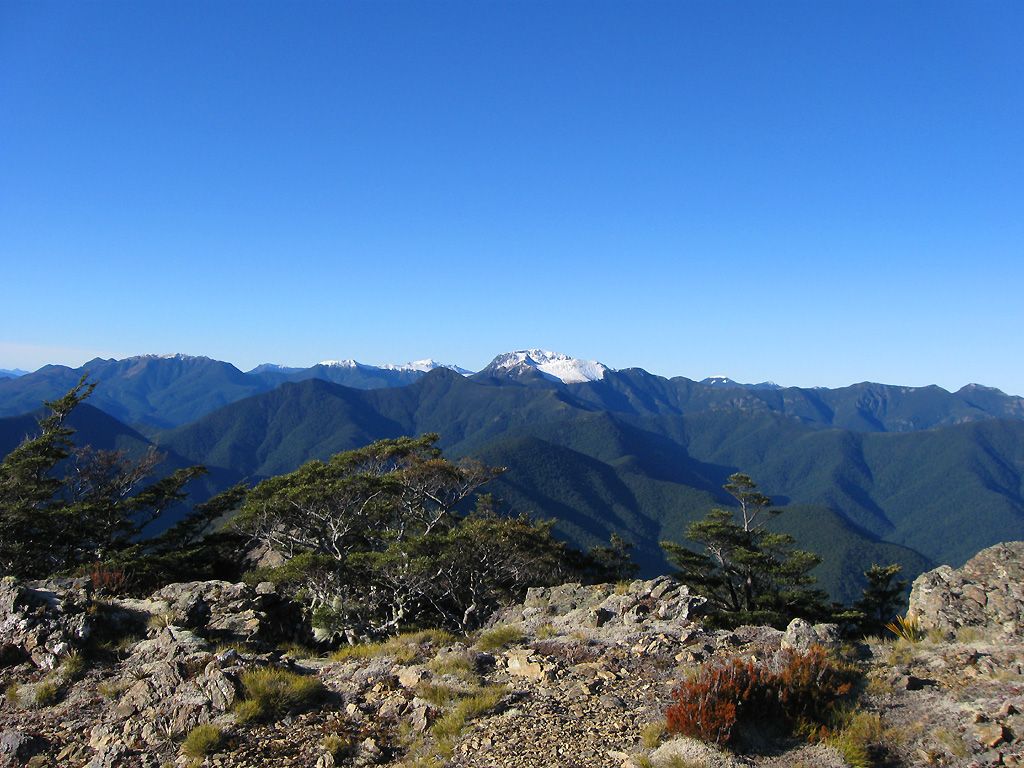
- Mounts Rintoul, Richmond, Fell and Fishtail, viewed from Gibbs Spur

- Location within New Zealand
- Location: South Island, New Zealand
- Nearest city: Nelson
- Coordinates: 41.47°S 173.35°E
- Area: 165,946.5 hectares (410,063 acres)
- Established: 1977
- Governing body: Department of Conservation

Mount Richmond Forest Park is a forest park in New Zealand, administered by the Department of Conservation.

Established in 1977, the forest park is located between Nelson and Marlborough and consists of 1,659 km^{2} (641 sq mi) of conservation estate. Around 80% of the area is covered in bush. The most notable peak in the forest park is Mount Richmond, which has an elevation above sea level of 1,760 metres (5,770 ft).

The park covers 165,946 hectares (410,060 acres).

== History ==
The future park was the location of New Zealand's first deadly civilian aviation incident associated with regular passenger air service. On 7 May 1942, a plane flying from Wellington to Nelson with two pilots and three passengers, was lost in the area. A subsequent investigation found a burnt out plane and no survivors on the upper slopes of Mount Richmond.

The park was established in 1977.

Te Araroa uses some of the 250 kilometers of tracks and huts in the forest park.
