= Red mistletoe =

Red mistletoe is a common name for several species of plants and may refer to:

- Peraxilla tetrapetala, endemic to New Zealand
- Tapinanthus rubromarginatus, native to South Africa
