= Mangarakau Wetland =

Wetland in the Tasman District, New Zealand

Coordinates: 40°38′31″S 172°29′04″E

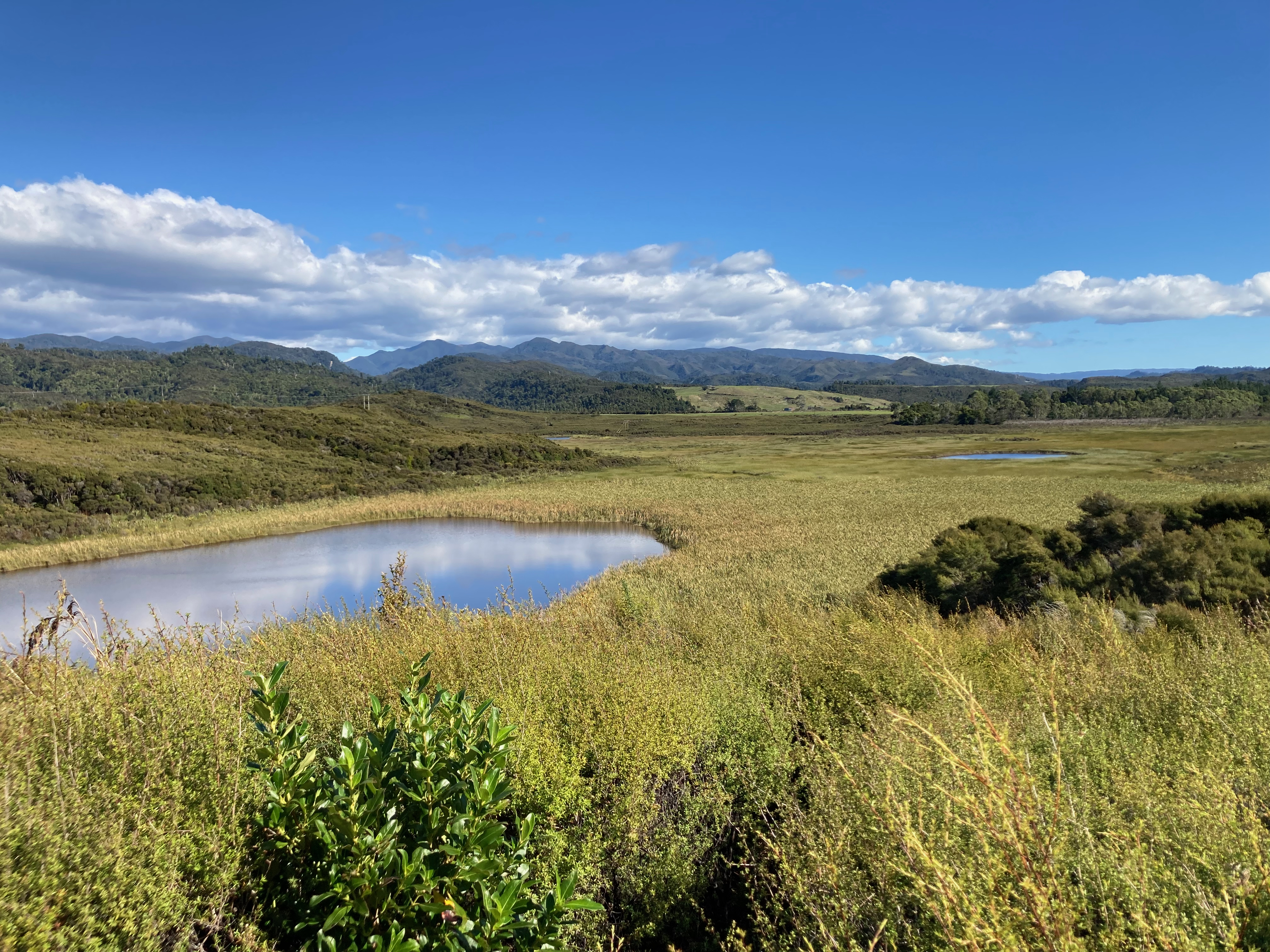
Mangarakau Wetland lakes - Big Pond and Little Pond

Mangarakau Wetland (or Mangarakau Swamp) is in the north-west Tasman District in the South Island of New Zealand. Situated south of the Whanganui Inlet and adjacent to the former settlement of Mangarakau, it is the largest swamp in the Nelson-Marlborough region. The wetlands drain into the Whanganui Inlet as well as into the Patarau River further south. It is owned by the Native Forest Restoration Trust and managed by the Friends of Mangarakau Swamp Inc.

== Geography ==
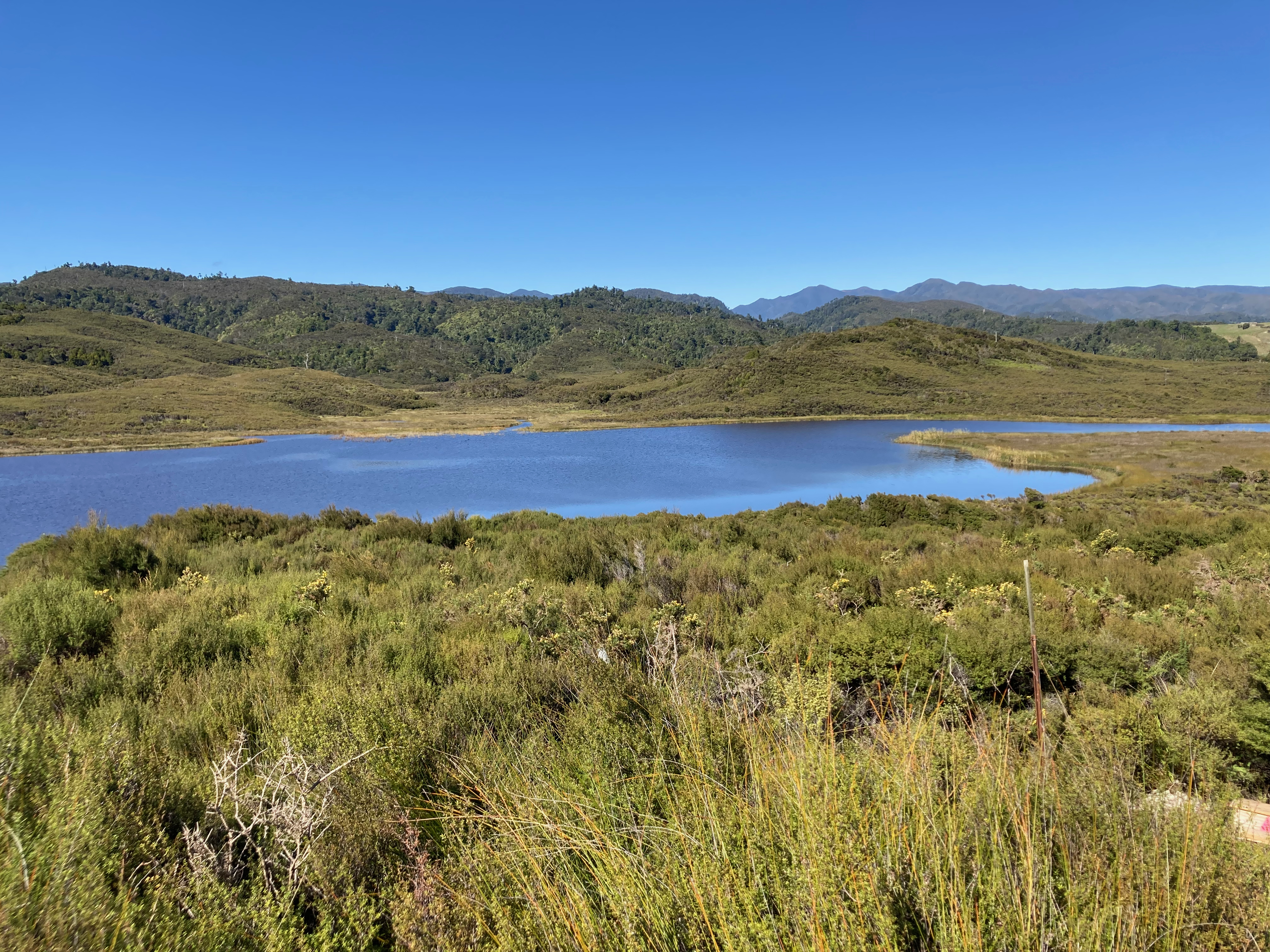
Lake Mangarakau

The freshwater wetland, south of the Whanganui Inlet, is the largest remaining wetland in the Nelson-Marlborough region. It covers an area of 350–400 hectares (860–990 acres). It is bordered by hills in the south-east and north-west, the latter being limestone. Streams from the hills drain into the wetland and to the south it drains into the Patarau River and to the north into the Whanganui Inlet. Soils are made up of peat.

There are three lakes within the wetland: Lake Mangarakau, Big Pond, and Little Pond. Lake Mangarakau is the largest, covering just over 14 hectares (35 acres).

== History ==
The wetland was once covered in kahikatea and pukatea forest and flax (harakeke). Settlers in the area and at the Mangarakau settlement practiced gold and coal mining, flax harvesting, logging and attempted to drain the wetland for farmland all of which threatened the wetland. In 2002 and 2004 fires destroyed wetland vegetation.

The Native Forest Restoration Trust owns the wetland which is protected by a Queen Elizabeth II National Trust covenant. Day-to-day management, restoration and conservation is carried out by the Friends of Mangarakau Swamp Inc.

In 2018 the Friends of Mangarakau Swamp, the Tasman District Council and the Department of Conservation applied to have the wetland listed by Ramsar, to give it international recognition. As of 2023 Mangarakau is not one of the seven Ramsar sites in New Zealand.

== Fauna and flora ==
A 2004 paper identified a large variety of flora and fauna: "native trees, shrubs, climbers and creepers number 100; orchids 33; ferns and fern allies 80; native herbs 70; naturalised plants 60; birds 50; fish and amphibians 13; and insects and land invertebrates 60. Plants and animal species total 466 so far, many of them being uncommon or rare, and more await discovery." There are four main vegetation types: Baumea arthrophylla sedgeland, Typha orientalis-Baumea arthrophylla raupō reedland, Gleichenia dicarpa fernland, Phormium tenax (harakeke) tussockland or flaxland. There are some remnants of lowland forest species such as kahikatea, beech, pukatea, northern and southern rātā, nīkau and tree ferns. Orchids, ferns and other species grow on the pakihi soils.

Native fish include mudfish, kokopu and inanga. Fernbirds and bitterns nest in the raupõ at the edge of the swamp.

== Gallery ==
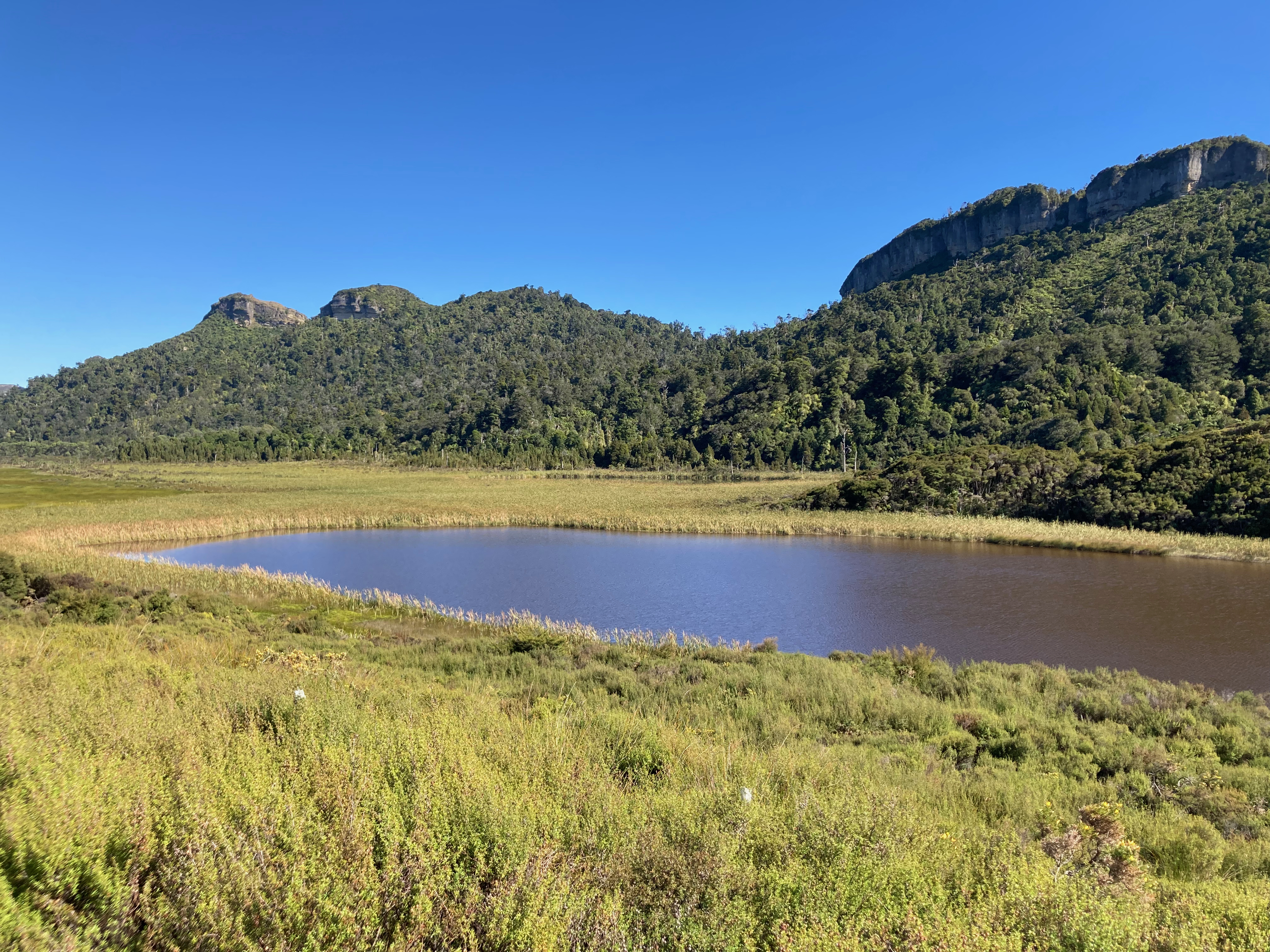
Big Pond looking towards the west

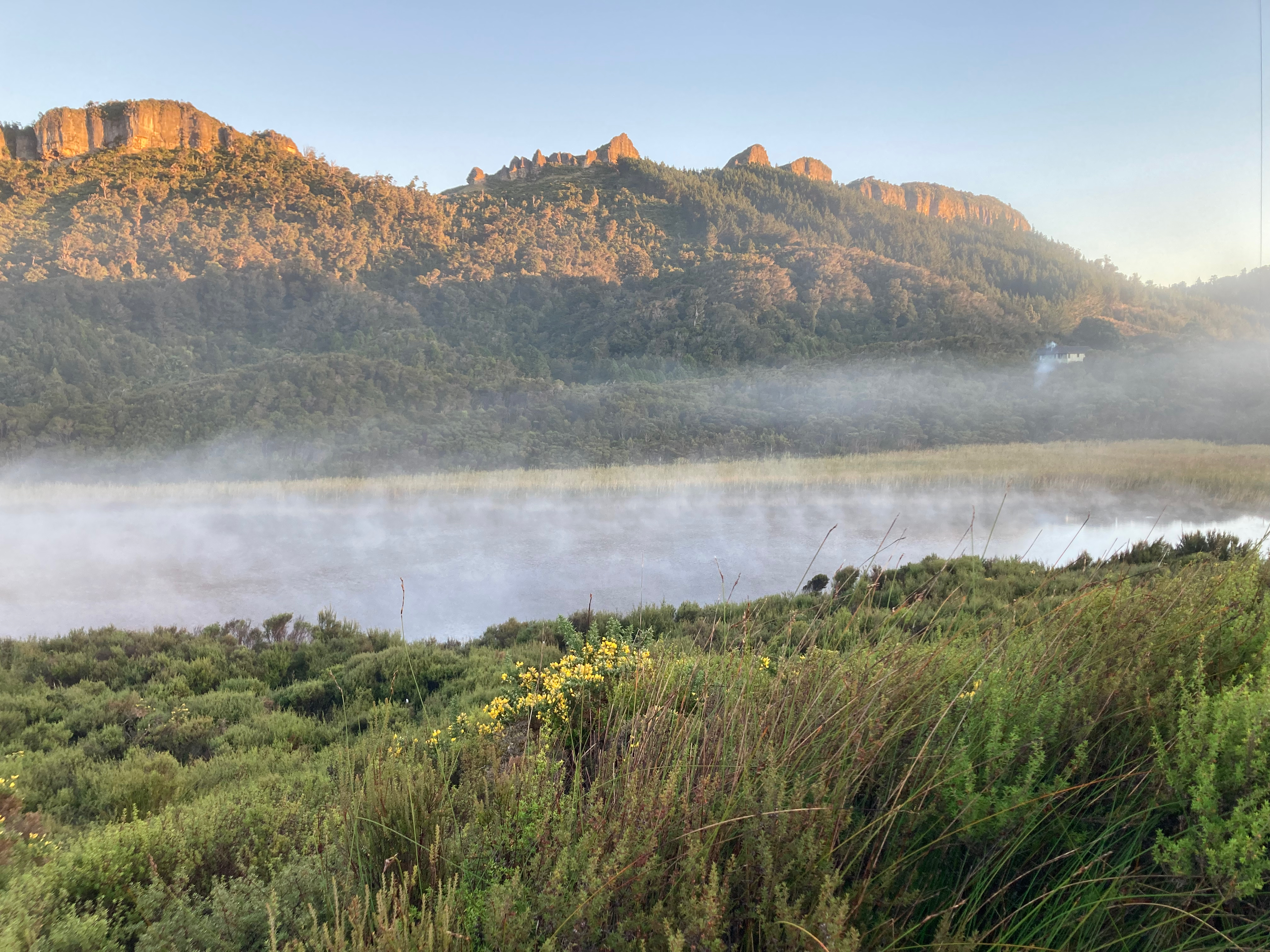
Big Pond looking towards the north-west

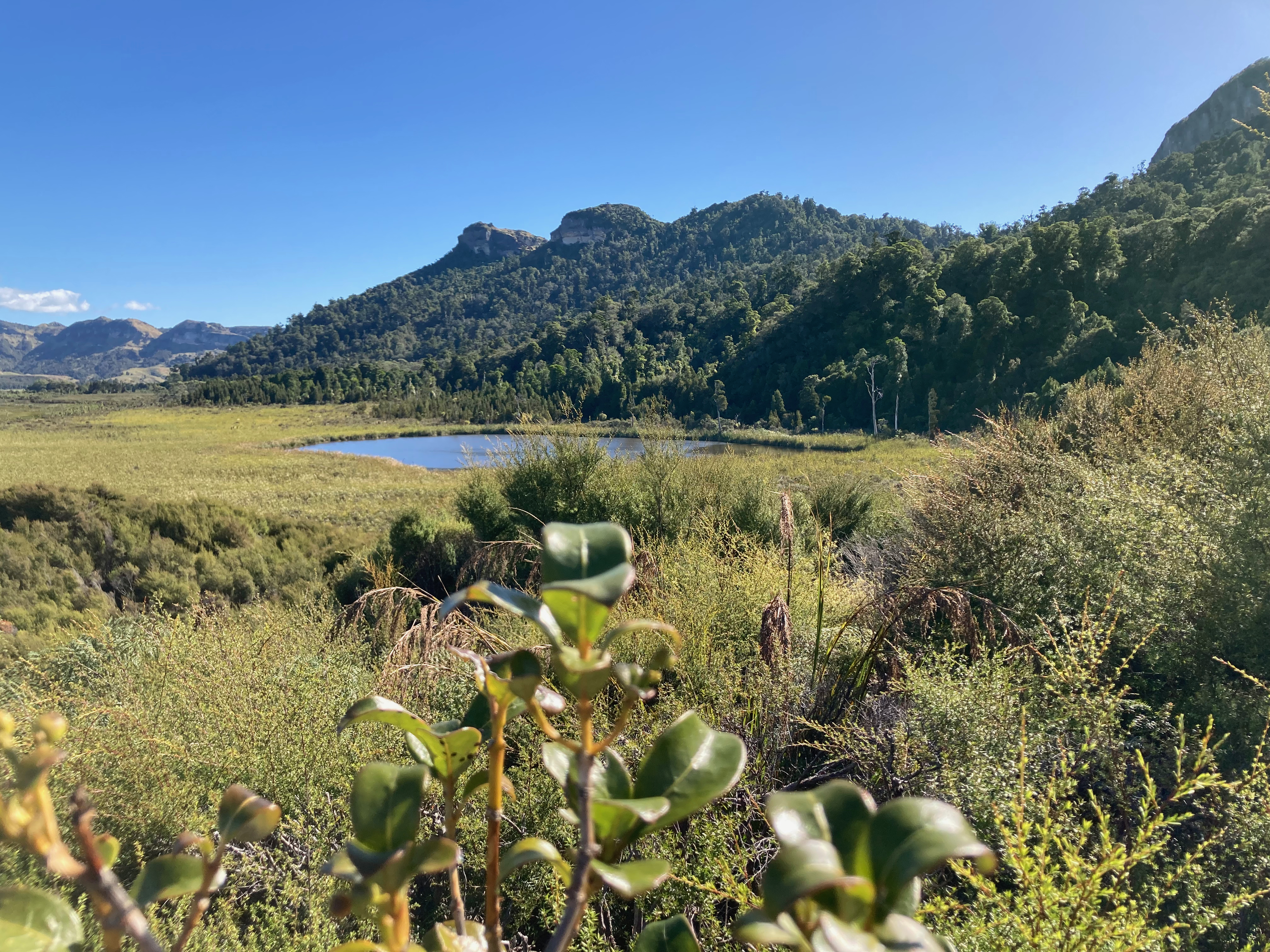
Little Pond looking towards the south-west

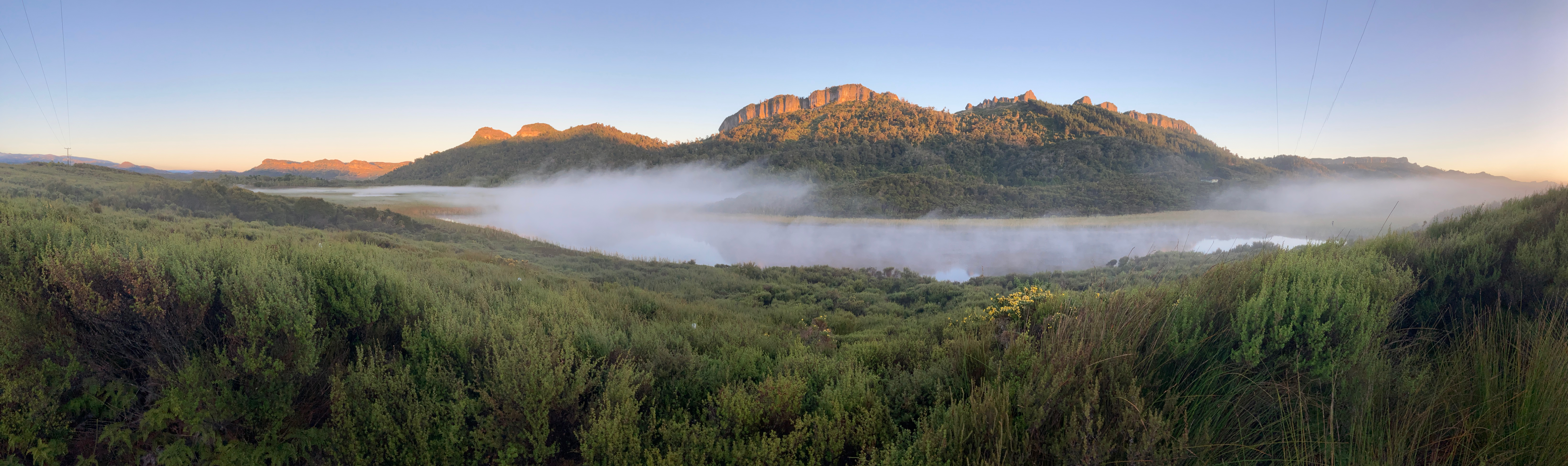
Big Pond looking towards limestone hills
