= Oteake Conservation Park =

Conservation park in New Zealand

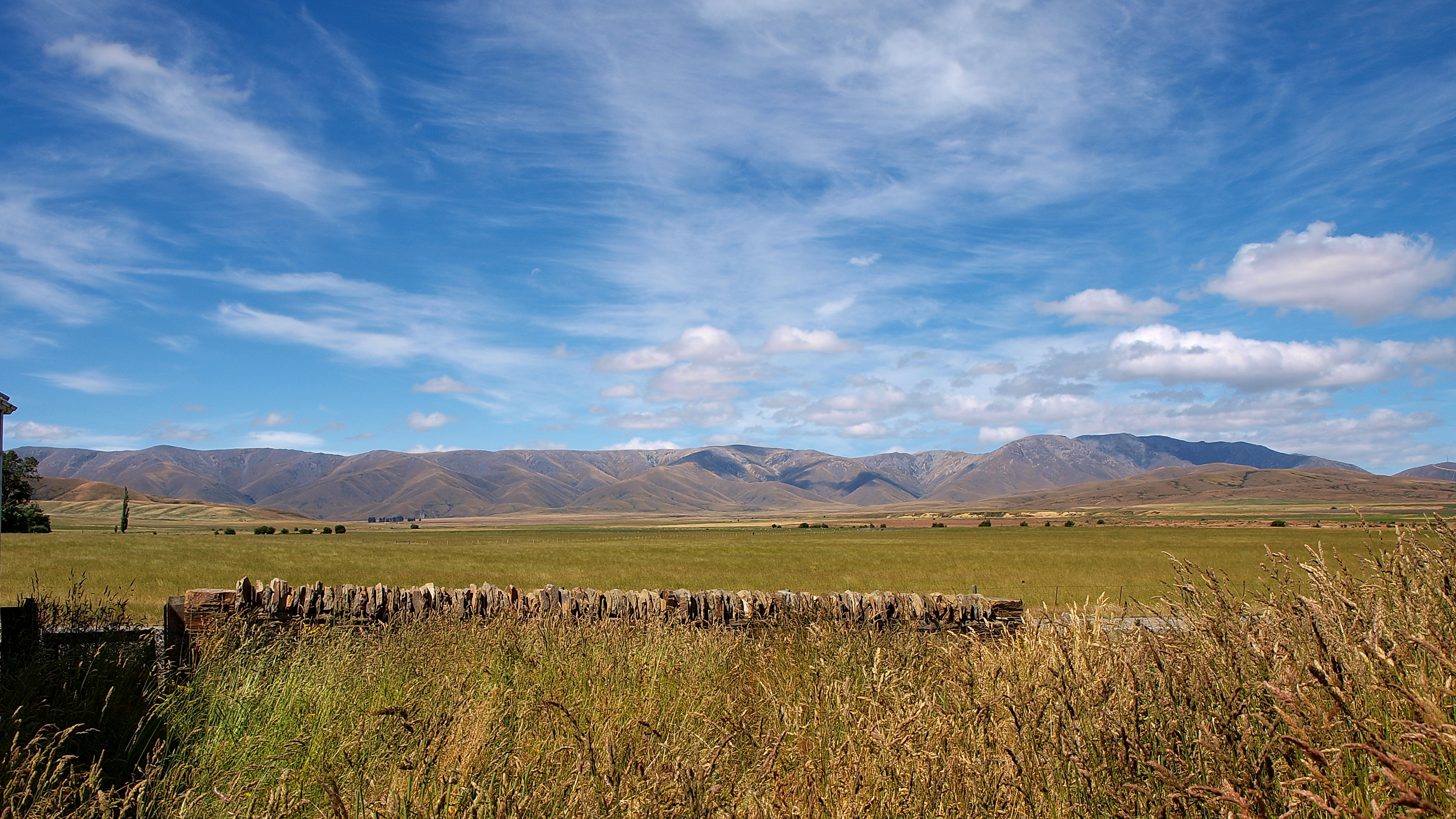
- Hawkdun Range

- Location within New Zealand
- Location: New Zealand
- Coordinates: 44.575084°S 170.086794°E
- Area: 65,160 hectares (161,000 acres)
- Established: 2010
- Governing body: Department of Conservation

Oteake Conservation Park is a protected area in the Waitaki District and the Canterbury and Otago regions of New Zealand's South Island. The Kāi Tahu iwi believe that Oteake ("place of the ake") is named for the akeake (Olearia avicenniifolia), a shrub daisy found throughout the park. The park is managed by the New Zealand Department of Conservation.

== Geography ==
The park covers 65,160 hectares (161,000 acres). It is located south of Omarama, Otematata and Lake Benmore. The Manuherikia River flows through the park which then forms the water race and water supply for the township of Naseby.

== History ==
Oteake was an important location for local Māori for gathering food and resources. There has also been evidence of Māori stone quarries in the upper Manuherikia River.

Early European activity in the area dates to the 1850s and is distributed across multiple site of gold diggings and farming. In July 1863, gold was discovered in the area around Mt Buster and Mt Kyeburn and attracted many miners to the area. The Buster Diggings were a successful mining operation and remnants of the site can still be seen today with sluicing, huts and artifacts of gold mining.

The park was established in 2010.

== Flora and fauna ==
The Oteake Conservation Park is largely covered in tussock grasses and shrubs. It is a unique conservation area where many Otago species reach their northern limit of growth and Canterbury species their southern limit of growth. The park is home to many species of alpine shrubs and herbs, including scree pea (Montigena novae-zelandiae).

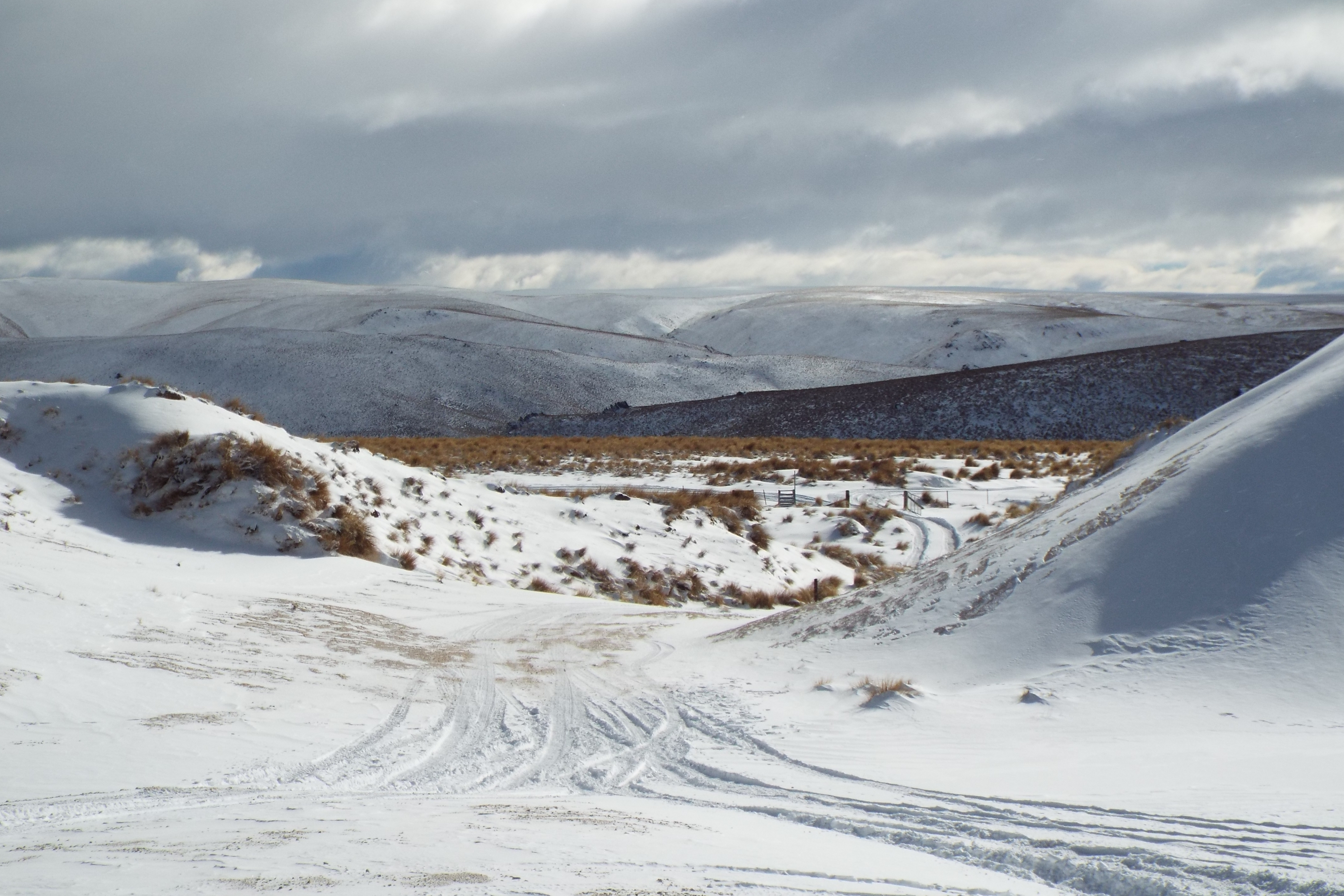
Mt Buster Diggings

The park is home to the New Zealand falcon or kārearea, which is often seen by visitors to the park. It is also a refuge for many rare native fish. The roundhead galaxias (Galaxias anomalus) and flathead galaxias (Galaxias depressiceps) are found in its creeks, streams and rivers.
