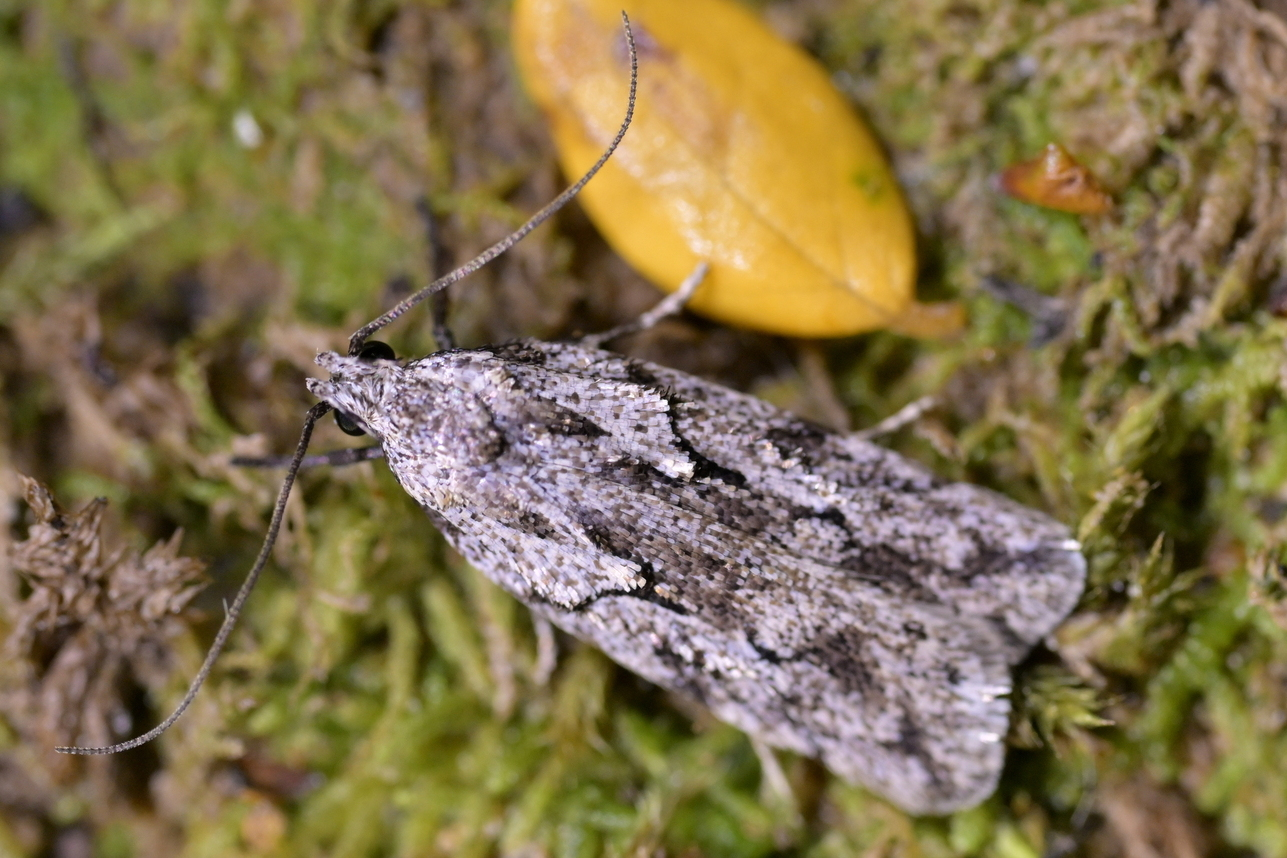

Scientific classification
- Kingdom: Animalia
- Phylum: Arthropoda
- Class: Insecta
- Order: Lepidoptera
- Family: Oecophoridae
- Genus: Izatha
- Species: I. apodoxa

Binomial name
- Izatha apodoxa (Meyrick, 1888)

Synonyms
- Semiocosma apodoxa Meyrick, 1888

= Izatha apodoxa =

Species of moth

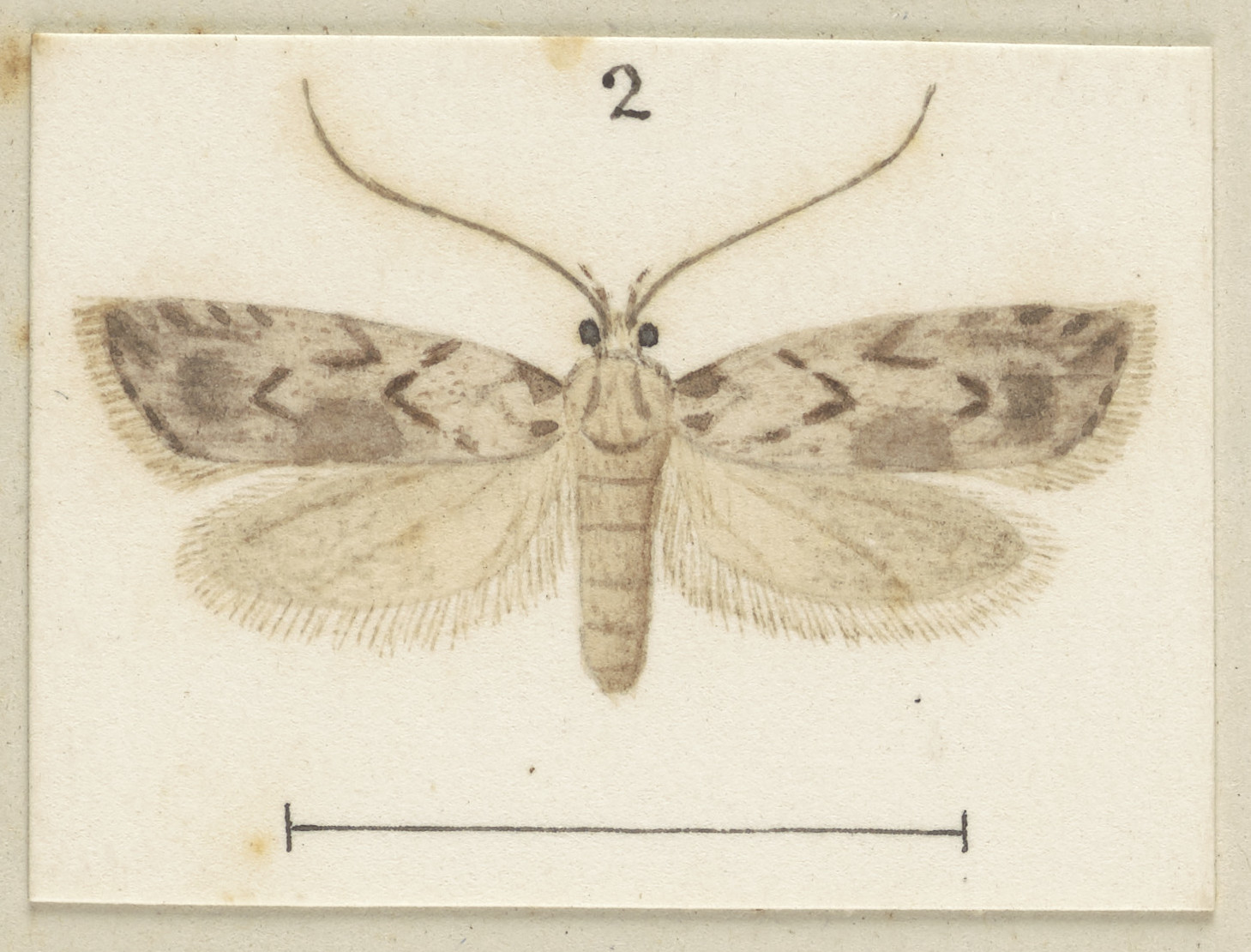
Watercolour of Izatha apodoxa (c. 1927)

Izatha apodoxa is a moth of the family Oecophoridae. It is endemic to New Zealand, where it is known from scattered localities in the southern North Island. This species is variable in appearance and comes in two forms, a grey form and a black and white form. In the grey form it is very similar in appearance to I. notodoxa and in the black and white form to I. katadiktya. At present the larvae and biology of this species are unknown.

== Taxonomy ==
Edward Meyrick first described this species in 1888 using specimens obtained by A. Purdie and George Hudson in Wellington. Meyrick named the species Semiocosma apodoxa. This species was placed in the genus Izatha by Meyrick in 1905. Hudson discussed and illustrated this species under its current name of I. apodoxa in his 1928 book The butterflies and moths of New Zealand. The lectotype specimen is held at the Natural History Museum, London.

== Description ==
Meyrick described the species as follows:

Male, female. — 21-26 mm. Head whitish, lower margin of face and maxillary palpi dark fuscous. Palpi white, second joint with lower half and a subapical ring fuscous, terminal joint with a blackish median band. Antennae dark fuscous. Thorax whitish, with a few fuscous scales. Abdomen grey-whitish. Legs dark fuscous, posterior pair whitish. Forewings elongate, costa slightly arched, apex obtuse, hindmargin nearly straight, rather oblique; white, irregularly irrorated with light greyish-fuscous; a small fuscous spot at base of costa, and a dot near base in middle; a slender dark fuscous streak from 1/4 of costa to disc before middle, its extremity furcate; a small fuscous spot beneath costa near beyond this; a fuscous-grey suffused patch towards middle third of inner margin, and a similar roundish patch above anal angle; an angulated dark fuscous mark in disc beyond middle; a short oblique irregular cloudy fuscous streak from apex; a hindmarginal row of cloudy fuscous dots : cilia whitish, irrorated with light greyish-fuscous. Hindwings grey- whitish, faintly ochreous-tinged; a faint darker discal dot; a slight greyish suffusion towards apex; cilia grey- whitish.

The wingspan is 20.5–26.5 mm for males and about 21 mm for females. I. apodoxa is very variable in its forewing pattern and also comes in two forms, a grey form and a black and white form. The grey form of I. apodoxa is indistinctly marked and similar in appearance to I. notodoxa. These two species are not reliably distinguished on external characters but can be distinguished by the male genital characters as well as by their geographical location. I. apodoxa is only found in the North Island and I. notodoxa in the South Island. The black and white form of I. apodoxa is similar in appearance to I. katadiktya. The two species can be distinguished by examining the basal patch on the forewing. In well marked specimens of I. apodoxa the forewing has no pale inclusion below the fold but with I. katadiktya it almost always contains a white or pale grey patch.

== Distribution ==
This species is endemic to New Zealand. It is restricted to the North Island and can be found south from Taupō in scattered locations. Other than the type locality of Wellington it has also been found Taranaki, Hawkes Bay, Rangitikei and Wairarapa. Only the grey form of this species has been found in Wellington and very few specimens have been collected outside of this locality. Specimens obtained in Taranaki and Rangitikei have been of the black and white form but examination of the genitalia has shown they are of the same species.

== Biology and behaviour ==
The larvae and biology of this species is unknown as at 2010. Adults of this species have been recorded in December and January. Hudson states that the species has been seen in November and adults could be found resting on fences in Wellington city.

== Habitat and host species ==
It is likely that the larvae of this species either consumes decomposing plant matter, dead wood or alternatively fungi or lichens.
