= Izatha notodoxa =

Conservation status
- Data Deficit (NZ TCS)

Scientific classification
- Kingdom: Animalia
- Phylum: Arthropoda
- Clade: Pancrustacea
- Class: Insecta
- Order: Lepidoptera
- Family: Oecophoridae
- Subfamily: Oecophorinae
- Genus: Izatha
- Species: I. notodoxa

Binomial name
- Izatha notodoxa Hoare, 2010

Species of moth

Izatha notodoxa is a moth of the family Oecophoridae. This species was first described by Robert Hoare in 2010. It is endemic to New Zealand, where it is known from the northern South Island. In 2025 this species was classified as "data deficient" under the New Zealand Threat Classification System.

== Description ==
The wingspan is 19–23 mm for males and 22–23 mm for females.

== Distribution ==
This species is endemic to New Zealand and is found in the northern parts of the South Island.

== Behaviour ==
Adults have been recorded in October, November and January.

== Conservation status ==
In 2025 this species was classified by the New Zealand Department of Conservation as "data deficient" under the New Zealand Threat Classification System.
