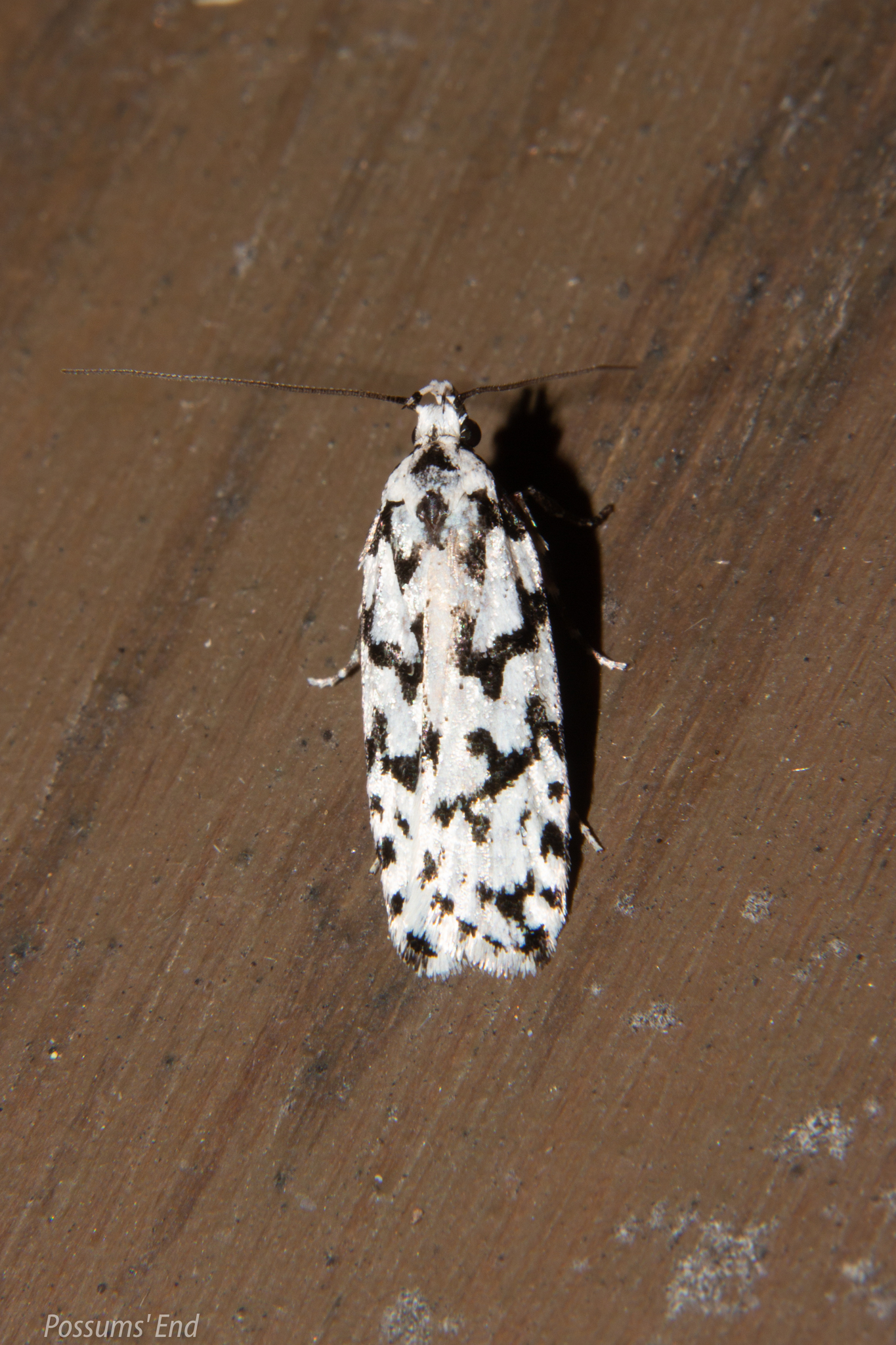

Scientific classification
- Kingdom: Animalia
- Phylum: Arthropoda
- Class: Insecta
- Order: Lepidoptera
- Family: Oecophoridae
- Genus: Izatha
- Species: I. katadiktya

Binomial name
- Izatha katadiktya Hoare, 2010

= Izatha katadiktya =

Species of moth

Izatha katadiktya is a moth of the family Oecophoridae. It is endemic to New Zealand, where it is known from the eastern South Island, and probably Hawkes Bay.

The wingspan is 21–27.5 mm for males and 21.5–30 mm for females. Adults have been recorded in October, November and January.

Larvae feed on dead wood.
