= List of Myrsine species =

Myrsine is a genus of flowering plants in the family Primulaceae, with a pantropical distribution. As of August 2025, Plants of the World Online accepts the following 283 species:

- Myrsine achradifolia F.Muell.
- Myrsine acrantha Krug & Urb.
- Myrsine acrosticta (Mez) Pipoly
- Myrsine acutiloba (Mez) Ricketson & Pipoly
- Myrsine adamsonii Fosberg & Sachet
- Myrsine affinis A.DC.
- Myrsine africana L.
- Myrsine albiflorens (M.Schmid) Ricketson & Pipoly
- Myrsine altomontana M.F.Freitas & Kin.-Gouv.
- Myrsine alyxifolia Hosaka
- Myrsine amischocarpa (A.C.Sm.) Ricketson & Pipoly
- Myrsine amorosoana Pipoly
- Myrsine andersonii Fosberg & Sachet
- Myrsine andina (Mez) Pipoly
- Myrsine angusta Jackes
- Myrsine apoensis (Elmer) Pipoly
- Myrsine aquilonia de Lange & Heenan
- Myrsine aralioides (Philipson) Pipoly
- Myrsine arborea (M.Schmid) Ricketson & Pipoly
- Myrsine arenaria Jackes
- Myrsine arfakensis (Kaneh. & Hatus.) Pipoly
- Myrsine argentea Heenan & de Lange
- Myrsine asymmetrica (Mez) Ricketson & Pipoly
- Myrsine augustae (Mez) Pipoly
- Myrsine australis (A.Rich.) Allan
- Myrsine avenis (Blume) A.DC.
- Myrsine balansae (Mez) Otegui
- Myrsine belepensis (M.Schmid) Ricketson & Pipoly
- Myrsine benthamiana (Mez) Ewart
- Myrsine bissei Panfet
- Myrsine boivinii (Mez) Ricketson & Pipoly
- Myrsine borneensis Scheff.
- Myrsine boulindaensis (M.Schmid) Ricketson & Pipoly
- Myrsine brassii (P.Royen) B.J.Conn
- Myrsine brevis (J.F.Macbr.) Pipoly
- Myrsine brownii Fosberg & Sachet
- Myrsine bullata Pipoly
- Myrsine cacuminum (Mez) Pipoly
- Myrsine calcarata (Lundell) Lundell
- Myrsine capitellata Wall.
- Myrsine carolinensis (Mez) Fosberg & Sachet
- Myrsine ceylanica (Mez) Wadhwa
- Myrsine chathamica F.Muell.
- Myrsine cheesemanii (Mez) Hemsl. ex Prain
- Myrsine cicatricosa (C.Y.Wu & C.Chen) Pipoly & C.Chen
- Myrsine cipoensis M.F.Freitas & Kin.-Gouv.
- Myrsine cirrhosa Lorence & K.R.Wood
- Myrsine citrifolia (Mez) Ricketson & Pipoly
- Myrsine clemensiae (Sleumer) Pipoly
- Myrsine cochin-chinensis A.DC.
- Myrsine collina Nadeaud
- Myrsine comorensis (Mez) Ricketson & Pipoly
- Myrsine congesta (Schwacke ex Mez) Pipoly
- Myrsine cordata Scheff.
- Myrsine coriacea (Sw.) R.Br. ex Roem. & Schult.
- Myrsine coriifolia (Sleumer) Pipoly
- Myrsine courboniana (Mez) Ricketson & Pipoly
- Myrsine coxii Cockayne
- Myrsine crassifolia R.Br.
- Myrsine crassiramea (A.C.Sm.) Ricketson & Pipoly
- Myrsine cristalensis Borhidi
- Myrsine cruciata (Philipson) Pipoly
- Myrsine cubana A.DC.
- Myrsine cupuliformis Pipoly
- Myrsine daphnoides (Mez) Ricketson & Pipoly
- Myrsine dasyphylla Stapf
- Myrsine degeneri Hosaka
- Myrsine densiflora Scheff.
- Myrsine denticulata (Wawra) Hosaka
- Myrsine dependens (Ruiz & Pav.) Spreng.
- Myrsine diazii Pipoly
- Myrsine dicksonii (P.Royen) Pipoly
- Myrsine dilloniana Pipoly
- Myrsine diminuta (Mez) Ricketson & Pipoly
- Myrsine discocarpa (M.Schmid) Ricketson & Pipoly
- Myrsine divaricata A.Cunn.
- Myrsine dumbeaensis (M.Schmid) Ricketson & Pipoly
- Myrsine elata Jackes
- Myrsine elliptica E.Walker
- Myrsine emarginella Miq.
- Myrsine exquisitorum Utteridge & Lepschi
- Myrsine faberi (Mez) Pipoly & C.Chen
- Myrsine fasciculata (J.W.Moore) Fosberg & Sachet
- Myrsine fastigiata (Elmer) Pipoly
- Myrsine fernseei (Mez) Hosaka
- Myrsine forbesii (Mez) Ricketson & Pipoly
- Myrsine fosbergii Hosaka
- Myrsine fosteri Pipoly
- Myrsine fusca (J.W.Moore) Fosberg & Sachet
- Myrsine gardneriana A.DC.
- Myrsine gilliana Sond.
- Myrsine glandulosa (Elmer) Pipoly
- Myrsine glazioviana Warm.
- Myrsine gomphostigma (Mez) Pipoly
- Myrsine gracilissima Fosberg & Sachet
- Myrsine grandifolia (S.Moore) Ricketson & Pipoly
- Myrsine griffithiana (Mez) Ricketson & Pipoly
- Myrsine guianensis (Aubl.) Kuntze
- Myrsine hadrocarpa (A.C.Sm.) Ricketson & Pipoly
- Myrsine hartii (M.L.Grant) Fosberg & Sachet
- Myrsine hasseltii Blume ex Scheff.
- Myrsine helleri (O.Deg. & I.Deg.) H.St.John
- Myrsine hermogenesii (Jung-Mend. & Bernacci) M.F.Freitas & Kin.-Gouv.
- Myrsine hosakae H.St.John
- Myrsine howittiana (Mez) F.Muell. ex Prain
- Myrsine humboldtensis (M.Schmid) Ricketson & Pipoly
- Myrsine inaequalis (Kaneh. & Hatus.) Pipoly
- Myrsine involucrata (Mez) Pipoly
- Myrsine ireneae Jackes
- Myrsine juddii Hosaka
- Myrsine juergensenii (Mez) Ricketson & Pipoly
- Myrsine katrikouensis (M.Schmidt) Ricketson & Pipoly
- Myrsine kauaiensis Hillebr.
- Myrsine kermadecensis Cheeseman
- Myrsine kimberleyensis Jackes
- Myrsine knudsenii (Rock) Hosaka
- Myrsine koghiensis (M.Schmid) Ricketson & Pipoly
- Myrsine korthalsii Miq.
- Myrsine kuebiniensis (M.Schmid) Ricketson & Pipoly
- Myrsine kwangsiensis (E.Walker) Pipoly & C.Chen
- Myrsine laetevirens (Mez) Arechav.
- Myrsine lamii (Sleumer) Pipoly
- Myrsine lanaiensis Hillebr.
- Myrsine lanceolata Pancher & Sebert
- Myrsine lancifolia Mart.
- Myrsine latifolia (Ruiz & Pav.) Spreng.
- Myrsine laurifolia Casar.
- Myrsine lecardii (Mez) Ricketson & Pipoly
- Myrsine lechleri (Mez) Pipoly
- Myrsine ledermannii (Mez) Fosberg & Sachet
- Myrsine lehmannii (Standl.) Pipoly
- Myrsine lessertiana A.DC.
- Myrsine leucantha (K.Schum.) Pipoly
- Myrsine leucobrachya (P.Royen) P.I.Forst.
- Myrsine leuconeura Mart.
- Myrsine ligustrina (Mez) Otegui
- Myrsine linearifolia Hosaka
- Myrsine linearis (Lour.) Poir.
- Myrsine lineata (Mez) Imkhan.
- Myrsine loefgrenii (Mez) Imkhan.
- Myrsine longifolia Nadeaud
- Myrsine longipes (A.C.Sm.) Ricketson & Pipoly
- Myrsine lorentziana (Mez) Arechav.
- Myrsine luae Ricketson & Pipoly
- Myrsine macrocarpa Pipoly
- Myrsine macrophylla (Mez) Pancher & Sebert ex Prain
- Myrsine maculata Jackes
- Myrsine madagascariensis A.DC.
- Myrsine magnoliifolia (Urb. & Ekman) Alain
- Myrsine maguireana Pipoly
- Myrsine manglillo (Lam.) R.Br.
- Myrsine matensis (Mez) Otegui
- Myrsine maximowiczii (Koidz.) E.Walker
- Myrsine mccomishii (Sprague) Jackes
- Myrsine mcphersonii (M.Schmid) Ricketson & Pipoly
- Myrsine medeciloae Pipoly
- Myrsine melanophloeos (L.) R.Br. ex Sweet
- Myrsine memaoyaensis (M.Schmid) Ricketson & Pipoly
- Myrsine mezii Hosaka
- Myrsine microdonta Pipoly
- Myrsine mindanaensis (Elmer) Pipoly
- Myrsine minima (Steyerm.) Pipoly
- Myrsine minutiflora Pipoly
- Myrsine minutifolia (Knoester, Wijn & Sleumer) Pipoly
- Myrsine mocquerysii Aug.DC.
- Myrsine modesta (Mez) Ricketson & Pipoly
- Myrsine × montana (Hook.f.) Hook.f.
- Myrsine monticola Mart.
- Myrsine multibracteata (Merr.) Pipoly
- Myrsine munzingeri (M.Schmid) Ricketson & Pipoly
- Myrsine myricifolia A.Gray
- Myrsine myrtillina (Mez) Jackes
- Myrsine niauensis Fosberg & Sachet
- Myrsine nigricans (M.Schmid) Ricketson & Pipoly
- Myrsine nitens (M.Schmid) Ricketson & Pipoly
- Myrsine nitida (Mez) Pipoly
- Myrsine novocaledonica (Mez) Ricketson & Pipoly
- Myrsine nubicola Alain
- Myrsine nukuhivensis Fosberg & Sachet
- Myrsine nummularia Hook.f.
- Myrsine oblanceolata (M.Schmid) Ricketson & Pipoly
- Myrsine oblongibacca (Merr.) Pipoly
- Myrsine obovalifolia (M.Schmid) Ricketson & Pipoly
- Myrsine obovata (J.W.Moore) Fosberg & Sachet
- Myrsine okabeana (Tuyama) E.Walker
- Myrsine oligophylla Zahlbr.
- Myrsine oliveri Allan
- Myrsine oreophila Jackes
- Myrsine orohenensis (J.W.Moore) Fosberg & Sachet
- Myrsine ouameniensis (M.Schmid) Ricketson & Pipoly
- Myrsine ouazangouensis (M.Schmid) Ricketson & Pipoly
- Myrsine ovalis Nadeaud
- Myrsine ovicarpa (M.Schmid) Ricketson & Pipoly
- Myrsine palauensis (Mez) Fosberg & Sachet
- Myrsine paniensis (M.Schmid) Ricketson & Pipoly
- Myrsine papuana Hemsl.
- Myrsine paramensis (Cuatrec.) Pipoly
- Myrsine parvicarpa (M.Schmid) Ricketson & Pipoly
- Myrsine parvifolia A.DC.
- Myrsine pearcei (Mez) Pipoly
- Myrsine pedicellata Jackes
- Myrsine pellucida (Ruiz & Pav.) Spreng.
- Myrsine pellucidopunctata Oerst.
- Myrsine pellucidostriata (Gilg & G.Schellenb.) Pipoly & Ricketson
- Myrsine penduliflora A.DC.
- Myrsine penibukana (Philipson) Pipoly
- Myrsine perakensis King & Gamble
- Myrsine peregrina (Mez) Pipoly
- Myrsine perreticulata Pipoly
- Myrsine petiolata Hosaka
- Myrsine picta H.Low ex Sankey
- Myrsine picturata Pipoly
- Myrsine pillansii Adamson
- Myrsine pipolyi Panfet
- Myrsine platystigma F.Muell.
- Myrsine polyantha (A.C.Sm.) Ricketson & Pipoly
- Myrsine porosa F.Muell.
- Myrsine poumensis (M.Schmid) Ricketson & Pipoly
- Myrsine pronyensis (Guillaumin) Ricketson & Pipoly
- Myrsine pseudocrenata (Mez) Pipoly
- Myrsine pukooensis (H.Lév.) Hosaka
- Myrsine punctata (H.Lév.) Wilbur
- Myrsine raiateensis (J.W.Moore) Fosberg & Sachet
- Myrsine ralstoniae (P.S.Green) Jackes
- Myrsine rapensis (F.Br.) Fosberg & Sachet
- Myrsine rawacensis A.DC.
- Myrsine resinosa (A.C.Sm.) Pipoly
- Myrsine revoluta (Kaneh. & Hatus.) Pipoly
- Myrsine reynelii Pipoly
- Myrsine rhombata (P.Royen) Pipoly
- Myrsine richmondensis Jackes
- Myrsine rivularis (Mez) Pipoly
- Myrsine robusta (Mez) Wadhwa
- Myrsine rolletii R.A.Howard
- Myrsine ronuiensis (M.L.Grant) Fosberg & Sachet
- Myrsine rubiginosa Jackes
- Myrsine rubra M.F.Freitas & Kin.-Gouv.
- Myrsine salicina (Hook.f.) Heward ex Hook.f.
- Myrsine sandwicensis A.DC.
- Myrsine seguinii H.Lév.
- Myrsine semiserrata Wall.
- Myrsine serpenticola Jackes
- Myrsine sessiliflora (Mez) Pipoly
- Myrsine seychellarum (Mez) Ricketson & Pipoly
- Myrsine smithii Jackes
- Myrsine sodiroana (Mez) Pipoly
- Myrsine spissifolia (M.Schmid) Ricketson & Pipoly
- Myrsine sprucei (Mez) Pipoly
- Myrsine squarrosa (Mez) M.F.Freitas & Kin.-Gouv.
- Myrsine stenophylla (Mez) Ricketson & Pipoly
- Myrsine stolonifera (Koidz.) E.Walker
- Myrsine striata (Mez) Ricketson & Pipoly
- Myrsine subsessilis F.Muell.
- Myrsine sumatrana Miq.
- Myrsine tahuatensis Fosberg & Sachet
- Myrsine taitensis A.Gray
- Myrsine taomensis (M.Schmid) Ricketson & Pipoly
- Myrsine tchingouensis (M.Schmid) Ricketson & Pipoly
- Myrsine tempanpan (P.Royen) Pipoly
- Myrsine thwaitesii (Mez) Wadhwa
- Myrsine trinitatis A.DC.
- Myrsine tuihanaensis Butaud & F.Jacq
- Myrsine turquinensis Panfet
- Myrsine umbellata Mart.
- Myrsine umbricola Heenan & de Lange
- Myrsine urceolata R.Br.
- Myrsine vaccinioides W.L.Wagner, D.R.Herbst & Sohmer
- Myrsine variabilis R.Br.
- Myrsine velutina (Knoester, Wijn & Sleumer) Pipoly
- Myrsine venosa A.DC.
- Myrsine verrucosa (M.Schmid) Ricketson & Pipoly
- Myrsine verruculosa (C.Y.Wu) Pipoly & C.Chen
- Myrsine vescoi Drake
- Myrsine villicaulis (Mez) Imkhan.
- Myrsine villosissima Mart.
- Myrsine warrae W.N.Takeuchi & Pipoly
- Myrsine wawrae (Mez) Hosaka
- Myrsine weberbaueri (Mez) Pipoly
- Myrsine wettsteinii (Mez) Otegui
- Myrsine wightiana Wall. ex A.DC.
- Myrsine womersleyi (Sleumer) Pipoly
- Myrsine wrayi King & Gamble
- Myrsine yateensis (M.Schmid) Ricketson & Pipoly
- Myrsine youngii Pipoly
