= Myrsine obovata =

Conservation status
- Data Deficient (IUCN 3.1)

Scientific classification
- Kingdom: Plantae
- Clade: Embryophytes
- Clade: Tracheophytes
- Clade: Angiosperms
- Clade: Eudicots
- Clade: Asterids
- Order: Ericales
- Family: Primulaceae
- Genus: Myrsine
- Species: M. obovata

Binomial name
- Myrsine obovata (J.W.Moore) Fosberg & Sachet (1975)

Synonyms
- Rapanea obovata J.W.Moore (1933)

Species of flowering plant

Myrsine obovata is a species of flowering plant in the family Primulaceae. It is a shrub or small tree endemic to the island of Raiatea in the Society Islands of French Polynesia.
