= Myrsine adamsonii =

Conservation status
- Data Deficient (IUCN 2.3)

Scientific classification
- Kingdom: Plantae
- Clade: Tracheophytes
- Clade: Angiosperms
- Clade: Eudicots
- Clade: Asterids
- Order: Ericales
- Family: Primulaceae
- Genus: Myrsine
- Species: M. adamsonii

Binomial name
- Myrsine adamsonii Fosberg & Sachet (1975)

Synonyms
- Myrsine grantii Fosberg & Sachet (1975); Myrsine grantii var. toviiensis Fosberg & Sachet (1975); Rapanea myricifolia f. marquesensis F.Br. (1935)

Species of flowering plant

Myrsine adamsonii is a species of plant in the family Primulaceae. It is endemic to the Marquesas Islands of French Polynesia.

The epithet adamsonii commemorates Alastair Martin Adamson.
