= Myrsine ronuiensis =

Conservation status
- Data Deficient (IUCN 3.1)

Scientific classification
- Kingdom: Plantae
- Clade: Embryophytes
- Clade: Tracheophytes
- Clade: Angiosperms
- Clade: Eudicots
- Clade: Asterids
- Order: Ericales
- Family: Primulaceae
- Genus: Myrsine
- Species: M. ronuiensis

Binomial name
- Myrsine ronuiensis (M.L.Grant) Fosberg & Sachet (1975)

Synonyms
- Rapanea ronuiensis M.L.Grant (1974)

Species of flowering plant

Myrsine ronuiensis is a species of flowering plant in the family Primulaceae. It is a tree endemic to the Society Islands of French Polynesia.
