= Myrsine fusca =

Conservation status
- Near Threatened (IUCN 3.1)

Scientific classification
- Kingdom: Plantae
- Clade: Embryophytes
- Clade: Tracheophytes
- Clade: Angiosperms
- Clade: Eudicots
- Clade: Asterids
- Order: Ericales
- Family: Primulaceae
- Genus: Myrsine
- Species: M. fusca

Binomial name
- Myrsine fusca (J.W.Moore) Fosberg & Sachet (1975)

Synonyms
- Rapanea fusca J.W.Moore (1933)

Species of flowering plant

Myrsine fusca is a species of plant in the family Primulaceae. It is a tree endemic to French Polynesia, where it is native to the Tubuai Islands and the island of Raiatea in the Society Islands.
