= Myrsine falcata =

Conservation status
- Data Deficient (IUCN 3.1)

Scientific classification
- Kingdom: Plantae
- Clade: Embryophytes
- Clade: Tracheophytes
- Clade: Angiosperms
- Clade: Eudicots
- Clade: Asterids
- Order: Ericales
- Family: Primulaceae
- Genus: Myrsine
- Species: M. falcata

Binomial name
- Myrsine falcata Nadeaud

Species of flowering plant

Myrsine falcata is a species of plant in the family Primulaceae. It is endemic to Tahiti.
