= Abutilon sachetianum =

Conservation status
- Critically Endangered (IUCN 3.1)

Scientific classification
- Kingdom: Plantae
- Clade: Tracheophytes
- Clade: Angiosperms
- Clade: Eudicots
- Clade: Rosids
- Order: Malvales
- Family: Malvaceae
- Genus: Abutilon
- Species: A. sachetianum

Binomial name
- Abutilon sachetianum Fosberg

Species of flowering plant

Abutilon sachetianum is a small tree only known from the Marquesas. The species is found in small subpopulations on the islands of Eiao, Hatutaa, Hiva Oa, Mohotani and Nuku Hiva.

It is named in honor of the botanist Marie-Hélène Sachet.
