= Myrsine brownii =

Conservation status
- Endangered (IUCN 3.1)

Scientific classification
- Kingdom: Plantae
- Clade: Tracheophytes
- Clade: Angiosperms
- Clade: Eudicots
- Clade: Asterids
- Order: Ericales
- Family: Primulaceae
- Genus: Myrsine
- Species: M. brownii

Binomial name
- Myrsine brownii Fosberg & Sachet (1975)

Species of flowering plant

Myrsine brownii is a species of plant in the family Primulaceae. It is a tree endemic to the Tubuai Islands of French Polynesia.
