= Myrsine hartii =

Conservation status
- Endangered (IUCN 3.1)

Scientific classification
- Kingdom: Plantae
- Clade: Tracheophytes
- Clade: Angiosperms
- Clade: Eudicots
- Clade: Asterids
- Order: Ericales
- Family: Primulaceae
- Genus: Myrsine
- Species: M. hartii

Binomial name
- Myrsine hartii (M.L.Grant) Fosberg & Sachet (1975)

Synonyms
- Rapanea hartii M.L.Grant (1974)

Species of flowering plant

Myrsine hartii is a species of plant in the family Primulaceae. It is endemic to the Society Islands of French Polynesia.
