= Myrsine rapensis =

Conservation status
- Least Concern (IUCN 2.3)

Scientific classification
- Kingdom: Plantae
- Clade: Tracheophytes
- Clade: Angiosperms
- Clade: Eudicots
- Clade: Asterids
- Order: Ericales
- Family: Primulaceae
- Genus: Myrsine
- Species: M. rapensis

Binomial name
- Myrsine rapensis (F. Brown) Fosberg & Sachet (1975)

Synonyms
- Rapanea myricifolia f. rapensis F.Br. (1935)

Species of flowering plant

Myrsine rapensis is a species of plant in the family Primulaceae. It is a tree endemic to the island of Rapa Iti in the Tubuai Islands of French Polynesia.
