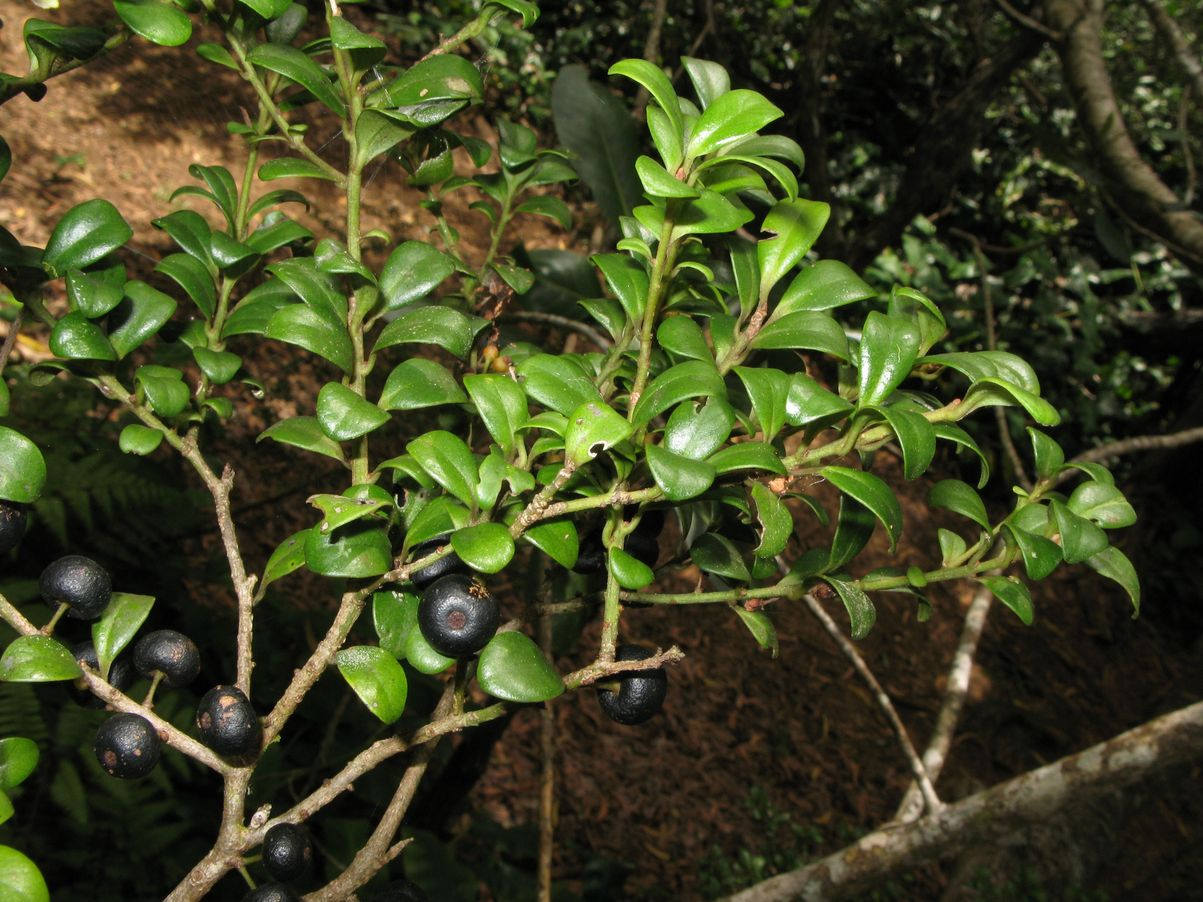
- Myrsine alyxifolia

Scientific classification
- Kingdom: Plantae
- Clade: Tracheophytes
- Clade: Angiosperms
- Clade: Eudicots
- Clade: Asterids
- Order: Ericales
- Family: Primulaceae
- Subfamily: Myrsinoideae
- Genus: Myrsine; L.

Species
- 283 – see List of Myrsine species

Synonyms
- Anamtia Koidz. (1923); Athruphyllum Lour. (1790); Caballeria Ruiz & Pav. (1794); Duhamelia Dombey ex Lam. (1783); Fialaris Raf. (1838); Heurlinia Raf. (1838); Hunsteinia Lauterb. (1918); Manglilla Juss. (1789); Merista Banks & Sol. ex A.Cunn. (1839); Pilogyne Gagnep. (1948), nom. illeg.; Plotia Adans. in Fam. Pl. 2: 226 (1763); Rapanea Aubl. in Hist. Pl. Guiane: 121 (1775); Scleroxylum Willd. (1809); Suttonia A.Rich. (1832)

= Myrsine =

Genus of flowering plants

Myrsine is a genus of flowering plants in the family Primulaceae. It was formerly placed in the family Myrsinaceae before this was merged into the Primulaceae. It is found nearly worldwide, primarily in tropical and subtropical areas. It contains over 280 species, including several notable radiations, such as the matipo of New Zealand and the kōlea of Hawaiʻi (the New Zealand "black matipo", Pittosporum tenuifolium, is not related to Myrsine). In the United States, members of this genus are known as colicwood. Some species, especially M. africana, are grown as ornamental shrubs.

The leathery, evergreen leaves are simple and alternate, with smooth or toothed margins and without stipules. The one-seeded, indehiscent fruit is a thin-fleshed globose drupe. The flowers and fruits often do not develop until after leaf fall and thus appear naked on the branches. The fruits often do not mature until the year after flowering. The calyx is persistent.

The Pacific basin and New World species formerly separated in the genera Rapanea and Suttonia (distinguished from the African and Southeast Asian Myrsine sensu stricto by having the style absent and staminal tube and filaments completely adnate to the corolla) are now generally included in Myrsine.

== Selected species ==
- Myrsine adamsonii Fosberg & Sachet (French Polynesia)
- Myrsine africana L. (Africa, Southern Asia and the Azores)
- Myrsine andersonii Fosbert & Sachet (French Polynesia)
- Myrsine australis – Red matipo, mapou (New Zealand)
- Myrsine brownii Fosbert & Sachet (French Polynesia)
- Myrsine bullata Pipoly (Peru)
- Myrsine ceylanica (Mez) Wadhwa (Sri Lanka)
- Myrsine cheesemanii (Mez) Hemsl. ex Prain (Cook Islands)
- Myrsine collina Nadeaud (Society Islands)
- Myrsine degeneri Hosaka (Oʻahu in Hawaiʻi)
- Myrsine diazii Pipoly (Peru)
- Myrsine divaricata Cunn (New Zealand)
- Myrsine falcata Nadeaud (French Polynesia)
- Myrsine fasciculata (J.Moore) Fosberg & Sachet (French Polynesia)
- Myrsine fernseei (Mez) Hosaka (Kauaʻi in Hawaiʻi)
- Myrsine fosbergii Hosaka (Oʻahu and Kauaʻi in Hawaiʻi)
- Myrsine fusca (J.Moore) Fosberg & Sachet (French Polynesia)
- Myrsine gracilissima Fosberg & Sachet (French Polynesia)
- Myrsine hartii (M.L.Grant) Fosberg & Sachet (Society Islands)
- Myrsine hosakae H.St.John (Pitcairn Islands)
- Myrsine howittiana (F.Muell. ex Mez) Jackes (Eastern Australia)
- Myrsine juddii Hosaka
- Myrsine juergensenii (Mez) Ricketson & Pipoly (Mexico and Central America)
- Myrsine kermadecensis Cheeseman (Kermadec Islands)
- Myrsine knudsenii (Rock) Hosaka (Kauaʻi in Hawaiʻi)
- Myrsine lessertiana A.DC. – Kōlea lau nui (Hawaiʻi)
- Myrsine linearifolia Hosaka
- Myrsine longifolia Nadeaud (Tahiti)
- Myrsine mccomishii (Sprague) Jackes (Lord Howe Island)
- Myrsine melanophloeos (L.) R.Br. ex Sweet (sub-Saharan Africa)
- Myrsine mezii Hosaka (Kauaʻi in Hawaiʻi)
- Myrsine myrtillina (Mez) Jackes (Lord Howe Island)
- Myrsine niauensis Fosberg & Sachet (French Polynesia)
- Myrsine nukuhivensis Fosberg & Sachet (French Polynesia)
- Myrsine obovata (J.Moore) Fosberg & Sachet (French Polynesia)
- Myrsine oliveri Allan (New Zealand)
- Myrsine orohenensis (J.Moore) Fosberg & Sachet (French Polynesia)
- Myrsine pearcei (Mez) Pipoly (Peru)
- Myrsine perakensis King & Gamble (Peninsular Malaysia)
- Myrsine petiolata Hosaka (Kauaʻi in Hawaiʻi)
- Myrsine platystigma F.Muell. (Lord Howe Island)
- Myrsine raiateensis (J.Moore) Fosberg & Sachet (French Polynesia)
- Myrsine rapensis (F.Brown) Fosberg & Sachet (French Polynesia)
- Myrsine reynelii Pipoly (Peru)
- Myrsine richmondensis Jackes (Australia)
- Myrsine rivularis (Mez) Pipoly (Peru)
- Myrsine ronuiensis (M.Grant) Fosberg & Sachet (French Polynesia)
- Myrsine salicina (Hook.f.) Heward ex Hook.f. (New Zealand)
- Myrsine seychellarum (Mez) Ricketson & Pipoly (Seychelles)
- Myrsine sodiroana (Mez) Pipoly (Ecuador)
- Myrsine striata (Mez) Ricketson & Pipoly (southwestern India)
- Myrsine tahuatensis Fosbert & Sachet (French Polynesia)
- Myrsine variabilis R.Br. (eastern Australia)
