= Myrsine nukuhivensis =

Conservation status
- Least Concern (IUCN 2.3)

Scientific classification
- Kingdom: Plantae
- Clade: Tracheophytes
- Clade: Angiosperms
- Clade: Eudicots
- Clade: Asterids
- Order: Ericales
- Family: Primulaceae
- Genus: Myrsine
- Species: M. nukuhivensis

Binomial name
- Myrsine nukuhivensis Fosberg & Sachet (1975)

Species of flowering plant

Myrsine nukuhivensis is a species of plant in the family Primulaceae. It is a shrub or tre endemic to the island of Nuku Hiva in the Marquesas Islands of French Polynesia.
