= Myrsine raiateensis =

Conservation status
- Data Deficient (IUCN 3.1)

Scientific classification
- Kingdom: Plantae
- Clade: Embryophytes
- Clade: Tracheophytes
- Clade: Angiosperms
- Clade: Eudicots
- Clade: Asterids
- Order: Ericales
- Family: Primulaceae
- Genus: Myrsine
- Species: M. raiateensis

Binomial name
- Myrsine raiateensis (J.W.Moore) Fosberg & Sachet (1975)

Synonyms
- Rapanea raiateensis J.W.Moore (1963)

Species of flowering plant

Myrsine raiateensis is a species of flowering plant in the family Primulaceae. It is a tree endemic to the island of Raiatea in the Society Islands of French Polynesia.
