= Myrsine orohenensis =

Conservation status
- Data Deficient (IUCN 3.1)

Scientific classification
- Kingdom: Plantae
- Clade: Embryophytes
- Clade: Tracheophytes
- Clade: Angiosperms
- Clade: Eudicots
- Clade: Asterids
- Order: Ericales
- Family: Primulaceae
- Genus: Myrsine
- Species: M. orohenensis

Binomial name
- Myrsine orohenensis (J.W.Moore) Fosberg & Sachet (1975)

Synonyms
- Myrsine st-johnii Fosberg & Sachet (1975), nom. illeg.; Rapanea orohenensis J.W.Moore (1940); Rapanea st-johnii M.L.Grant (1974), nom. illeg.

Species of flowering plant

Myrsine orohenensis is a species of flowering plant in the family Primulaceae. It is endemic to the island of Tahiti in the Society Islands of French Polynesia.
