= Myrsine fasciculata =

Conservation status
- Near Threatened (IUCN 3.1)

Scientific classification
- Kingdom: Plantae
- Clade: Embryophytes
- Clade: Tracheophytes
- Clade: Angiosperms
- Clade: Eudicots
- Clade: Asterids
- Order: Ericales
- Family: Primulaceae
- Genus: Myrsine
- Species: M. fasciculata

Binomial name
- Myrsine fasciculata (J.W.Moore) Fosberg & Sachet (1975)

Synonyms
- Myrsine fusca var. fasciculata (J.W.Moore) S.L.Welsh (1998); Rapanea fasciculata J.W.Moore (1933); Rapanea fusca var. fasciculata (J.W.Moore) M.L.Grant (1974); Rapanea viridis J.W.Moore (1933)

Species of flowering plant

Myrsine fasciculata is a species of plant in the family Primulaceae. It is a shrub or small tree endemic to the island of Raiatea in the Society Islands of French Polynesia. It grows in high-elevation tropical shrubland.
