= Myrsine niauensis =

Conservation status
- Least Concern (IUCN 2.3)

Scientific classification
- Kingdom: Plantae
- Clade: Tracheophytes
- Clade: Angiosperms
- Clade: Eudicots
- Clade: Asterids
- Order: Ericales
- Family: Primulaceae
- Genus: Myrsine
- Species: M. niauensis

Binomial name
- Myrsine niauensis Fosberg & Sachet

Species of flowering plant

Myrsine niauensis is a species of plant in the family Primulaceae. It is endemic to the island of Niau in the Tuamotu Archipelago of French Polynesia.
