= Myrsine longifolia =

Conservation status
- Endangered (IUCN 3.1)

Scientific classification
- Kingdom: Plantae
- Clade: Embryophytes
- Clade: Tracheophytes
- Clade: Angiosperms
- Clade: Eudicots
- Clade: Asterids
- Order: Ericales
- Family: Primulaceae
- Genus: Myrsine
- Species: M. longifolia

Binomial name
- Myrsine longifolia Nadeaud (1873)

Synonyms
- Myrsine taitensis var. longifolia (Nadeaud) Drake (1892); Rapanea longifolia (Nadeaud) Mez (1902)

Species of plant

Myrsine longifolia is a species of flowering plant in the family Primulaceae. It is a shrub or small tree endemic to the island of Tahiti in the Society Islands of French Polynesia. It grows in lowland tropical moist forest.
