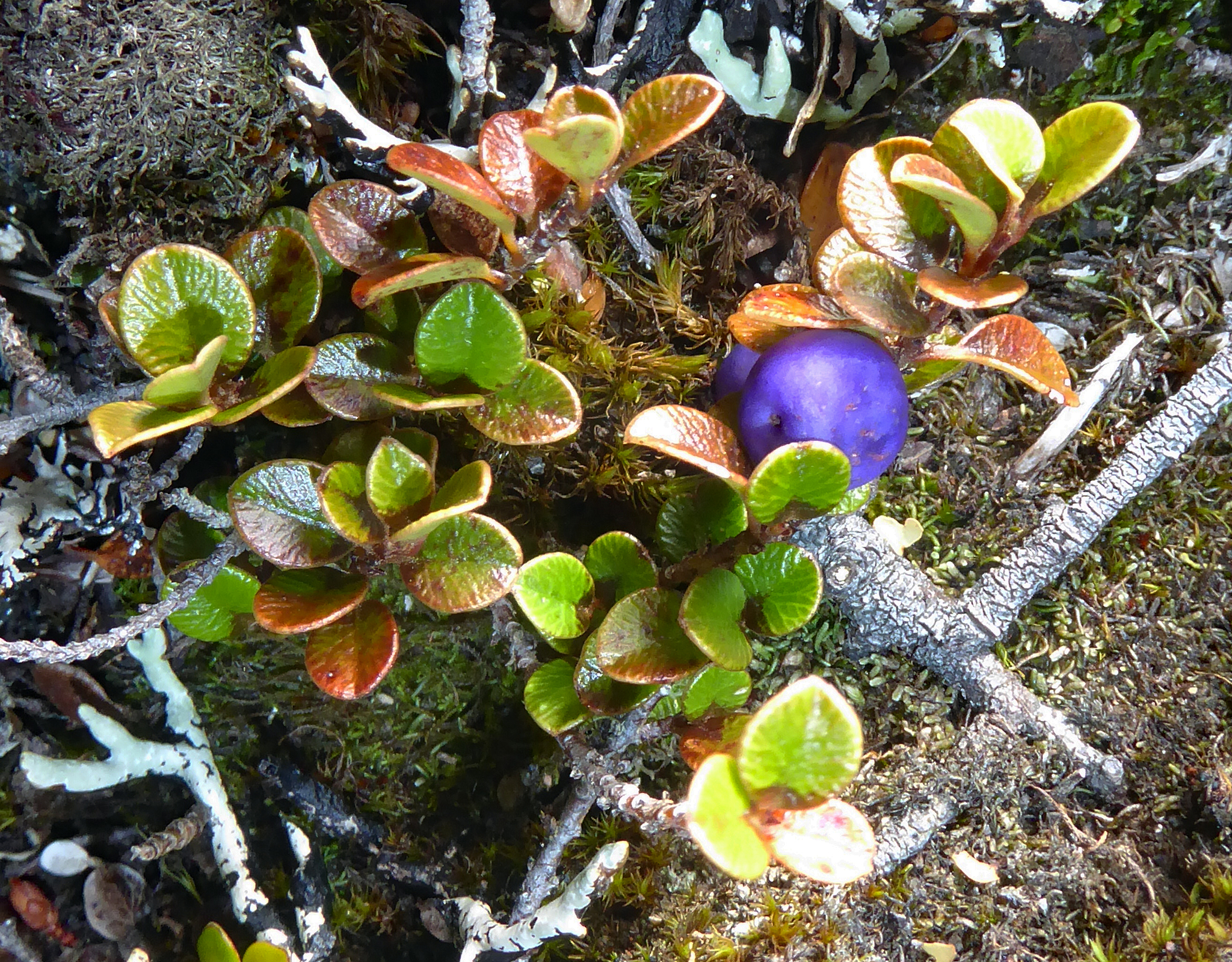
- Myrsine nummularia near Ohakune

Conservation status
- Not Threatened (NZ TCS)

Scientific classification
- Kingdom: Plantae
- Clade: Tracheophytes
- Clade: Angiosperms
- Clade: Eudicots
- Clade: Asterids
- Order: Ericales
- Family: Primulaceae
- Genus: Myrsine
- Species: M. nummularia

Binomial name
- Myrsine nummularia (Hook.f.) Hook.f.

= Myrsine nummularia =

Species of plant

Myrsine nummularia, the creeping mapou or creeping matipo, is a species of flowering plant, endemic to New Zealand. It is a low shrub that has purplish berries.

== Description ==
This species is a low shrub with thick brown or green leaves. The bark is red or brown. The fruit are purplish, and are present from October to February. The berries are semi-ramiflorous, in that they sprout from the stem, beneath some leaves.

== Range ==
This species is found on both the North and South Island. For instance, it is found on the Banks Peninsula, and in the central North Island.
