= Myrsine juddii =

Conservation status
- Critically Imperiled (NatureServe)

Scientific classification
- Kingdom: Plantae
- Clade: Tracheophytes
- Clade: Angiosperms
- Clade: Eudicots
- Clade: Asterids
- Order: Ericales
- Family: Primulaceae
- Genus: Myrsine
- Species: M. juddii

Binomial name
- Myrsine juddii Hosaka

Species of flowering plant

Myrsine juddii is a rare species of flowering plant in the primrose family known by the common name cloudswept colicwood. It is endemic to Hawaii, where it is known only from the Koolau Mountains of Oahu. There is a single population made up of about 3000 individuals. Like other Hawaiian Myrsine this plant is called kōlea. It is a federally listed endangered species of the United States.

This is a shrub with a branching stem reaching 1 to 2 meters tall. Flowers occur in clusters along the branches. It grows in wet forests on mountain ridges in the cloud zone.

The plant is threatened by the loss and degradation of its habitat, mainly due to the presence of feral pigs and non-native plants. Some of the plant's habitat is on military territory and it may be threatened by military activity.
