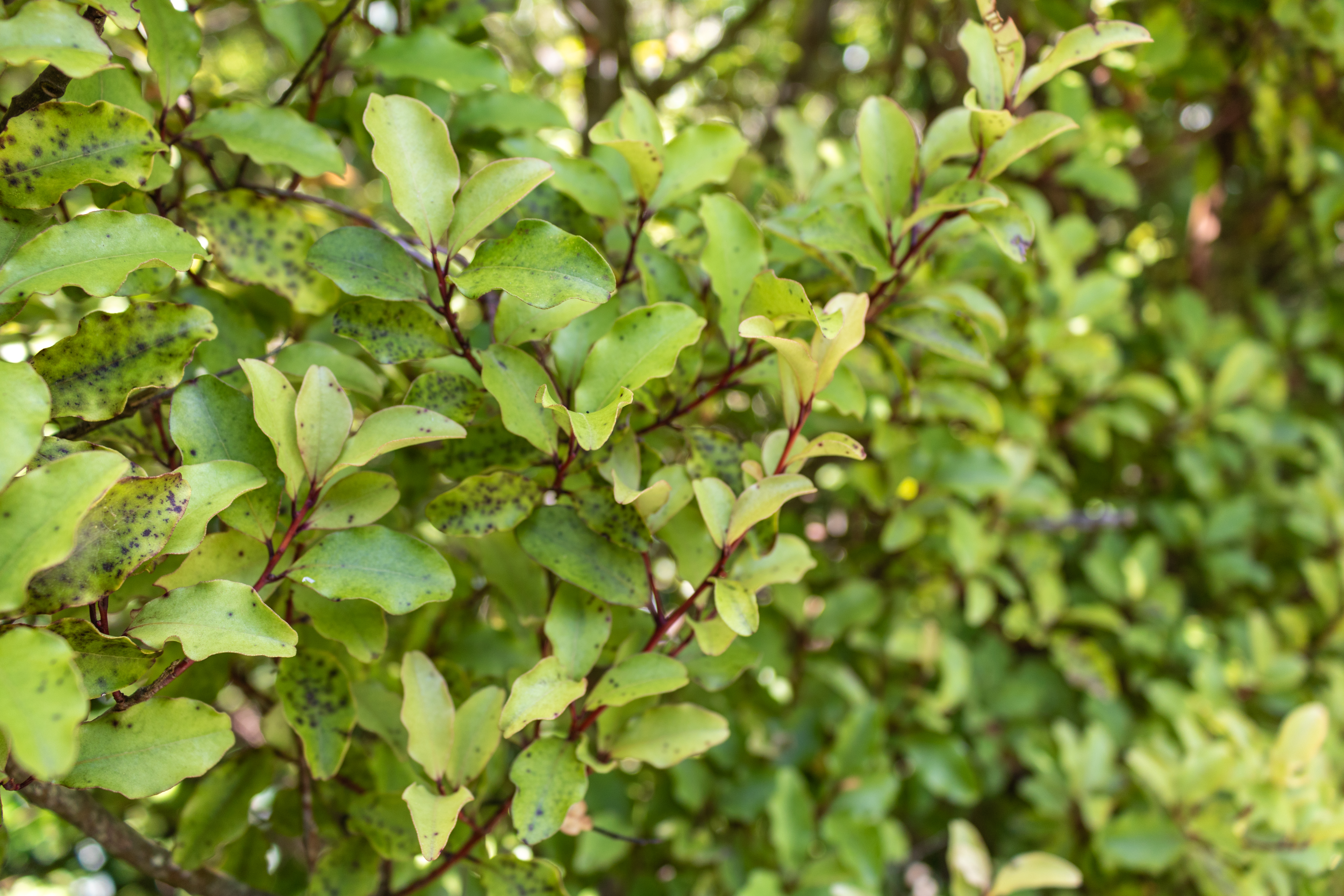
- Myrsine australis foliage

Conservation status
- Not Threatened (NZ TCS)

Scientific classification
- Kingdom: Plantae
- Clade: Tracheophytes
- Clade: Angiosperms
- Clade: Eudicots
- Clade: Asterids
- Order: Ericales
- Family: Primulaceae
- Genus: Myrsine
- Species: M. australis

Binomial name
- Myrsine australis (A.Rich 1947)

= Myrsine australis =

Species of shrub endemic to New Zealand

Myrsine australis, commonly known as māpou, red matipo, tīpau, and mataira is a species of shrub within the family Myrsinaceae. It is endemic to New Zealand, found throughout both the mainland and offshore islands.

== Description ==
Myrsine australis is a small shrub or tree, growing from 3–6 metres tall with short upright branches that create a compact crown. The trunk grows up to 20 cm in diameter, with the bark of the trunk and older branches a dark brown/black, whereas the juvenile branches are reddish, a distinguishing feature of this plant. The leaves are coloured pale green with a yellow tinge on the top surface, while the underside of the leaf is a paler version of this. Measuring 3–6 cm in length to 1.52.5 cm in width, the leaves are arranged alternatively on the stem and have a leathery texture. The leaf margins are normally wavy, however some uncommon forms may also have flat leaf margins. Each leaf blade is typically covered in round, translucent glands, and is connected to a red, approximately 5mm long, leaf stalk. These leaf stalks, also called petioles, can vary in colour and size as a result of environmental conditions and local population trends.

== Distribution ==
=== Natural global range ===
Red matipo is a species native to the North, South and Stewart Islands of New Zealand, though its representative abundance is higher in Northern New Zealand Along with four other Myrsine species native to the North, South and Stewart Islands, there are four further Myrsine species native only to outlying islands separate from the New Zealand mainland; the Chatham Islands, the Three Kings Islands, and the Kermadec Islands. Outside of New Zealand, there are a further 300 Myrsine species found throughout the world.

=== New Zealand range ===
Red matipo is found naturally throughout the North, South and Stewart Islands. It would have once been common throughout all of lowland New Zealand, which was largely composed of podocarp/broadleaf species, however with clearance for purposes such as timber milling and agriculture, the amount remaining is vastly smaller than what it was. The species is now, however, commonly found within revegetation and riparian planting areas throughout the country, and has been taken up by gardeners that are fond of its aesthetic appeal and its useful properties as a hedge plant. Pine plantations in New Zealand take up a vast area of land, often on steep, erosion prone surfaces, and red matipo is one of a number of New Zealand native plants that commonly persists beneath the canopy of pine trees.

=== Habitat preferences ===
Red matipo is found from sea level to 900m in elevation, preferring forest margins, scrubland and coastal forest, and more rarely, as a part of the understory within mature inland forest. found red matipo to be an early coloniser when previous land uses such as agriculture are abandoned and natural regeneration occurs (provided there is an available seed source), and as a result, it is known as a hardy species that is commonly used in planted revegetation sites to provide initial cover for the establishment of longer lived, less durable plants. Due to red matipo’s wide ecological and geographical distribution, it lives alongside a varying composition of plants, ranging from species such as pōhutukawa, ngaio and titoki on the coast, mānuka and kānuka in scrub land, podocarps in mature forest, and also in amongst lower altitude beech forests. This species is therefore common, and is not considered to be threatened or at any risk of extinction.

== Life cycle and phenology ==
On average, Myrsine australis tends to flower between August and January, and produces fruit between September and December. Its flowers are clustered on small stalks on the branchlets where older leaves have already been lost. They are small and inconspicuous (like most other New Zealand native flowers), measuring from 1.5mm to 2.5mm in diameter, and are a cream to whitish colour, covered in small orange glands. The flowers are unisexual, therefore some individuals produce only male flowers for pollen distribution, and other individuals produce only female flowers for fertilization and fruit growth. The petals of the flowers are lanceolate, obtuse, free and revolute. Due to the occurrence of flowering and fruiting periods overlapping, some specimens can display both fruit and flowers at the same time. Red matipo’s fruits are drupes; a single seed is encased in a hard core, which is then covered in a fleshy outer layer. The fruits measure 2-4mm in diameter, are coloured dark brown to black, and are commonly dispersed by kererū, tūī, tauhou, korimako, and blackbird, who eat the fruit, and dispose of the seed once digested. The plant has the ability to retain a ‘Seed Bank’, with some seeds remaining dormant for a year or more and germinating at random intervals and amounts. Seeds typically require a chilling period to enable germination to occur, and it is also suspected that after seed fall, embryos may still be developing. Therefore, germination can take nearly four to five times as long in comparison to other New Zealand natives such as Hoheria angustifolia and Coprosma foetidissima which typically germinate far more rapidly. These time periods are rough averages as each specimen of Myrsine australis has its own natural variety and irregular pattern.

== Diet, prey and predators ==
=== Diet and foraging ===
Red matipo is a fast growing, early colonizing species, yet can also survive within dense forest understorey, and so it is therefore tolerant of varying environmental conditions, such as light. As it is found throughout the North, South and Stewart Islands, its climatic tolerance is also high, and once established can live within drought prone, and also frost prone, conditions. Red matipo grows well on most soil types. showed that on average, a high level of phosphorus in the soil is beneficial to red matipo’s growth, however it consistently persists at low phosphorus levels, and is altered little in comparison to other New Zealand native plants.

=== Predators, parasites, and diseases ===
With the introduction of wild grazing mammals such as deer and goats to New Zealands native forests, there has been a widespread loss in the abundance and diversity of its understory flora, red matipo just one example of a large array of species. Much like red matipo’s other attributes, it is considered a persistent species in comparison to other native plants when under the pressure of grazing mammals. Through research carried out by, when domesticated sheep and cattle were released into forest fragments with a high understorey flora species composition, red matipo was one of the plant species least effected, whether it be by grazing or trampling of the animals. Similar results were found by, where the effects of wild grazing mammals were analysed. The Australian common brushtail possum, an invasive selective browser, also has a tendency to avoid red matipo foliage, and that in a study of fruit seeds and flowers of the brushtail possum diet in New Zealand, seeds of red matipo were only found occasionally in possum faeces. Avian fauna consume the fruit of red matipo, particularly native birds such as the New Zealand bellbird and tūī, but also introduced species such as the common blackbird. These birds provide a vital role for red matipo by dispersing its seed in the process.

There are many types of insects, from moths to beetles to sucking thrips to nondescript gall midges, that affect māpou.

== Other information ==
The genus Myrsine was first described by Linnaeus for Myrsine africana, a species with a broad native range in Africa, India and China. This genus was originally split into three separate genera, Myrsine, Suttonia, and Rapanea, however due to a lack adequate characters to separate them, the around 300 species are now all combined under the one genus Myrsine. Red matipo is a species that is often confused with another native New Zealand plant species, Pittosporum tenuifolium, common name Kōhūhū. Although these two species are evolutionarily distinct, this confusion normally occurs when only the leaves are used for identification, as the bark of the young branches is distinctly red on red matipo, and black on Kōhūhū. Both Maori and early Europeans utilised red matipo for its medicinal value, as its leaves, when boiled in water, provide a cure to toothache. Scientific analysis of red matipo leaves today show it contains glucorinic acid, an arthritis treatment, and rutin, a treatment for blood vessel problems. Many of the other Myrsine species are still today utilized for medicinal purposes, a particularly interesting example of this being M.africana, as it contains a substance called saponin which provides benefit to cancer patients. Europeans also used red matipo wood for cabinet making when the milling of native forest was standard practice, however today, due to its hardy nature and appealing looks, it is more commonly used as a hedge plant. Through plant breeding, horticulturalists have developed an even more visually appealing, variegated form. Here, the centre of the leaf is bright green/yellow, and is surrounded by a thin, inconsistent margin where the normal leaf colour is kept.
