= Myrsine mezii =

Conservation status
- Critically Endangered (IUCN 3.1)

Scientific classification
- Kingdom: Plantae
- Clade: Tracheophytes
- Clade: Angiosperms
- Clade: Eudicots
- Clade: Asterids
- Order: Ericales
- Family: Primulaceae
- Genus: Myrsine
- Species: M. mezii

Binomial name
- Myrsine mezii Hosaka

Species of tree

Myrsine mezii, the Hanapepe River colicwood, is a species of tree in the primrose family. It is endemic to the island of Kauai in Hawaii. It is threatened by habitat loss. It is a federally listed endangered species of the United States.

There are two remaining populations of this tree for a total of just five individuals. One of the populations is made up of a single tree which is in poor condition.
