= Myrsine fernseei =

Conservation status
- Endangered (IUCN 3.1)

Scientific classification
- Kingdom: Plantae
- Clade: Embryophytes
- Clade: Tracheophytes
- Clade: Angiosperms
- Clade: Eudicots
- Clade: Asterids
- Order: Ericales
- Family: Primulaceae
- Genus: Myrsine
- Species: M. fernseei

Binomial name
- Myrsine fernseei (Mez) Hosaka

Synonyms
- Homotypic Synonyms: Rapanea fernseei (Mez) O.Deg. & Hosaka; Suttonia fernseei Mez; Heterotypic Synonyms: Myrsine gaudichaudii var. grandifolia Wawra

Species of tree

Myrsine fernseei is a species of flowering plant in the family Primulaceae. It is sometimes referred to by the common names Kolea or streambank colicwood. It is a tree endemic to the Hawaiian Islands. It is threatened by habitat loss.

The species was first described as Suttonia fernseei by Carl Christian Mez in 1902. In 1940 Edward Yataro Hosaka placed the species in genus Myrsine as M. fernseei.
