= Myrsine rivularis =

Conservation status
- Data Deficient (IUCN 3.1)

Scientific classification
- Kingdom: Plantae
- Clade: Tracheophytes
- Clade: Angiosperms
- Clade: Eudicots
- Clade: Asterids
- Order: Ericales
- Family: Primulaceae
- Genus: Myrsine
- Species: M. rivularis

Binomial name
- Myrsine rivularis (Mez) Pipoly

Synonyms
- Homotypic Synonyms: Rapanea rivularis Mez

Species of plant

Myrsine rivularis is a species of flowering plant in the family Primulaceae. It is endemic to Peru.
