= Myrsine petiolata =

Conservation status
- Critically Endangered (IUCN 3.1)

Scientific classification
- Kingdom: Plantae
- Clade: Tracheophytes
- Clade: Angiosperms
- Clade: Eudicots
- Clade: Asterids
- Order: Ericales
- Family: Primulaceae
- Genus: Myrsine
- Species: M. petiolata

Binomial name
- Myrsine petiolata Hosaka

Species of tree

Myrsine petiolata, the swamp colicwood, is a species of plant in the family Primulaceae. It is endemic to the island of Kauai in Hawaii. It is threatened by habitat loss.
