= Myrsine knudsenii =

Conservation status
- Critically Endangered (IUCN 3.1)

Scientific classification
- Kingdom: Plantae
- Clade: Tracheophytes
- Clade: Angiosperms
- Clade: Eudicots
- Clade: Asterids
- Order: Ericales
- Family: Primulaceae
- Genus: Myrsine
- Species: M. knudsenii

Binomial name
- Myrsine knudsenii (Rock) Hosaka

Species of tree

Myrsine knudsenii, the Kokee colicwood, is a species of tree in the primrose family. It is endemic to the island of Kauai in Hawaii. It is threatened by habitat loss.

This is a shrub or tree growing up to 4.5 meters tall with flowers occurring in clusters along the branches. It grows in moist forests dominated by Acacia koa, Metrosideros polymorpha, and Dicranopteris linearis. It probably once occurred in several other types of ecosystem.

There are three populations left, for a total of about 30 trees. It was federally listed as an endangered species of the United States in 2010.
