= Myrsine pearcei =

Conservation status
- Vulnerable (IUCN 2.3)

Scientific classification
- Kingdom: Plantae
- Clade: Embryophytes
- Clade: Tracheophytes
- Clade: Angiosperms
- Clade: Eudicots
- Clade: Asterids
- Order: Ericales
- Family: Primulaceae
- Genus: Myrsine
- Species: M. pearcei

Binomial name
- Myrsine pearcei (Mez) Pipoly

Synonyms
- Homotypic Synonyms: Rapanea pearcei Mez; Heterotypic Synonyms: Rapanea denticulata Rusby

Species of plant

Myrsine pearcei is a species of flowering plant in the family Primulaceae. It is native to Bolivia, Ecuador, and Peru.
