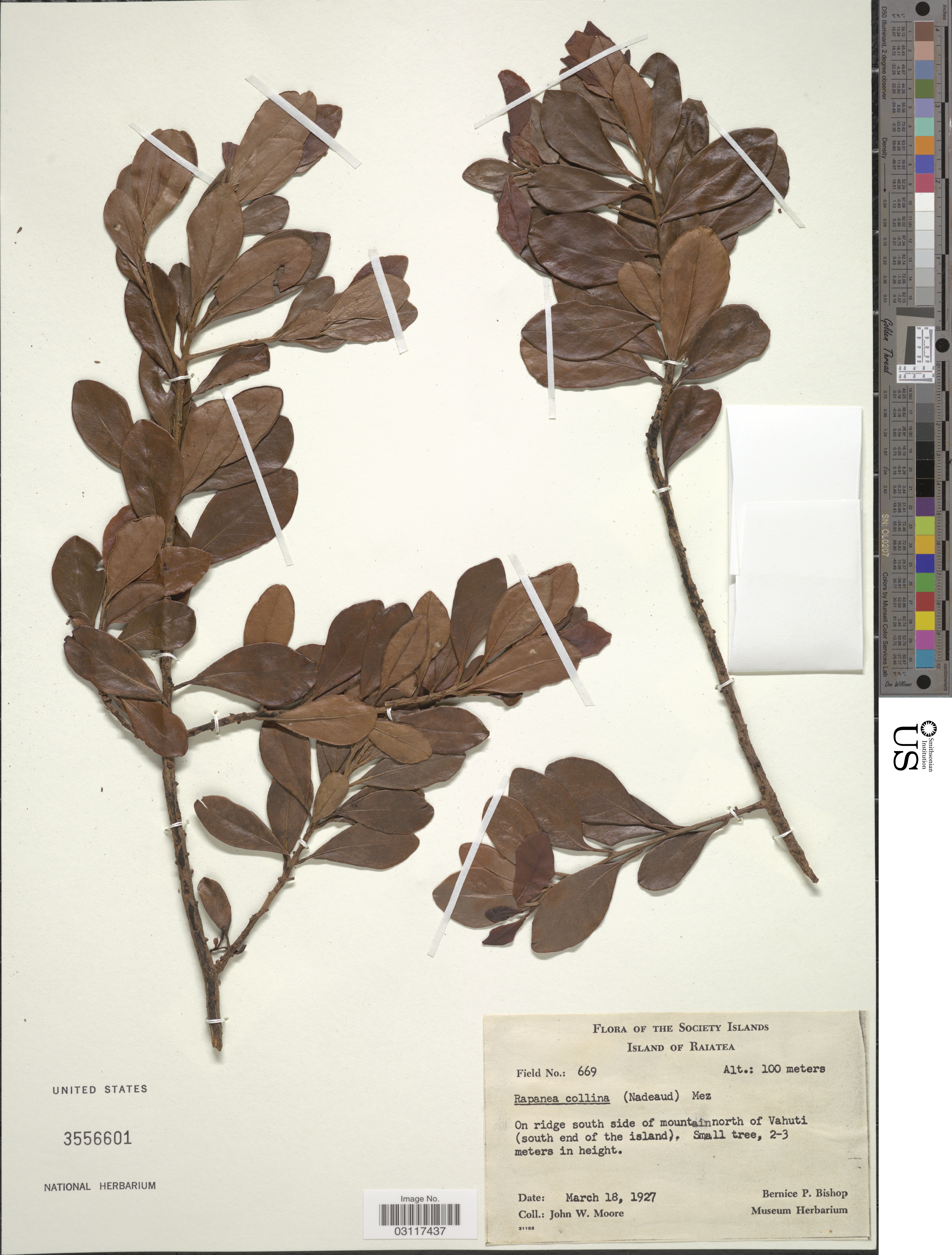
- A Myrsine Collina leaf press

Conservation status
- Data Deficient (IUCN 3.1)

Scientific classification
- Kingdom: Plantae
- Clade: Embryophytes
- Clade: Tracheophytes
- Clade: Angiosperms
- Clade: Eudicots
- Clade: Asterids
- Order: Ericales
- Family: Primulaceae
- Genus: Myrsine
- Species: M. collina

Binomial name
- Myrsine collina Nadeaud

Synonyms
- Rapanea collina (Nadeaud) Mez

= Myrsine collina =

Species of plant

Myrsine collina, synonym Rapanea collina, is a species of flowering plant in the family Primulaceae. It is endemic to the Society Islands. It is a shrub or small tree which grows in lowland and montane tropical moist forests.
