= Myrsine fosbergii =

Conservation status
- Critically Endangered (IUCN 3.1)

Scientific classification
- Kingdom: Plantae
- Clade: Tracheophytes
- Clade: Angiosperms
- Clade: Eudicots
- Clade: Asterids
- Order: Ericales
- Family: Primulaceae
- Genus: Myrsine
- Species: M. fosbergii

Binomial name
- Myrsine fosbergii Hosaka

Synonyms
- Rapanea forbesii Mez

Species of tree

Myrsine fosbergii, the Koolau Range colicwood, is a species of plant in the family Primulaceae. It is endemic to the Hawaiian Islands. It is threatened by habitat loss.
