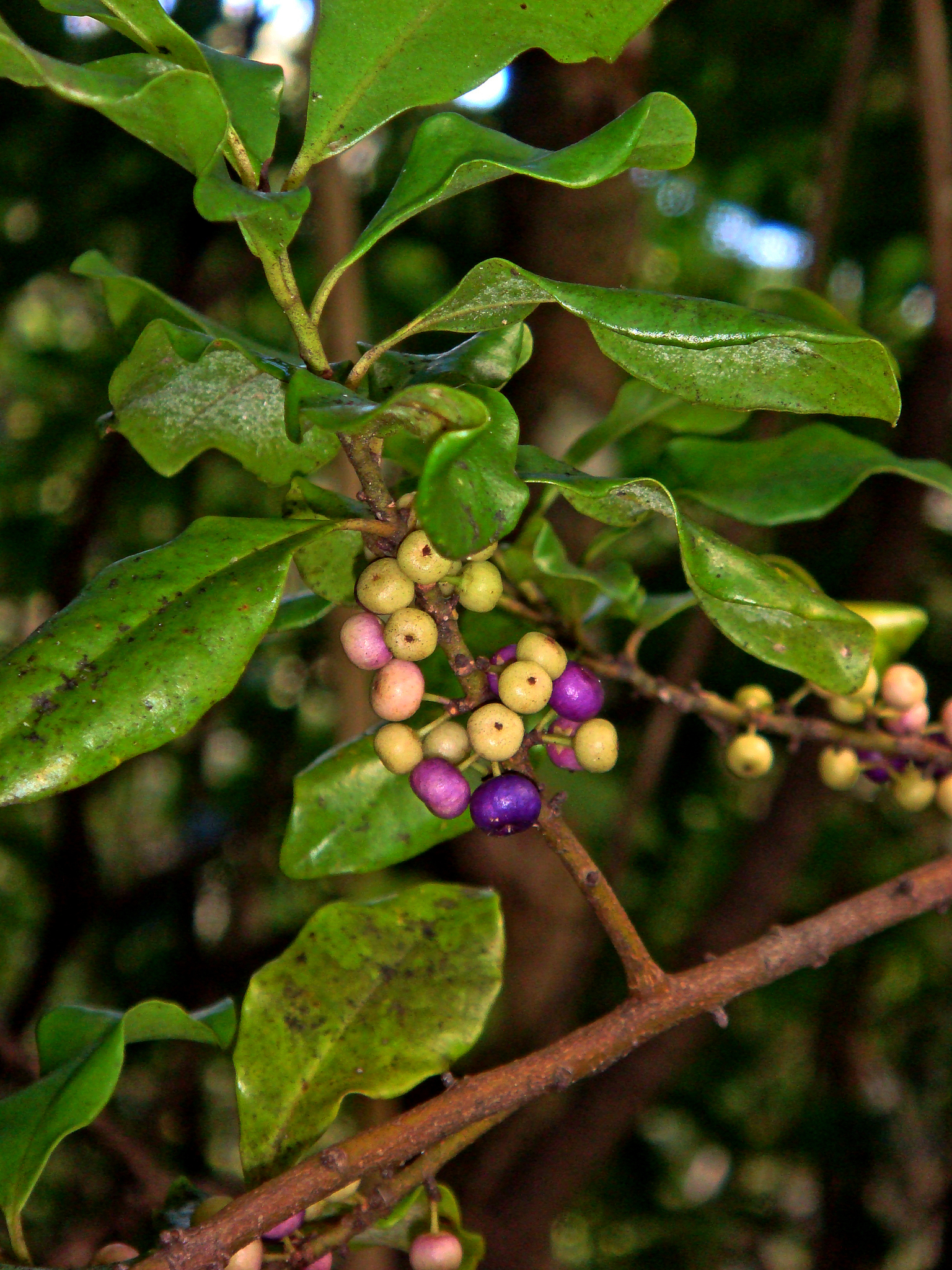

Scientific classification
- Kingdom: Plantae
- Clade: Tracheophytes
- Clade: Angiosperms
- Clade: Eudicots
- Clade: Asterids
- Order: Ericales
- Family: Primulaceae
- Genus: Myrsine
- Species: M. kermadecensis

Binomial name
- Myrsine kermadecensis Cheeseman, 1892

Synonyms
- Rapanea kermadecensis (Cheeseman) Mez; Suttonia kermadecensis (Cheeseman) Cheeseman

= Myrsine kermadecensis =

Species of flowering plant

Myrsine kermadecensis, commonly known as the Kermadec matipo, Kermadec myrsine, or the Kermadec mapou, is a species of flowering plant in the family Primulaceae, endemic to the Kermadec Islands of New Zealand. It was named by Thomas Cheeseman in 1888, and first described in 1892.

== Taxonomy ==
Cheeseman named the species in his 1888 article On the flora of the Kermadec Islands; with Notes on the Fauna, noting that the plant was common on Raoul Island, but refused to describe it as a novel species until he was able to compare with specimens of Myrsine crassifolia from Norfolk Island. Cheeseman described the plant four years later, in his article On some Recent Additions to the New Zealand Flora (1892).

== Description ==
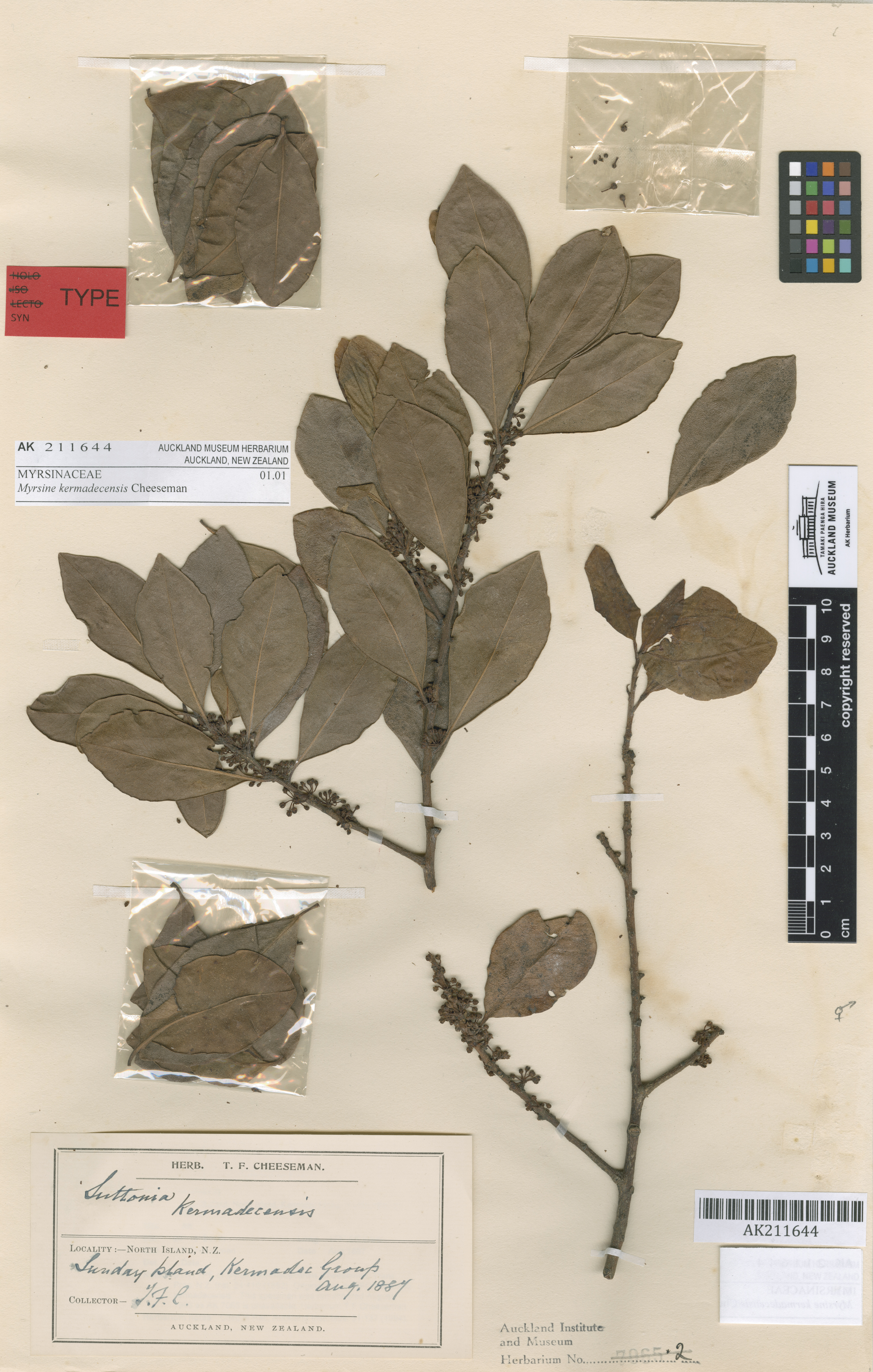
Herbarium specimen of Myrsine kermadecensis, collected by Thomas Cheeseman from Raoul Island in August 1887

Myrsine kermadecensis on average reaches 10 m (33 ft) tall, rounded crown, with rough, firm bark. Leaves are 3–7 cm (1.2–2.8 in) long, and 1–3.5 cm (0.39–1.38 in) wide. Flowers are green-yellow with purple spotting, or a darker red with purple spotting. Fruit are 6–9 mm (0.24–0.35 in) wide. Cheeseman described the species as follows:

A small glabrous tree, with much of the habit and appearance of Drimys axillaris. Bark rough, blackish - brown. Leaves 2in.-2 1/2in. long, obovate-oblong, acute or obtuse, entire, coriaceous, gradually narrowed into short petioles 1/6in.-1/4in. long; margins slightly recurved. Flowers small, diœcious (or polygamous?) in many-flowered clusters on the old wood below the leaves. Pedicels short, rarely over 1/5in. Calyx minute, lobes short, broad. Corolla about 1/8in. long, divided nearly to the base into 5 acute lobes, which are fringed at the sides. Anthers nearly as large as the lobes. Drupe globose, 1/3in.-1/4in. diameter, black when fully ripe.

Cheeseman noted that the plant was phenotypically similar to both Myrsine crassifolia and Myrsine variabilis of Australia; with Myrsine kermadecensis having smaller leaves and longer petioles than Myrsine crassifolia.

When the genus Myrsine was formerly separated into Rapanea and Suttonia, Cheeseman published this further description posthumously in 1925:

A small glabrous tree 8—15 ft. high; bark rough, blackish-brown. Leaves 1 1/2-2 1/2 in. long, elliptic-oblong or obovate-oblong, acute or obtuse, narrowed into petioles 1/6-1/4 in. long, entire, coriaceous, glandular-dotted, veins copiously reticulated, margins slightly recurved. Flowers in many-flowered fascicles on the old wood below the leaves, small, 1/10-1/8 in. diam., unisexual; pedicels short, 1/8-1/6 in. long. Calyx minute, 4-5-lobed; lobes short, broad. Corolla divided nearly to the base into 4 or 5 ovate acute lobes, which are fringed on the margins. Anthers nearly as large as the lobes. Female flowers not seen. Fruit globose, 1/4-1/3 in. diam., black when fully ripe, 1-seeded.

== Distribution and habitat ==
Myrsine kermadecensis is endemic to Raoul Island, Kermadec Islands, where it grows in the subtropical biome, primarily in drier-climate forests, but also is occasionally seen growing within wetter forests.

== Conservation ==
No official conservation status has been assigned to the species by the IUCN Red List yet, for it is generally out of reach within its smaller-sized range.

== Uses ==
Myrsine kermadecensis has no currently listed uses, although its berries are edible and may have been eaten by the Polynesians who arrived on the island in the 14th century.
