= Myrsine juergensenii =

Conservation status
- Least Concern (IUCN 3.1)

Scientific classification
- Kingdom: Plantae
- Clade: Embryophytes
- Clade: Tracheophytes
- Clade: Angiosperms
- Clade: Eudicots
- Clade: Asterids
- Order: Ericales
- Family: Primulaceae
- Genus: Myrsine
- Species: M. juergensenii

Binomial name
- Myrsine juergensenii (Mez) Ricketson & Pipoly

Synonyms
- Homotypic Synonyms: Rapanea juergensenii Mez; Heterotypic Synonyms: Myrsine allenii (Lundell) Lundell; Myrsine chiapensis Lundell; Myrsine coclensis Lundell; Myrsine costaricensis Lundell; Myrsine gillyi Lundell; Myrsine jaliscensis Lundell; Myrsine mexicana (Lundell) Lundell; Myrsine reflexiflora (Lundell) Lundell; Rapanea allenii Lundell; Rapanea chiapensis (Lundell) Lundell; Rapanea coclensis (Lundell) Lundell; Rapanea costaricensis (Lundell) Lundell; Rapanea gillyi (Lundell) Lundell; Rapanea jaliscensis (Lundell) Lundell; Rapanea mexicana Lundell; Rapanea reflexiflora Lundell

Species of flowering plant

Myrsine juergensenii is a species of broadleaf evergreen plant in the family Primulaceae. It is a shrub or tree native to Mexico and Central America, ranging from central Mexico to Panama.
