= Myrsine striata =

Conservation status
- Endangered (IUCN 2.3)

Scientific classification
- Kingdom: Plantae
- Clade: Tracheophytes
- Clade: Angiosperms
- Clade: Eudicots
- Clade: Asterids
- Order: Ericales
- Family: Primulaceae
- Genus: Myrsine
- Species: M. striata

Binomial name
- Myrsine striata (Mez) Ricketson & Pipoly

Synonyms
- Homotypic Synonyms: Rapanea striata Mez

Species of flowering plant

Myrsine striata is a species of broadleaf evergreen tree in the family Primulaceae. It is endemic to the Western Ghats range in southwestern India, where it grows in submontane evergreen forest. It is known from only two widely separated sites, one near Mysore in Karnataka.
