= Myrsine seychellarum =

Conservation status
- Critically Endangered (IUCN 3.1)

Scientific classification
- Kingdom: Plantae
- Clade: Embryophytes
- Clade: Tracheophytes
- Clade: Angiosperms
- Clade: Eudicots
- Clade: Asterids
- Order: Ericales
- Family: Primulaceae
- Genus: Myrsine
- Species: M. seychellarum

Binomial name
- Myrsine seychellarum (Mez) Ricketson & Pipoly

Synonyms
- Homotypic Synonyms: Rapanea seychellarum Mez

Species of flowering plant

Myrsine seychellarum is a species of flowering plant in the family Primulaceae. It is sometimes referred to by the common name Bwa Klate, It is endemic to Seychelles.

The species is assessed on the IUCN Red List as Critically Endangered, facing an extremely high risk of extinction in the wild; the population is estimated to number less than 50 mature individuals. The main sites for the population are Mahé, Silhouette, and Praslin, though other studies have stated the apparent disappearance from Silhouette.
