= Myrsine sodiroana =

Conservation status
- Vulnerable (IUCN 3.1)

Scientific classification
- Kingdom: Plantae
- Clade: Embryophytes
- Clade: Tracheophytes
- Clade: Angiosperms
- Clade: Eudicots
- Clade: Asterids
- Order: Ericales
- Family: Primulaceae
- Genus: Myrsine
- Species: M. sodiroana

Binomial name
- Myrsine sodiroana (Mez) Pipoly

Synonyms
- Homotypic Synonyms: Rapanea sodiroana Mez

Species of flowering plant

Myrsine sodiroana is a species of flowering plant in the family Primulaceae. It is endemic to Ecuador.
