= Myrsine linearifolia =

Conservation status
- Critically Imperiled (NatureServe)

Scientific classification
- Kingdom: Plantae
- Clade: Tracheophytes
- Clade: Angiosperms
- Clade: Eudicots
- Clade: Asterids
- Order: Ericales
- Family: Primulaceae
- Genus: Myrsine
- Species: M. linearifolia

Binomial name
- Myrsine linearifolia Hosaka

Species of flowering plant

Myrsine linearifolia is a rare species of flowering plant in the primrose family known by the common name narrowleaf colicwood. It is endemic to Hawaii, where it is known only from the island of Kauai. There are 12 populations remaining, for a total of fewer than 200 plants. Like other Hawaiian Myrsine this plant is called kōlea. It is a federally listed threatened species of the United States.

This is a shrub or tree growing up to 8 meters tall. There are narrow leaves and clusters of flowers along the branches. It grows in moist and wet habitat on mountain ridges. It is found alongside other forest plants including Antidesma platyphyllum (hame), Broussaisia arguta (kanawao), Chamaesyce remyi (akoko), Cheirodendron fauriei (olapa), Cyanea fissa (haha), Cyrtandra pickeringii (haiwale), Dubautia laxa (naenae pua melemele), Embelia pacifica (kilioe), Freycinetia arborea ('i.e. 'i.e.), Kadua affinis (manono), Lobelia kauaiensis (pue), Machaerina angustifolia (uki), Melicope feddei (alani), Melicope waialealae (alani wai), Perrottetia sandwicensis (olomea), Psychotria hexandra (kopiko), Psychotria mariniana (kopiko), Psychotria wawrae (kōpiko), Sphenomeris chinensis (palaa), and Syzygium sandwicensis (ʻŌhiʻa ha).
