= Myrsine perakensis =

Conservation status
- Data Deficient (IUCN 3.1)

Scientific classification
- Kingdom: Plantae
- Clade: Tracheophytes
- Clade: Angiosperms
- Clade: Eudicots
- Clade: Asterids
- Order: Ericales
- Family: Primulaceae
- Genus: Myrsine
- Species: M. perakensis

Binomial name
- Myrsine perakensis King & Gamble (1905)

Synonyms
- Rapanea perakensis (King & Gamble) B.C.Stone (1981)

Species of flowering plant

Rapanea perakensis is a species of broadleaf evergreen plant in the family Primulaceae. It is endemic to Peninsular Malaysia. The species is threatened by habitat loss.
