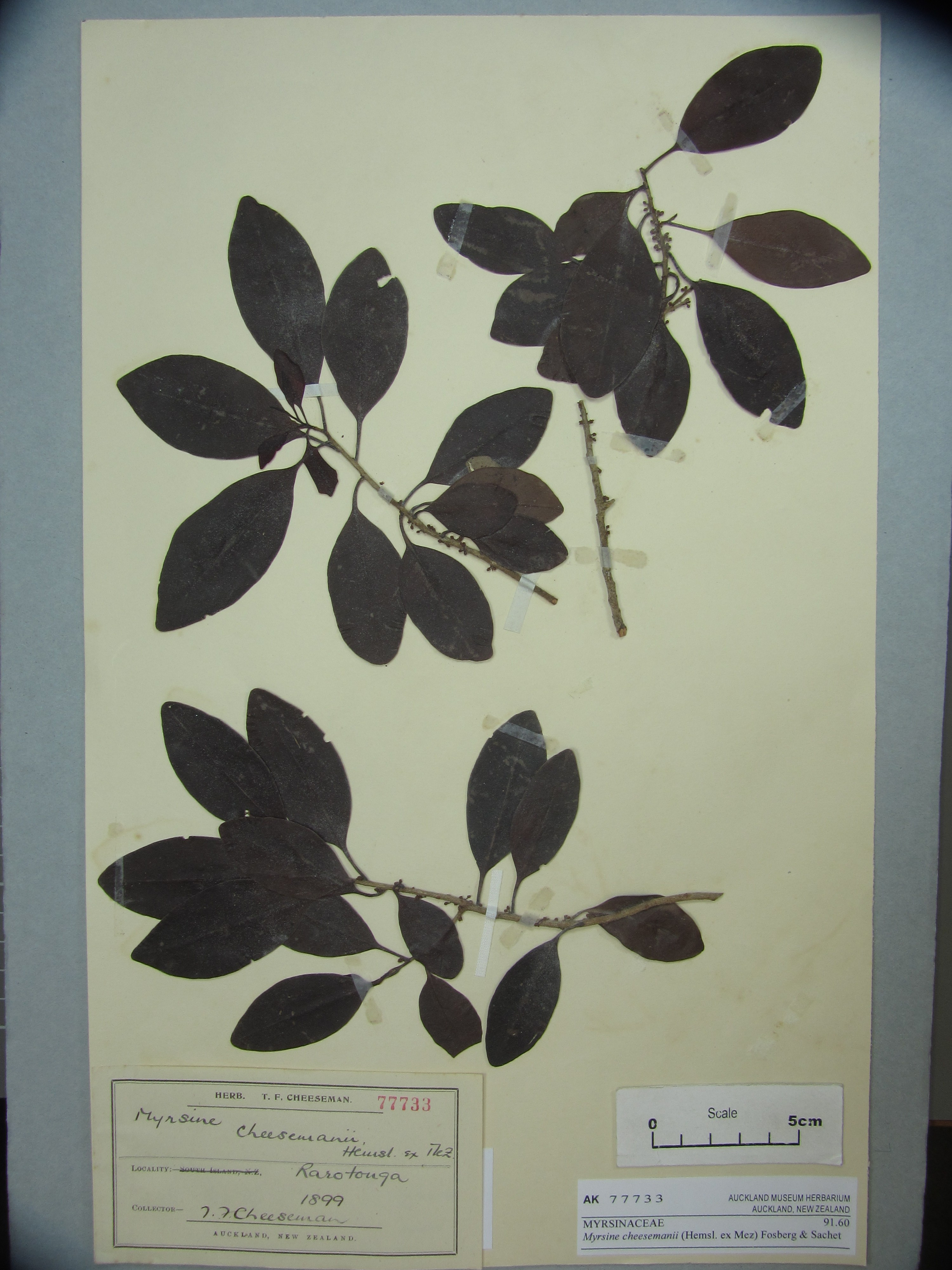
- Herbarium specimen of Myrsine cheesemanii

Conservation status
- Data Deficient (IUCN 3.1)

Scientific classification
- Kingdom: Plantae
- Clade: Embryophytes
- Clade: Tracheophytes
- Clade: Angiosperms
- Clade: Eudicots
- Clade: Asterids
- Order: Ericales
- Family: Primulaceae
- Genus: Myrsine
- Species: M. cheesemanii

Binomial name
- Myrsine cheesemanii (Mez) Hemsl. ex Prain

Synonyms
- Homotypic Synonyms: Rapanea cheesemanii Mez

= Myrsine cheesemanii =

Species of shrub

Myrsine cheesemanii is a species of flowering plant in the family Primulaceae. It is sometimes referred to by the common name Cook Islands Myrsine or ka‘ika makatea (in Mangaia). This shrub is endemic to the Cook Islands, growing on the islands of Rarotonga, Mangaia, Mauke and Mitiaro.
