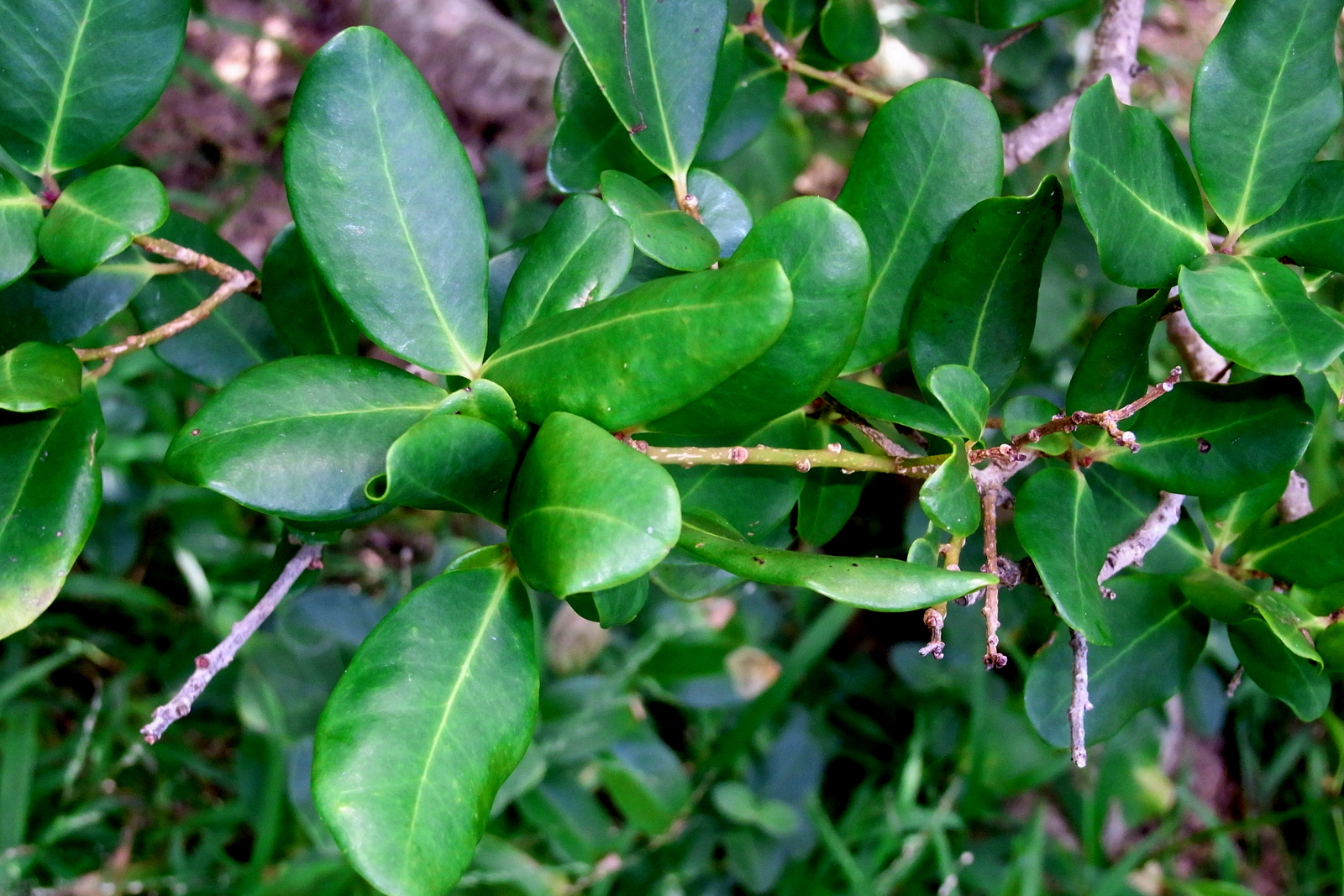

Scientific classification
- Kingdom: Plantae
- Clade: Tracheophytes
- Clade: Angiosperms
- Clade: Eudicots
- Clade: Asterids
- Order: Ericales
- Family: Primulaceae
- Genus: Myrsine
- Species: M. platystigma

Binomial name
- Myrsine platystigma F.Muell. (1873)

Synonyms
- Rapanea platystigma (F.Muell.) Mez (1902)

= Myrsine platystigma =

Species of flowering plant

Myrsine platystigma is a flowering plant in the family Primulaceae. It is a shrub or tree endemic to Lord Howe Island. The specific epithet comes from the Greek platys (“broad”) and stigma, with reference to the relatively broad stigma.

== Description ==
It is a shrub or small tree, growing to 3–6 m in height. The oblanceolate elliptic leaves are 3.5–7 cm long and 1–2.5 cm wide. The tiny flowers are greenish white, spotted and streaked reddish brown. The small round fruits are 3.5–4 mm in diameter and purple when ripe.

== Distribution and habitat ==
The plant is endemic to Australia’s subtropical Lord Howe Island in the Tasman Sea, where it is widespread and commonly found from the lowlands to an elevation of about 400 m.
