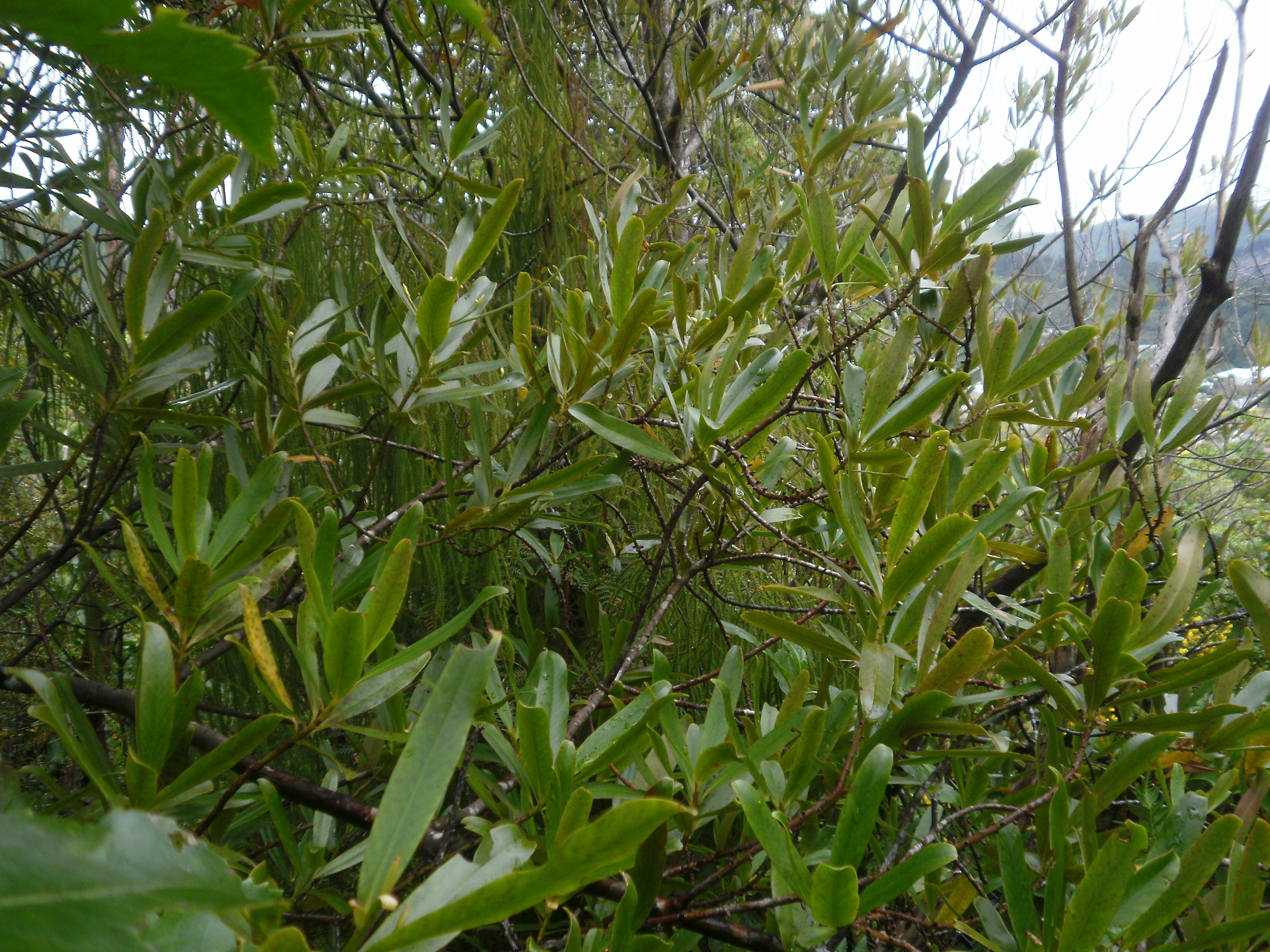

Scientific classification
- Kingdom: Plantae
- Clade: Tracheophytes
- Clade: Angiosperms
- Clade: Eudicots
- Clade: Asterids
- Order: Ericales
- Family: Primulaceae
- Genus: Myrsine
- Species: M. salicina

Binomial name
- Myrsine salicina (Hook.f.) Heward ex Hook.f.

Synonyms
- Rapanea salicina (Hook.f.) Mez; Suttonia salicina Hook.f.

= Myrsine salicina =

Species of plant

Myrsine salicina, synonym Rapanea salicina, commonly known as toro, is a species of shrub or small tree native to New Zealand.

== Description ==
Toro grows to 10 metres in height, with a trunk to 60 cm in diameter. It has long oblong shaped leaves that are thick, glossy and leathery. Clusters of small (3 – 5 mm across) cream to pale pink coloured flowers are produced along the branches in spring, followed by single seeded, reddy-orange fruits.

== Distribution ==
This species is found on both the North and South Islands from the North Cape to southern Westland. Its preferred habitat is lowland to montane forest.

== Threats ==
Toro is threatened in areas where the introduced possums occur, as it is one of their preferred foods.
