= Myrsine myrtillina =

Scientific classification
- Kingdom: Plantae
- Clade: Embryophytes
- Clade: Tracheophytes
- Clade: Angiosperms
- Clade: Eudicots
- Clade: Asterids
- Order: Ericales
- Family: Primulaceae
- Genus: Myrsine
- Species: M. myrtillina

Binomial name
- Myrsine myrtillina (Mez) Jackes

Synonyms
- Homotypic Synonyms: Rapanea myrtillina Mez

Species of flowering plant

Myrsine myrtillina is a flowering plant in the family Primulaceae. It is a shrub endemic to Lord Howe Island. The specific epithet comes from a fancied resemblance of the leaves to those of the myrtle genus Myrtus.

== Description ==
It is a shrub, growing to 3 m in height. The oblanceolate to narrowly oblanceolate leaves are 8–25 mm long and 3–12 mm wide. The small flowers are cream with dark pink spots. The round purple fruits are 3.5–4 mm in diameter.

== Distribution and habitat ==
The plant is endemic to Australia’s subtropical Lord Howe Island in the Tasman Sea, where it is rare upland inhabitant, being found from an elevation of about 400 m upwards to the summits of Mounts Lidgbird and Gower at the southern end of the island.
