= Myrsine reynelii =

Conservation status
- Vulnerable (IUCN 2.3)

Scientific classification
- Kingdom: Plantae
- Clade: Tracheophytes
- Clade: Angiosperms
- Clade: Eudicots
- Clade: Asterids
- Order: Ericales
- Family: Primulaceae
- Genus: Myrsine
- Species: M. reynelii

Binomial name
- Myrsine reynelii Pipoly

Species of plant

Myrsine reynelii is a species of plant in the family Primulaceae. It is endemic to Peru.
