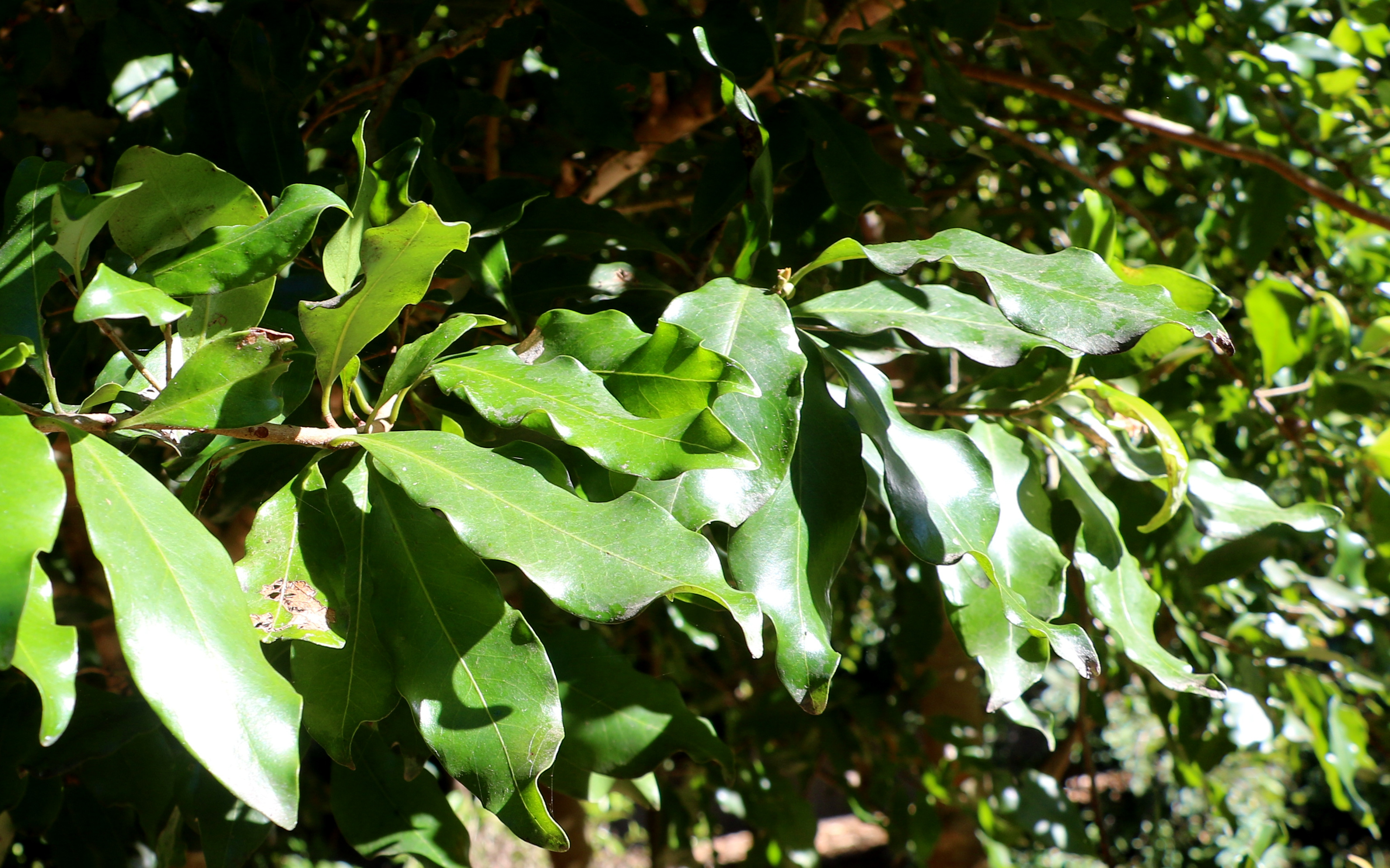

Conservation status
- Endangered (EPBC Act)

Scientific classification
- Kingdom: Plantae
- Clade: Tracheophytes
- Clade: Angiosperms
- Clade: Eudicots
- Clade: Asterids
- Order: Ericales
- Family: Primulaceae
- Genus: Myrsine
- Species: M. richmondensis

Binomial name
- Myrsine richmondensis Jackes

Synonyms
- Rapanea sp. Richmond River (Maiden s.n., Nov 1903); Rapanea sp. A Richmond River (J.H. Maiden & J.L. Boorman NSW 26751); Rapanea sp. A sensu Harden (1990); Rapanea sp. A A

= Myrsine richmondensis =

Species of tree

Myrsine richmondensis, known as the ripple leaf muttonwood or purple-leaf muttonwood, is a very rare shrub of coastal areas of New South Wales; from Coraki on the Richmond River north to Mount Warning.

== Description ==
A shrub to small tree to around 5 metres tall, with a cylindrical trunk and many root suckers. Bark is grey or brown, mostly smooth with elongated cream coloured lenticles. Small branches are mostly rounded in shape with scattered hairs, or hairless.

Adult and juveniles leaves are wavy edged but not toothed. Alternate on the stem, simple and elliptic in shape, 4 to 14 cm long. Leaf stems 3 to 8 mm long. Leaves taper to a blunt point. Mid rib is raised on both sides. Leaves have numerous yellow or red dots, or similarly coloured streak patterns.

=== Flowers and regeneration ===
Greenish white flowers form in bundles of four or five, amongst the leaves or on old wood. Flower stalks are not hairy, 0.5 to 1 mm long. The flowering period is mostly around September to January. Fruit mature between November and January; being a 3 to 4 mm diameter drupe. Regeneration from roots suckers should occur readily. Germination from fresh seed occurs without difficulty. Removal of the fleshy aril is recommended to assist seed germination.

== Taxonomy ==
First collected by colonial botanists by William Baeuerlen near Coraki in January 1892. Published by Betsy Jackes in 2005.
