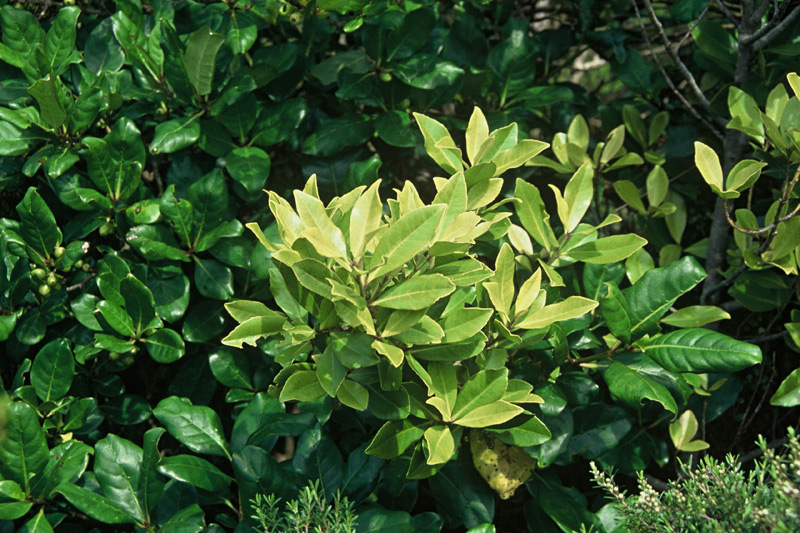

Conservation status
- Vulnerable (IUCN 2.3)

Scientific classification
- Kingdom: Plantae
- Clade: Tracheophytes
- Clade: Angiosperms
- Clade: Eudicots
- Clade: Asterids
- Order: Ericales
- Family: Primulaceae
- Genus: Myrsine
- Species: M. oliveri

Binomial name
- Myrsine oliveri Allan

Synonyms
- Rapanea dentata (W.R.B.Oliv.) W.R.B.Oliv. Suttonia dentata W.R.B.Oliv.

= Myrsine oliveri =

Species of flowering plant

Myrsine oliveri is a species of plant in the family Primulaceae. It is endemic to New Zealand.

A small tree up to about 6 metres tall, with smooth, greyish bark. The leaves are leathery, with a somewhat rough surface when young, obovate to elliptic in shape, rounded at the tip. Flowers are produced in dense clusters, and fruits may not mature until the year after flowering.
