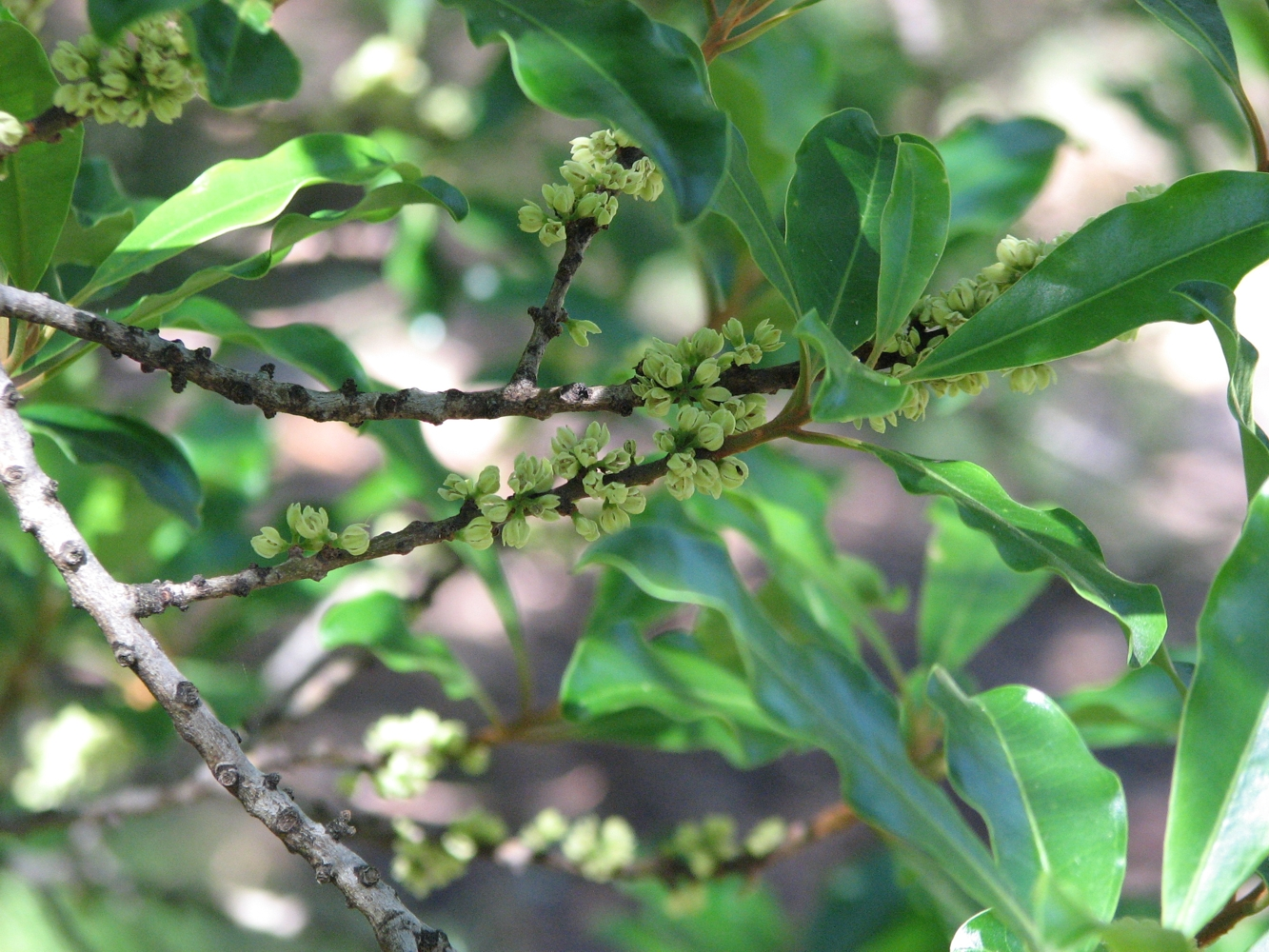

Conservation status
- Least Concern (IUCN 3.1)

Scientific classification
- Kingdom: Plantae
- Clade: Embryophytes
- Clade: Tracheophytes
- Clade: Angiosperms
- Clade: Eudicots
- Clade: Asterids
- Order: Ericales
- Family: Primulaceae
- Genus: Myrsine
- Species: M. howittiana

Binomial name
- Myrsine howittiana (F.Muell. ex Mez) Jackes

Synonyms
- Rapanea howittiana Mez

= Myrsine howittiana =

Species of tree

Myrsine howittiana, the brush muttonwood or muttonwood, is a shrub or small tree in the family Primulaceae. The species is endemic to eastern Australia.

It grows to between 3 and 10 metres in height and has smooth, often whitish, bark. The buds of new growth are covered with rusty-coloured hairs. The leaves are obovate to elliptic in shape and between 4 and 13 cm long and 2 to 4 cm wide. These are shiny with wavy edges and a duller undersurface and have petioles that are 7 to 14 mm in length. Greenish-white to cream flowers are produced in spring and summer. These are followed by blue or mauve fruits which are 5 to 7 mm in diameter and ripen between December and June.

The species is pollinated by a thrips (thunderfly), Thrips setipennis. The species occurs from southern Victoria (37° S), northwards through New South Wales to Fraser Island (25° S) in Queensland often in areas where rainforest interfaces with moist open forest.
