= Myrsine ceylanica =

Conservation status
- Critically Endangered (IUCN 2.3)

Scientific classification
- Kingdom: Plantae
- Clade: Embryophytes
- Clade: Tracheophytes
- Clade: Angiosperms
- Clade: Eudicots
- Clade: Asterids
- Order: Ericales
- Family: Primulaceae
- Genus: Myrsine
- Species: M. ceylanica

Binomial name
- Myrsine ceylanica (Mez) Wadhwa

Synonyms
- Homotypic Synonyms: Rapanea ceylanica Mez; Heterotypic Synonyms: Myrsine capitellata var. sessiliflora Thwaites; Rapanea robusta var. sessiliflora (Thwaites) Alston

Species of flowering plant

Myrsine ceylanica is species of flowering plant in the family Primulaceae.
