= Myrsine mccomishii =

Scientific classification
- Kingdom: Plantae
- Clade: Tracheophytes
- Clade: Angiosperms
- Clade: Eudicots
- Clade: Asterids
- Order: Ericales
- Family: Primulaceae
- Genus: Myrsine
- Species: M. mccomishii

Binomial name
- Myrsine mccomishii (Sprague) Jackes (2005)

Synonyms
- Rapanea mccomishii Sprague (1944)

Species of flowering plant

Myrsine mccomishii is a flowering plant in the family Primulaceae. It is a tree endemic to Lord Howe Island. The specific epithet honours James Doran McComish (1881–1948), who made several visits to, and collected extensively on, Lord Howe Island in the 1930s.

== Description ==
It is a smooth-stemmed tree, growing to 15 m in height. The oblanceolate-elliptic leaves are 5–7 cm long and 1.7–2.5 cm wide. The flowers are tiny. The round purple fruits are 4–5 mm in diameter.

== Distribution and habitat ==
The plant is endemic to Australia’s subtropical Lord Howe Island in the Tasman Sea, where it is uncommon, having a scattered distribution, mainly at lower elevations.
