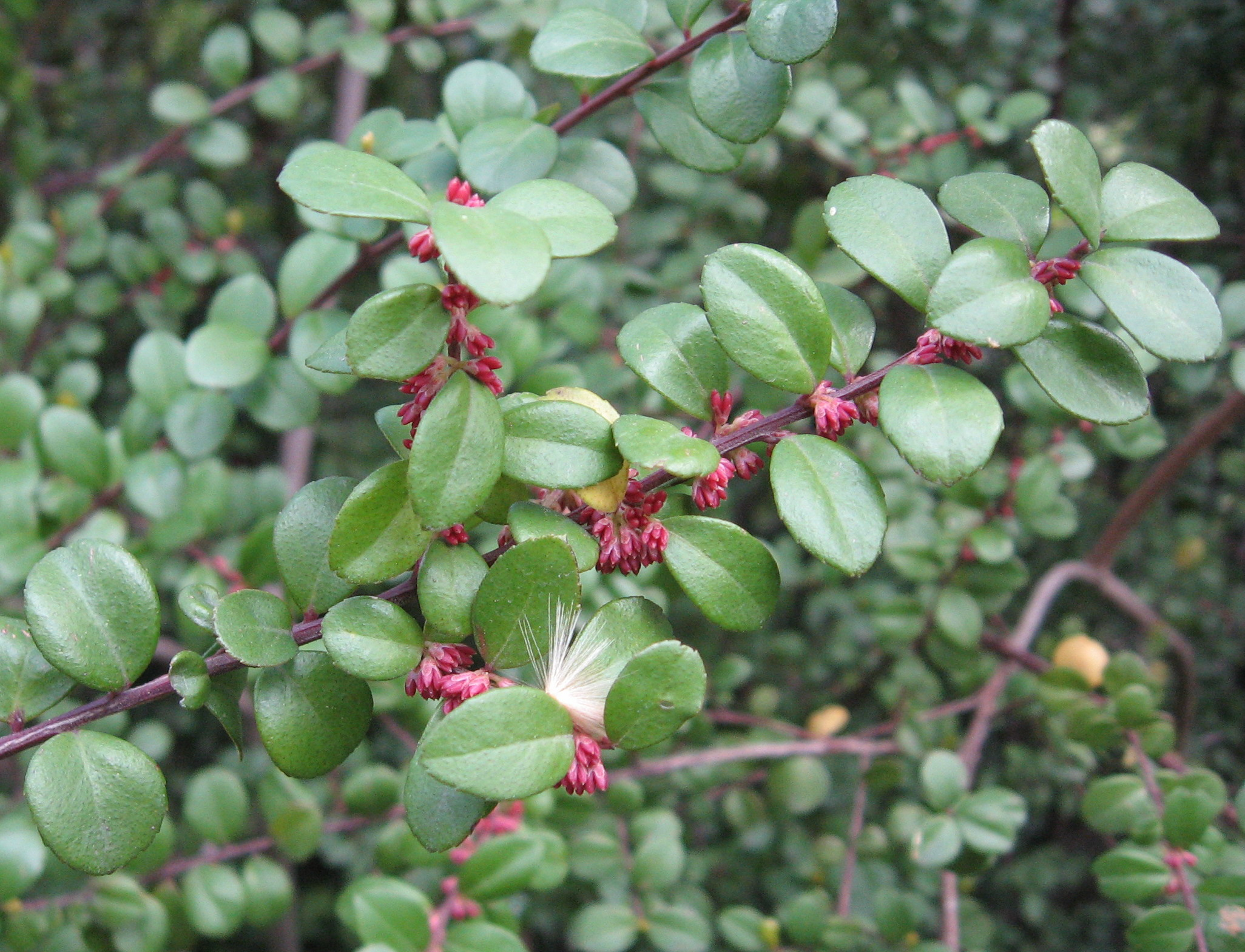
- Male plant in flower

Scientific classification
- Kingdom: Plantae
- Clade: Tracheophytes
- Clade: Angiosperms
- Clade: Eudicots
- Clade: Asterids
- Order: Ericales
- Family: Primulaceae
- Genus: Myrsine
- Species: M. africana

Binomial name
- Myrsine africana L.

Synonyms
- Synonymy: Buxus dioica Forssk; Myrica arabica Willd.; Myrica montana Vahl; Myrsine acuta Salisb.; Myrsine africana var. acuminata C. Y. Wu & C. Chen; Myrsine africana var. bifaria (Wall.) Franch.; Myrsine africana var. glandulosa J. M. Zhang; Myrsine africana var. retusa A. DC.; Myrsine bifaria Wall.; Myrsine bottensis A. DC.; Myrsine glabra Gaertn.; Myrsine microphylla Hayata (Ambiguous); Myrsine potama D. Don; Myrsine retusa Aiton; Myrsine rotundifolia Lam. (Ambiguous); Myrsine scabra Gaertn.; Myrsine vaccinifolia Hayata; Rhamnus myrtillus H. Lév.; Samara potama Buch.-Ham. ex D. Don

= Myrsine africana =

Cape myrtle

Species of shrub

Myrsine africana, also called Cape myrtle, African boxwood or thakisa, is a species of shrub in the family Primulaceae. It is indigenous to Southern and Eastern Africa, the Azores, the Arabian Peninsula, South Asia and East Asia.

== Description ==
The shrub can achieve heights of over 2 metres (6.6 ft) and may be dense if pruned or grown in strong sunlight. The fine-toothed leaves are at first deep red, but on maturity become glossy and dark green. The cream-coloured flowers appear in spring, with the male flowers boasting red anthers. Separate shrubs produce either male or female flowers, with the female plants also producing small purple berries. The foliage is dense, and dark-green to red in color. The hardy plant is long-lived.

M. africana sends up occasional shoots from its root system that go on to form new plants. It propagates easily from seed.

== Uses ==
Parts of the plant are used in milk and meat-based soups by the Batemi and Masai people of Africa, which is thought to reduce cholesterol levels in tribes that consume large amounts of meat. The flowers are also eaten. A powder derived from the plant's leaves is called katam (كتم), used to dye hair since ancient times.

Cape myrtle is increasingly popular for topiaries and small hedges, as it can so readily be pruned and shaped.

== Gallery ==
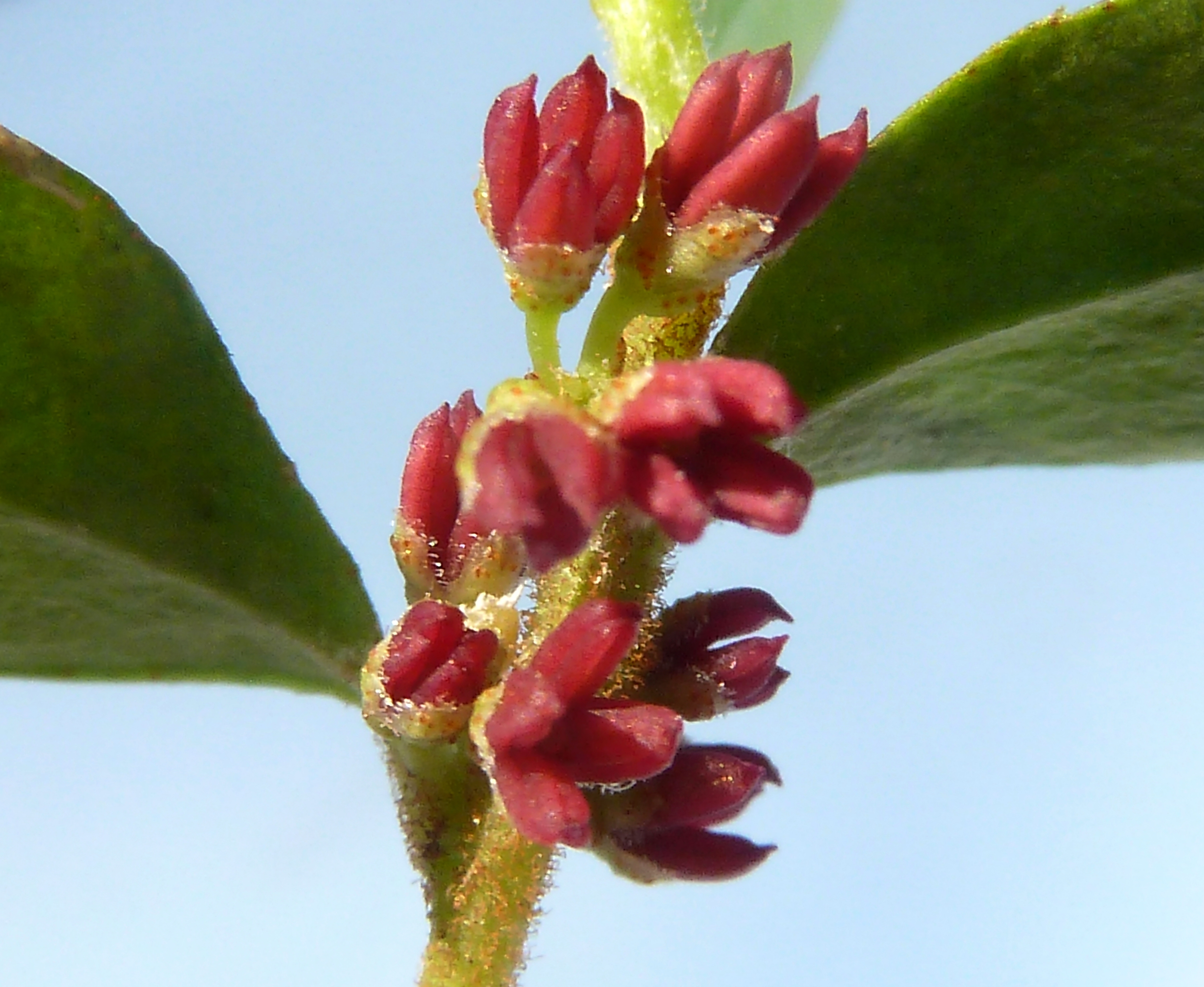
Flowers of male plant with colourful anthers

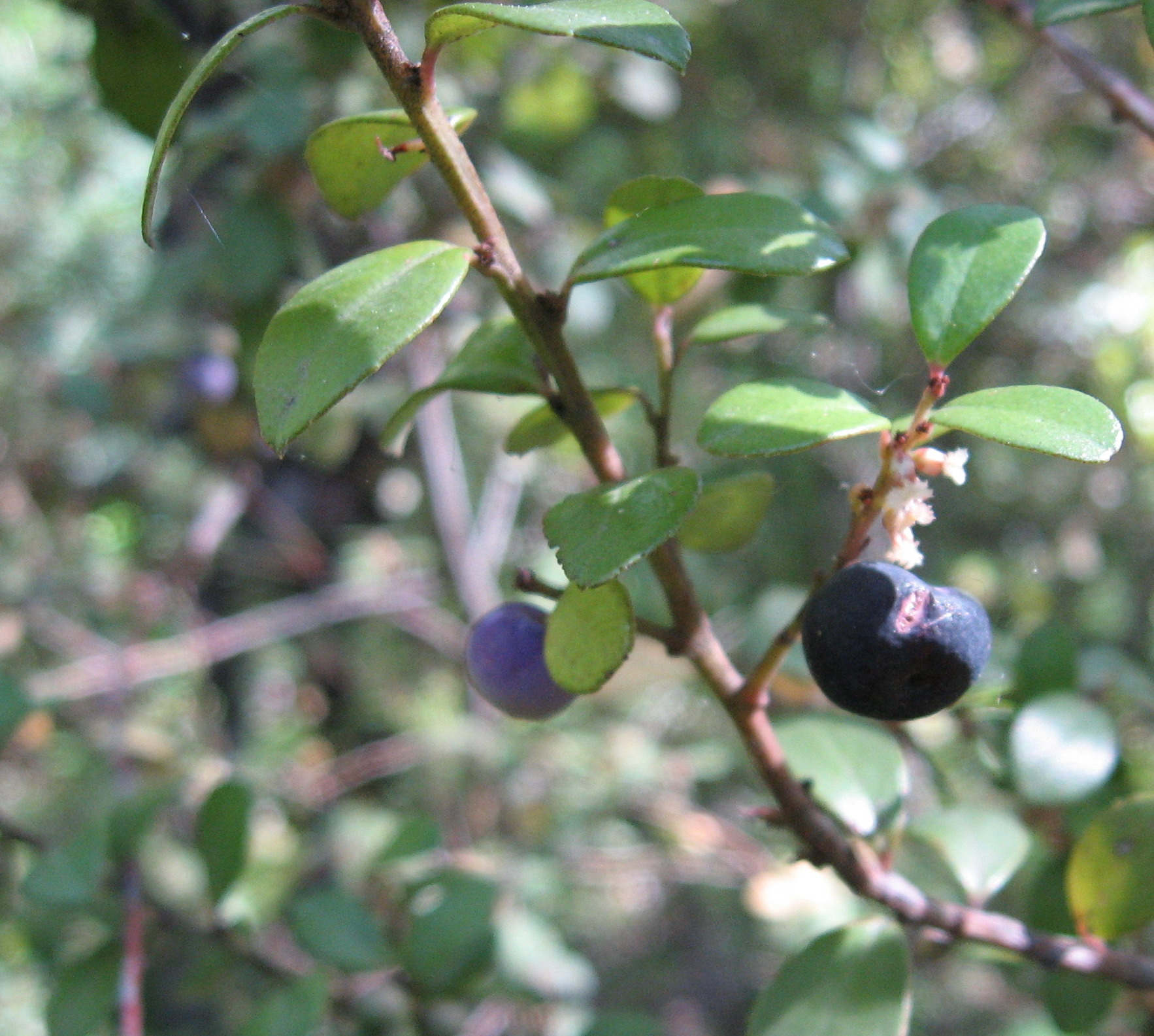
Female plant with white flowers and purple fruit

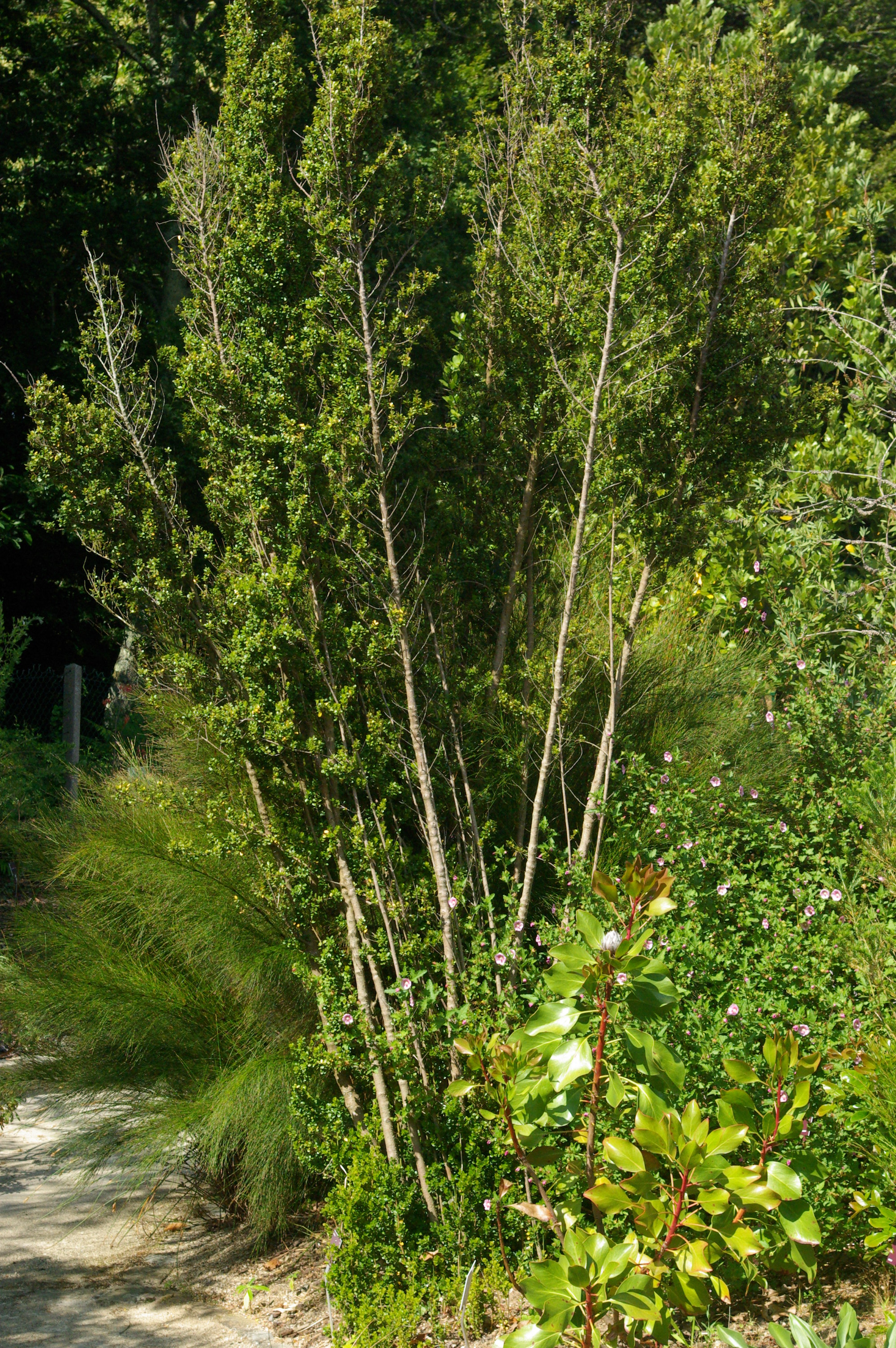
Full shrub

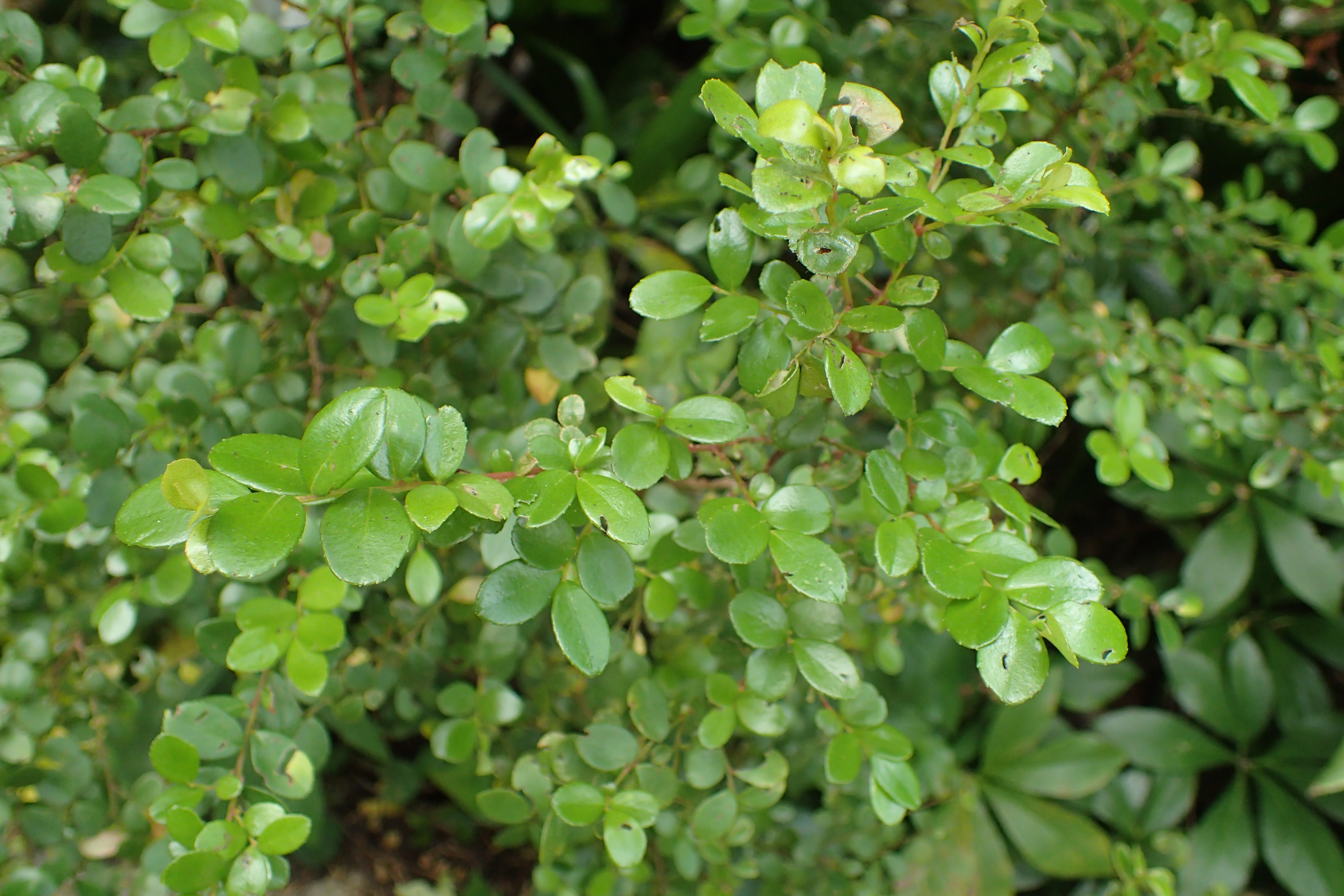
Close-up of leaves
