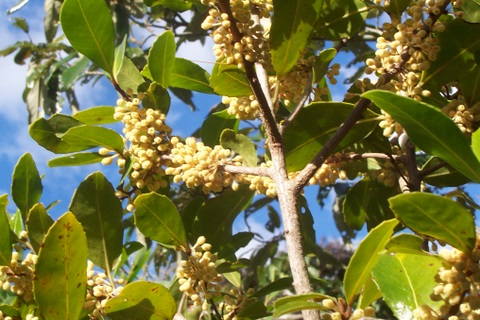
- At Norah Head

Scientific classification
- Kingdom: Plantae
- Clade: Tracheophytes
- Clade: Angiosperms
- Clade: Eudicots
- Clade: Asterids
- Order: Ericales
- Family: Primulaceae
- Genus: Myrsine
- Species: M. variabilis

Binomial name
- Myrsine variabilis R.Br.

Synonyms
- Heurlinia variabilis (R.Br.) Raf.; Myrsine campanulata F.Muell.; Rapanea campanulata (F.Muell.) Mez; Rapanea variabilis (R.Br.) Mez

= Myrsine variabilis =

Species of tree

Myrsine variabilis, synonym Rapanea variabilis, known as the muttonwood or variable muttonwood is a tree of eastern Australia. The range of natural distribution is from near Milton (35° S) in southern New South Wales to the McIlwraith Range in far north Queensland (13° S).

The habitat of the muttonwood is at the edges of rainforests of various types; including tropical, sub-tropical, warm temperate and littoral rainforest.

== Description ==
A small tree to around 15 metres tall and up to 50 cm in stem diameter. Noticeable for the dense, dark foliage and attractive blue fruit.

The trunk is straight and mostly cylindrical. The base of the tree is not buttressed. Bark is grey or brown, somewhat corky and rough with various irregularities; such as horizontal lines and vertical cracks.

Leaves are practically sessile, the leaf stalks less than 5 mm long. Leaves alternate, toothed on young plants, wavy edged and relatively stiff. Reverse lanceolate to oblong or egg shaped; 3 to 8 cm long, not usually with a tip at the point. Leaf veins are raised and noticeable on both surfaces.

Cream flowers form in clusters along the ends of branches. 2 mm long flowers on 4 mm long flower stalks, the flowering period is mostly around July to August. The blue or violet coloured fruit mature between November and December; being a 4 to 6 mm diameter drupe.

The fruit is eaten by Lewin's honeyeater and the rose crowned fruit dove. Germination from fresh seed occurs without difficulty. Removal of the fleshy aril is recommended to assist seed germination.
