= Jean Nadeaud =

French naval surgeon, physician and botanist

Jean Nadeaud (1834 – 20 November 1898) was a French naval surgeon, physician and botanist.

From February 1856 to August 1859, he lived in Tahiti, where he studied and collected plants native to the island. In 1864, he received his doctorate from the faculty of medicine at Montpellier with a thesis on medicinal plants used in Tahiti, "Plantes usuelles des tahitiens".

In 1873, he published an enumeration of the plants of Tahiti that included dozens of taxa new to science, "Enumération des plantes indigènes de l'île de Tahiti recueillies et classées". His herbarium was acquired by Emmanuel Drake del Castillo, who sent some of its moss specimens to bryologist Émile Bescherelle.

He spent the last two years of his life in Tahiti as a physician and plant collector. The moss genus Nadeaudia (family Calomniaceae) was named in his honor by Émile Bescherelle.
