= John J. Pipoly III =

American botanist and plant collector (born 1955)

John James Pipoly III (born September 5, 1955) is an American botanist and plant collector. He is a leading expert on the systematics and taxonomy of the genus Ardisia within the Myrsinoideae, as well as the family Clusiaceae.

== Biology ==
Pipoly graduated in 1978 with a B.Sc. in botany from Michigan State University. In 1986 he graduated with a Ph.D. in botany from the Graduate Center of the City University of New York as part of a joint program with the New York Botanical Garden. His thesis "Monograph of Cybianthus p. p. (Myrsinaceae)" was supervised by Scott A. Mori. In 1986 in the Bronx, Pipoly married Fabiola Monje. The newlyweds arrived in Guyana in April 1986, where John J. Pipoly III was the first resident collector on the "Flora of the Guianas" Program sponsored by the Smithsonian Institution, two universities, and five other institutes. After 13 months in Guyana, where he collected thousands of botanical specimens, he and his wife returned to the US, where he had a post-doctoral position at the National Museum of Natural History. After working as a Contract Specialist at Environmental Protection Agency Headquarters, he worked at the Missouri Botanical Garden in the early 1990s and at the Botanical Research Institute of Texas from 1995 to 2001. He then became the Urban Horticulture Extension Agent, Institute of Food and Agricultural Sciences, Fort Lauderdale, Florida, and an adjunct professor at Nova Southeastern University.

... he spent years trekking the jungles and liana forests of Central and South America and Southeast Asia. He's been dropped off by helicopter to collect samples in the most remote and least botanically known areas of Guyana, trained foresters and ecologists in Columbia, and helped found an herbarium in Peru. Pipoly has also played a part in the discovery of about 100 new plant species ...

John has published 150 original research papers among internationally peer-reviewed journals and conducted fieldwork throughout the Tropical Americas, the Philippines and New Guinea. He is an authority on the classification of the Marlberry and St. John's Wort plant families as well as tropical tree architectural models. For four decades he has collaborated with scientific consortia to document permanent biodiversity monitoring plots in the Americas, Caribbean, and Southeast Asia/Pacific regions.

He also ran a Master Gardener Program in Florida.

In Fort Lauderdale, Pipoly gave important, expert testimony in a murder case in which plant parts were mixed among human body parts.

== Selected publications ==
- Adams, M. W.; Pipoly III, J. J. (1980). "Biological structure, classification and distribution of economic legumes". In Summerfield, R. J.; Bunting, A. H. (eds.). Advances in Legume Science. Kew, England: Royal Botanic Garden. pp. 1–16.
- Mori, Scott A.; Pipoly, John J. (1984). "Observations on the Big Bang Flowering of Miconia minutiflora (Melastomataceae)". Brittonia. 36 (4): 337. doi:10.2307/2806595. ISSN 0007-196X. JSTOR 2806595. S2CID 84465485.
- Pipoly III, John J. (1992). "The Genus Cybianthus Subgenus Conomorpha (Myrsinaceae) in Guayana". Annals of the Missouri Botanical Garden. 79 (4): 908–957. doi:10.2307/2399725. JSTOR 2399725.
- Pipoly III, John J.; Graff, Allison (1995). "A synopsis of the genus Clusia sections Criuvopsis and Brachystemon (Clusiaceae) in northern South America". SIDA, Contributions to Botany. 16 (3): 505–528. JSTOR 41967155.
- Ricketson, Jon M.; Pipoly III, J. J. (1997). "Nomenclatural notes and a synopsis of the genus Myrsine (Myrsinaceae) in Mesoamerica". SIDA, Contributions to Botany: 579–589. JSTOR 41967290.
- Pipoly III, John J. (1998). "The genus Cybianthus (Myrsinaceae) in Ecuador and Peru". SIDA, Contributions to Botany. 18 (1): 1–160. JSTOR 41967290.

== Wikispecies ==
- Data related to John James Pipoly III at Wikispecies
