= Edward Yataro Hosaka =

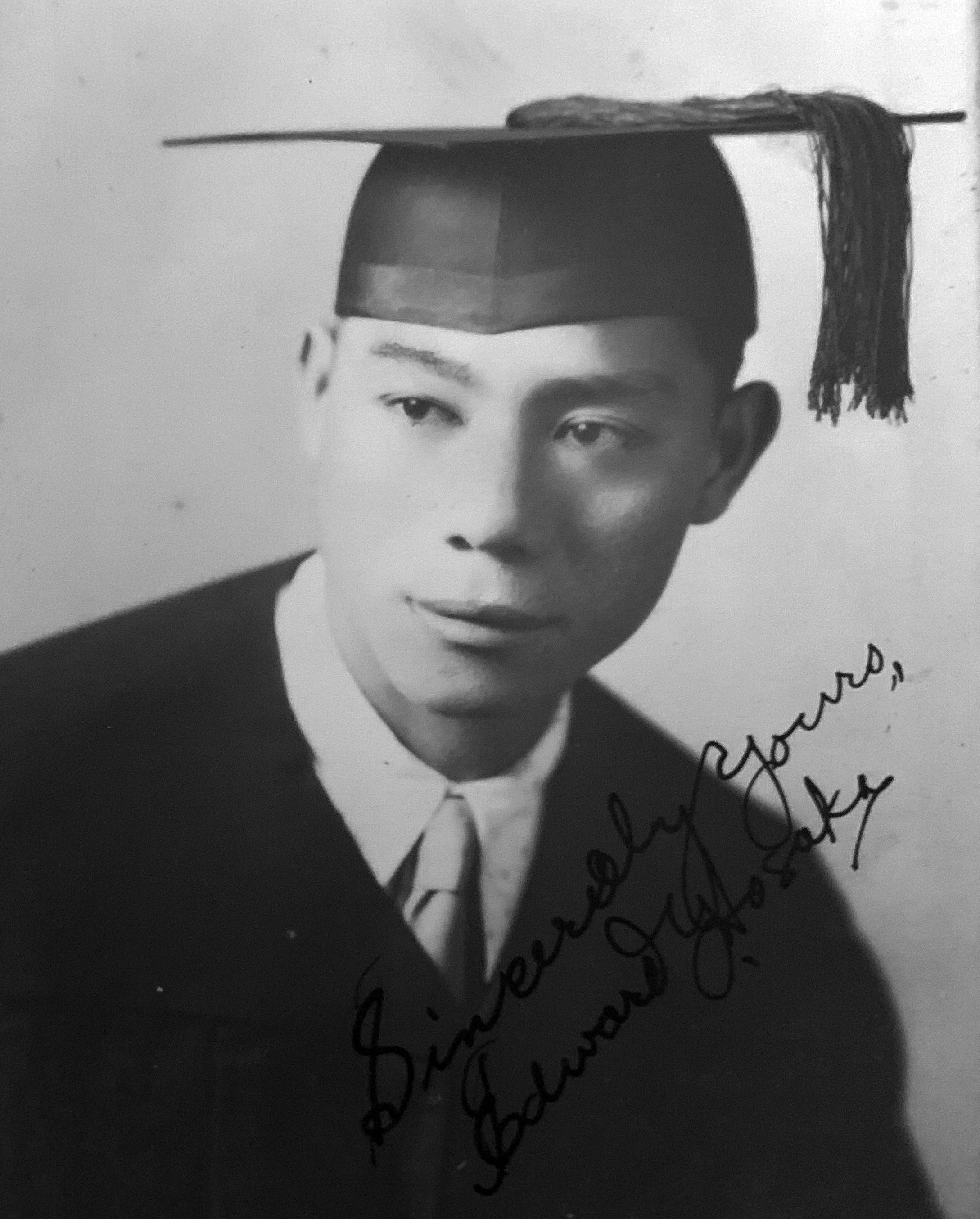
Edward Hosaka c. 1931

Edward Yataro Hosaka (1906 - 1961) was an American botanist who specialized in identifying plants of the Hawaiian Islands. His 1935 University of Hawaiʻi at Mānoa masters thesis was entitled 'A Floristic and Ecological Study of Kipapa Gulch'. He authored Sport Fishing in Hawaii published in 1944 which was republished in 1973 as Shore Fishing in Hawaii. In 2024, a biography of Edward Hosaka was published by the Bishop Museum Occasional Papers.
