= Marie-Hélène Sachet =

French botanist (1922–1986)

- Born: 1922
- Died: 1986 (aged 63–64)
- Occupation: French botanist
- Scientific career
- Workplaces: National Museum of Natural History
- Author abbrev. (botany): Sachet

Marie-Hélène Sachet (1922–1986) was a French botanist. In 1966, she commenced work at the Smithsonian Institution, rising to the position of curator of botany at the American National Museum of Natural History.

The Abutilon sachet is a rare plant that was named after her.

== Biography ==
Sachet was awarded her Doctor of Philosophy degree by her alma mater, the University of Montpellier, France, in 1961.

According to her co-author Francis Raymond Fosberg, Sachet was working at the University of Paris in cell biology in 1949 when she travelled to Washington D.C. to work on the Pacific Vegetation Project. In 1951, the project was transferred to the U.S. Geological Survey, where Fosberg and Sachet were given roles as Pacific Islands vegetation experts for the Military Geology Branch. Their first major objective was to conduct an extensive study of the Northern Marshall Atolls. They continued to work in that capacity for 15 years, which involved working closely with the Pacific Science Board (PSB) of the National Academy of Sciences-National Research Council.

Sachet spent much of the project's first seven years compiling a "massive bibliographic study of island literature, extracting and organizing information, producing a large volume, Island Bibliographies, published by the National Academy of Sciences-National Research Council. At the same time, she was involved with handling a vast inflow of specimens and field data, never seeing a coral island herself until 1957." She joined the Smithsonian in 1966.

During her lifetime, she became a recognized expert who made many contributions to the scientific knowledge of coral islands.

She died suddenly in 1986. At that time, she was a curator in the Department of Botany, National Museum of Natural History.

== Legacy ==
The Smithsonian Institution Archives has records that she collected, including a 1982 photograph located in Record Unit 371, Box 4, Folder: January 1983.

== Selected works ==
- Fosberg, Francis Raymond, and Marie-Hélène Sachet. "Manual for tropical herbaria." (1965): 132-pp.
- Fosberg, Francis Raymond, Marjorie VC Falanruw, and Marie-Hélène Sachet. Vascular flora of the northern Marianas Islands. Smithsonian Institution Press, 1975.
- Fosberg, F. Raymond, Marie-Helene Sachet, and Royce Oliver. "A geographical checklist of the Micronesian Dicotyledonae." Micronesica 15, no. 1-2 (1979): 41-295.
- Fosberg, Francis Raymond, and Marie-Hélène Sachet. "Studies in Indo-Pacific Rubiaceae." Allertonia (1991): 191-278.
- Fosberg, Francis Raymond, and Marie Hélène Sachet. Flora of Micronesia. No. 46. US Government Printing Office, 1980.
