= Francis Raymond Fosberg =

American botanist

- Born: 20 May 1908; Spokane, Washington
- Died: 25 September 1993 (aged 85); Falls Church, Virginia
- Occupation: Botanist

Francis Raymond Fosberg (20 May 1908 – 25 September 1993) was an American botanist. A prolific collector and author, he played a significant role in the development of coral reef and island studies.

== History ==
Ray Fosberg was born in Spokane, Washington but grew up in Turlock, California. He received a B.A. in Botany at Pomona College in 1930. Fosberg worked as a plant researcher at the Los Angeles County Museum, specializing in plants from islands on the coast of California and of the desert Southwest.

He became interested in island ecosystems, and in 1932 moved to Honolulu to work at the University of Hawaii as an assistant to Harold St. John. There he received an invitation to participate in the Mangarevan Expedition led by the malacologist Charles Montague Cooke, Jr. The expedition visited 25 high islands and 31 coral islands, and Fosberg and St. John brought back 15,000 plant specimens.

Fosberg received his M.S. in Botany from the University of Hawaii in 1937 and his Ph.D. from the University of Pennsylvania in 1939 . Thereafter he worked at the USDA and was sent to Colombia to identify stands of Cinchona during the Cinchona Missions. In 1946 he participated in an economic resources survey in the Micronesian Islands. He returned to the United States and began doing vegetation work for the Pacific Science Board under the National Research Council with his new assistant, Marie-Hélène Sachet.

In 1951, Fosberg and Sachet began working at the United States Geological Survey where they were responsible for mapping the military geology of islands in the Pacific. In 1966 they joined the Smithsonian's National Museum of Natural History in the tropical biology branch of the Ecology program. In 1968 Fosberg transferred to the Department of Botany, where he became curator. In 1976 he became Senior Botanist, and in 1993 Botanist Emeritus.

José Cuatrecasas and Fosberg were largely responsible for the founding of UNESCO's Organization for Flora Neotropica in 1964.

== Publications ==
Fosberg has contributed to more than 700 books and papers. In 1980 he helped publish A Revised Handbook to the Flora of Ceylon (ISBN 9061910692).
