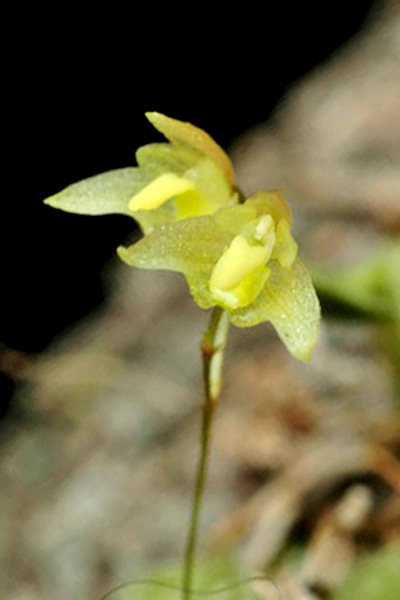
- Bulbophyllum exiguum

Scientific classification
- Kingdom: Plantae
- Clade: Tracheophytes
- Clade: Angiosperms
- Clade: Monocots
- Order: Asparagales
- Family: Orchidaceae
- Subfamily: Epidendroideae
- Genus: Bulbophyllum
- Section: Bulbophyllum sect. Uncifera; Schlechter 1912

Type species
- Bulbophyllum ochroleucum

Species
- See text

Synonyms
- Bulbophyllum sect. Diceras Schltr., 1912; Bulbophyllum subg. Harpobrachium Schltr., 1912; Bulbophyllum sect. Manobulbon Schltr., 1912

= Bulbophyllum sect. Uncifera =

Section of flowering plants

Bulbophyllum sect. Uncifera is a section of the genus Bulbophyllum.

== Description ==
Species in this section is distinguished by several racemose flowers, the column and lip are fused.

== Distribution ==
Plants from this section are found in New Guinea, New Caledonia, Solomon Islands and Australia.

== Species ==
Bulbophyllum section Uncifera comprises the following species:

Image	Name	Distribution	Elevation (m)
	Bulbophyllum bigibbum Schltr. 1923	New Guinea	1,000–2,500 metres (3,300–8,200 ft)
	Bulbophyllum cavibulbum J J Sm. 1929	New Guinea	3,200–3,260 metres (10,500–10,700 ft)
	Bulbophyllum cylindrobulbum Schltr. 1905	New Caledonia, New Guinea and the Solomon Islands	1,800 metres (5,900 ft)
	Bulbophyllum exiguum F. Mueller 1860	Australia	1,000 metres (3,300 ft)
	Bulbophyllum gracilipes King & Pantl. 1896	Sikkim and Darjeeling	400–500 metres (1,300–1,600 ft)
	Bulbophyllum hatusimanum Tuyama 1940	Caroline, Palau	
	Bulbophyllum laxum Schltr. 1905	New Guinea	200–1,400 metres (660–4,590 ft)
	Bulbophyllum manobulbum Schltr. 1905	New Guinea and the Solomon Islands	500–1,800 metres (1,600–5,900 ft)
	Bulbophyllum ochroleucum Schltr. 1905	Papua New Guinea	800–3,200 metres (2,600–10,500 ft)
	Bulbophyllum posticum J.J.Sm.1911	New Guinea	800–2,500 metres (2,600–8,200 ft)
	Bulbophyllum sarasinorum Schltr. 1925	Sulawesi	
