= List of plants known as myrtle =

Myrtle is part of the English common name of many trees and other plants, particularly those of the myrtle family (Myrtaceae).

Plants called "myrtle" include:

== Myrtaceae ==
- Myrtaceae, the myrtle family
  - Myrtus, myrtle, genus native to Europe and north Africa
    - Myrtus communis, common, European, or true myrtle, cultivated worldwide
    - Myrtus nivellei, Saharan myrtle
  - Luma apiculata, Chilean myrtle
  - Ugni molinae, Strawberry myrtle, native to Chile

== Non-Australian natives, not in Myrtaceae ==
- Family Cyrillaceae
  - Cyrilla racemiflora, myrtle
- Family Lauraceae
  - Umbellularia californica, Oregon myrtle
- Family Myricaceae
  - Myrica, wax myrtle, bayberry
- Family Lythraceae
  - Lagerstroemia, crepe myrtle
- Family Apocynaceae
  - Vinca minor, creeping myrtle

== Australian/Asian natives, many not in Myrtaceae ==
- Family Ebenaceae
  - Diospyros pentamera, black myrtle
- Family Fabaceae
  - Acacia myrtifolia, myrtle wattle
- Family Myrtaceae
  - Agonis flexuosa, willow myrtle
  - Archirhodomyrtus beckleri, rose myrtle
  - Backhousia angustifolia, curry myrtle
  - Backhousia citriodora, lemon myrtle, sweet verbena myrtle
  - Backhousia myrtifolia, cinnamon myrtle, grey myrtle
  - Choricarpia leptopetala, brown myrtle
  - Hypocalymma angustifolium, white myrtle
  - Leptospermum scoparium, manuka myrtle
  - Melaleuca armillaris, bracelet honey myrtle
  - Melaleuca radula, graceful honey myrtle
  - Syzygium anisatum, aniseed myrtle
- Family Nothofagaceae
  - Nothofagus cunninghamii, myrtle beech
- Family Pittosporaceae
  - Auranticarpa rhombifolia, white myrtle
- Family Proteaceae
  - Hakea myrtoides, myrtle hakea
- Family Scrophulariaceae
  - Myoporum parvifolium, dwarf native myrtle
