= Hibbertia ferox =

Scientific classification
- Kingdom: Plantae
- Clade: Tracheophytes
- Clade: Angiosperms
- Clade: Eudicots
- Order: Dilleniales
- Family: Dilleniaceae
- Genus: Hibbertia
- Species: H. ferox

Binomial name
- Hibbertia ferox Jackes

Species of flowering plant

Hibbertia ferox is a species of flowering plant in the family Dilleniaceae and is endemic to Queensland. It is a shrub with sharply-pointed linear leaves and yellow flowers, usually with nine stamens in a single group on one side of two glabrous carpels.

== Description ==
Hibbertia ferox is a multi-stemmed shrub that typically grows to a height of 30–70 cm (12–28 in) and up to 1 m (3 ft 3 in) wide. Its leaves are crowded, mostly 5–11 mm (0.20–0.43 in) long, about 1.5 mm (0.059 in) wide and sharply-pointed on a petiole about 0.5 mm (0.020 in) long. The flowers are arranged on the ends of branchlets and are sessile with four or five broadly lance-shaped bracts 2.0–2.5 mm (0.079–0.098 in) long at the base. The five sepals are joined at the base, the three outer sepals about 8 mm (0.31 in) long and the inner sepals up to 10 mm (0.39 in) long. The five petals are yellow, egg-shaped with the narrower end towards the base and 10–15 mm (0.39–0.59 in) long with a deep notch at the tip. There are usually nine stamens free from each other on one side of two glabrous carpels.

== Taxonomy ==
Hibbertia ferox was first formally described in 2018 Betsy Rivers Jackes in the journal Austrobaileya from specimens collected in the White Mountains National Park in 2000. The specific epithet (ferox) means "fierce" referring to the sharp point on the end of the leaves.

== Distribution and habitat ==
This hibbertia grows on sandy soils and is common on the Burra Range in the White Mountains National Park.

== Conservation status ==
Hibbertia ferox is listed as of "least concern" under the Queensland Government Nature Conservation Act 1992.

== See also ==
- List of Hibbertia species
