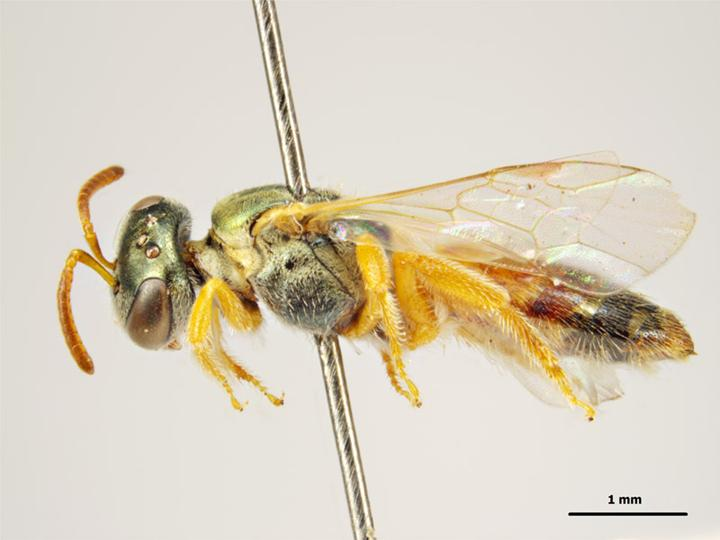
- Female

Scientific classification
- Kingdom: Animalia
- Phylum: Arthropoda
- Clade: Pancrustacea
- Class: Insecta
- Order: Hymenoptera
- Family: Halictidae
- Genus: Lasioglossum
- Species: L. sphecodopse

Binomial name
- Lasioglossum sphecodopse (Cockerell, 1905)

Synonyms
- Halictus sphecodopsis Cockerell, 1905; Halictus eyrei Cockerell, 1910; Halictus claripes Friese, 1924; Halictus eyrei darwiniensis Cockerell, 1929

= Lasioglossum sphecodopse =

Species of bee

Lasioglossum sphecodopse, or Lasioglossum (Homalictus) sphecodopse, is a species of bee in the family Halictidae and subfamily Halictinae. It is endemic to Australia. It was described by British-American entomologist Theodore Dru Alison Cockerell in 1905.

== Description ==
Male body length is about 4 mm. Integumental colouration is mainly yellowish-green to bluish-green, with the abdomen and legs ferruginous.

== Distribution and habitat ==
The species occurs in tropical northern and north-eastern Australia. Type localities include Mackay, Queensland, and Darwin, Northern Territory.

== Behaviour ==
The adults are flying mellivores with sedentary larvae. Flowering plants visited by the bees include Angophora, Callistemon, Eucalyptus, Eugenia, Syncarpha, Hypochaeris, Jacksonia, Leptospermum, Melaleuca, Syncarpia, Tristaniopsis and Xanthorrhoea species.

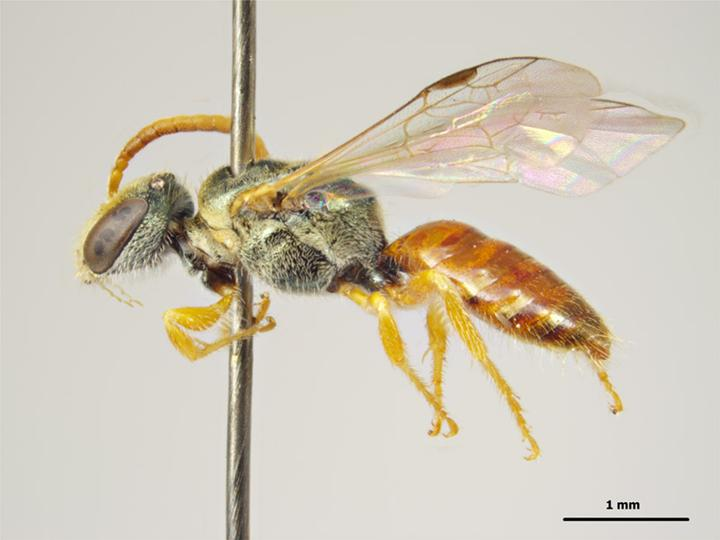
Male
