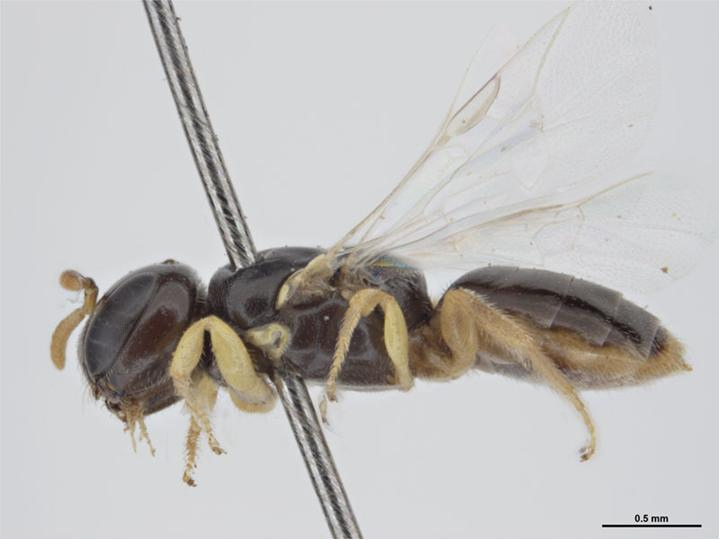
- Female

Scientific classification
- Kingdom: Animalia
- Phylum: Arthropoda
- Clade: Pancrustacea
- Class: Insecta
- Order: Hymenoptera
- Family: Colletidae
- Genus: Euryglossina
- Species: E. cockerelli

Binomial name
- Euryglossina cockerelli Perkins, 1912

Synonyms
- Euryglossina flaviventris personata Cockerell, 1929; Euryglossina semiflava Cockerell, 1929

= Euryglossina cockerelli =

Species of bee

Euryglossina cockerelli, or Euryglossina (Euryglossina) cockerelli, is a species of bee in the family Colletidae and the subfamily Euryglossinae. It is endemic to Australia. It was described in 1912 by English entomologist Robert Cyril Layton Perkins.

== Distribution and habitat ==
The species occurs in eastern Australia. Type localities include Brisbane and Bundaberg in Queensland.

== Behaviour ==
The adults are flying mellivores. Flowering plants visited by the bees include Angophora, Callistemon, Eucalyptus, Eugenia, Leptospermum, Melaleuca, Syncarpia and Tristania species.

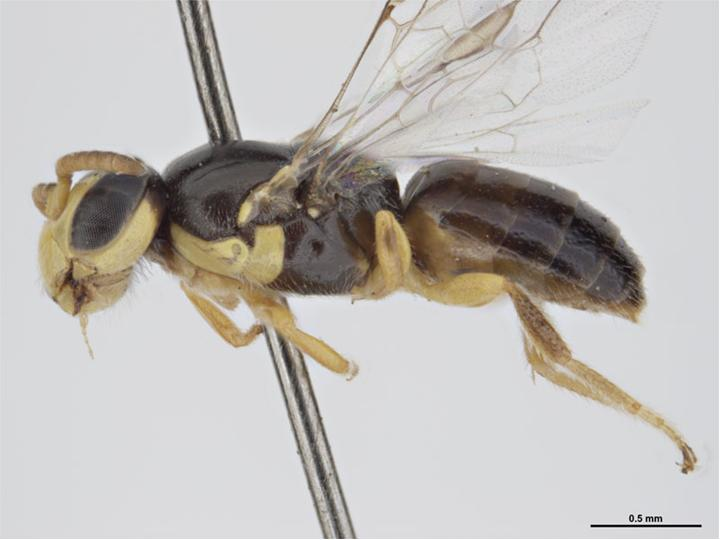
Male
