= Brush turpentine =

Brush turpentine is a common name for several Australian plants and may refer to:

- Choricarpia leptopetala
- Rhodamnia rubescens, native to Eastern Australia
