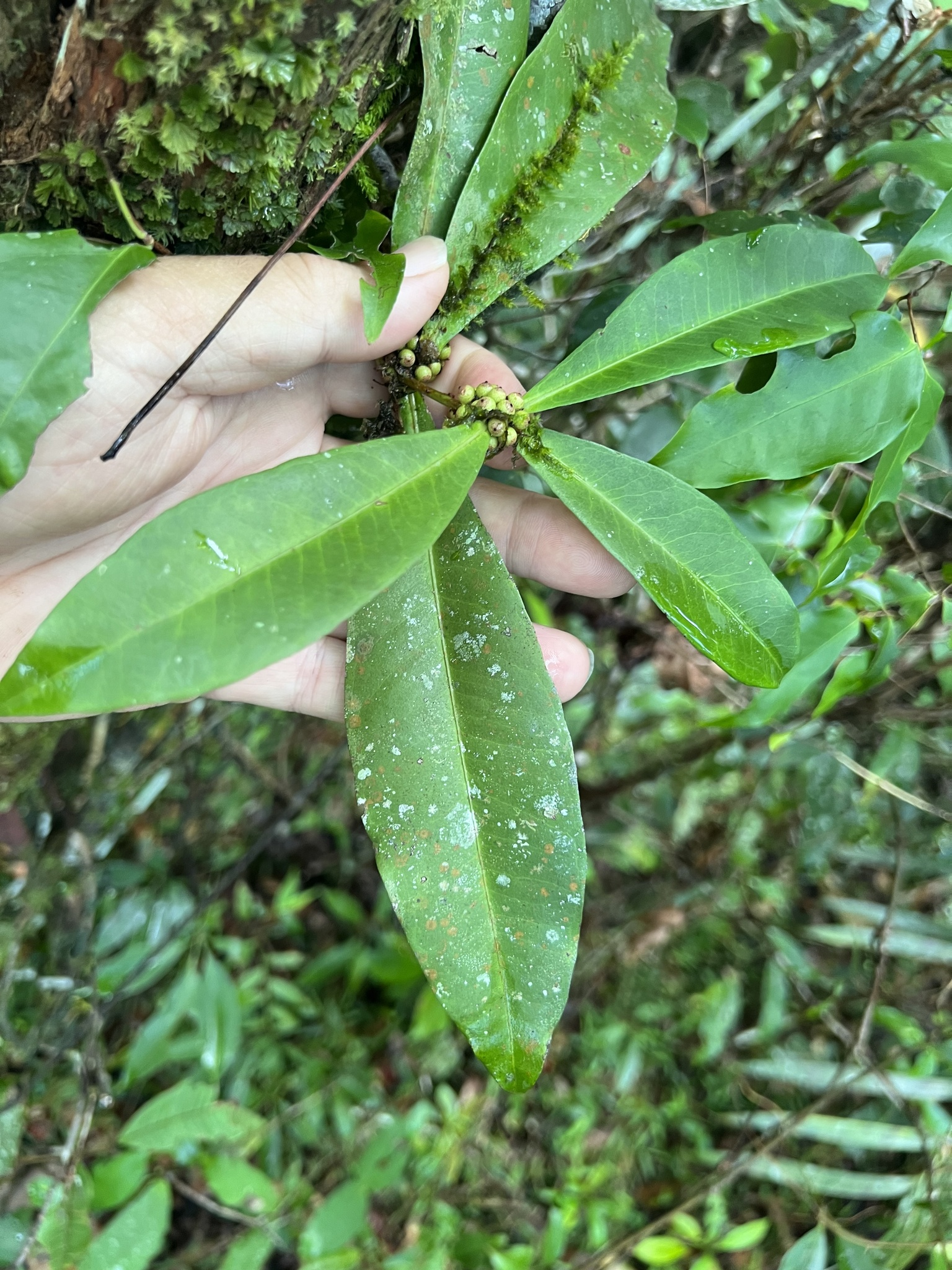

Conservation status
- Least Concern (IUCN 3.1)

Scientific classification
- Kingdom: Plantae
- Clade: Tracheophytes
- Clade: Angiosperms
- Clade: Eudicots
- Clade: Asterids
- Order: Ericales
- Family: Primulaceae
- Genus: Myrsine
- Species: M. subsessilis

Binomial name
- Myrsine subsessilis F.Muell.

Synonyms
- Rapanea subsessilis (F.Muell.) Mez

= Myrsine subsessilis =

Red muttonwood

Species of flowering plant

Myrsine subsessilis, commonly known as red muttonwood, is a plant in the family Primulaceae found only in coastal rainforests of New South Wales and Queensland, Australia.

== Description ==
Myrsine subsessilis is a shrub or small tree growing to about 5 m (16 ft) tall with brown or reddish bark. The leaves are arranged alternately on the twigs and may form closely spaced pseudo-whorls. They are held on reddish petioles 1–4 mm (0.04–0.16 in), with the colour extending into the midrib. The leaf blades may be elliptic to lanceolate and slightly asymmetrical, with about 19 lateral veins either side of the prominent midrib that curve upwards towards the leaf margin. They have entire margins, red or orange 'oil dots', and measure up to 17 cm (6.7 in) long by 6 cm (2.4 in) wide.

The inflorescences are produced on the older wood below the leaves and sometimes in the leaf axils, and are fascicles usually with up to 9 flowers, rarely up to 21. This species is dioecious, meaning that pistillate (functionally female) and staminate (functionally male) flowers are borne on separate plants. The flowers are pentamerous (with five petals, sepals, etc.), petals are about 3 mm (0.12 in) long and may be pale shades of green, cream, yellow, pink or brown. The fruit is a blue, purple or black drupe about 8 mm (0.31 in) long and 9 mm (0.35 in) wide, containing a single pale brown seed about 4 mm (0.16 in) long.

=== Phenology ===
Flowers have been collected in all months—activity is highest in the winter months and is associated with rain events. Fruit likewise occur throughout the year but with a peak during autumn and winter.

== Taxonomy ==
This plant was first described by the German-born Australian botanist Ferdinand von Mueller, based on material collected from the Clarence and Richmond Rivers in New South Wales, and from Moreton Bay in Queensland. Mueller published the description in volume 4 of his work Fragmenta phytographiæ Australiæ in 1864.

=== Subspecies/Infraspecies ===
Two subspecies are recognised — M. s. subsp. cryptostemon, described by Betsy R. Jackes in 2005 and which is found in northeastern Queensland; and the autonym M. s. subsp. subsessilis, which is found in northeastern New South Wales and southeastern Queensland.

=== Etymology ===
The specific epithet sessilis is from the Latin subsessil and refers to the very short petiole.

== Distribution and habitat ==
The two subspecies form disjunct populations on the east coast of Australia — the subspecies subsellis occurs from the Clarence River (about 29.4° S) to the Gympie area (about 25.9° S), while the subspecies cryptostemon occurs from the Paluma Range National Park (about 19.1° S) to the Kutini-Payamu National Park (formerly known as Iron Range N.P.) (about 12.6° S).

Throughout the two populations the species generally inhabits rainforest of varying types, on a wide range of soils from sand dunes to basalt. The altitudinal range is from sea level to about 1,300 m (4,300 ft).

== Conservation ==
As of September 2024, this species has been assessed to be of least concern by the International Union for Conservation of Nature (IUCN) and by the Queensland Government under its Nature Conservation Act.

== Gallery ==
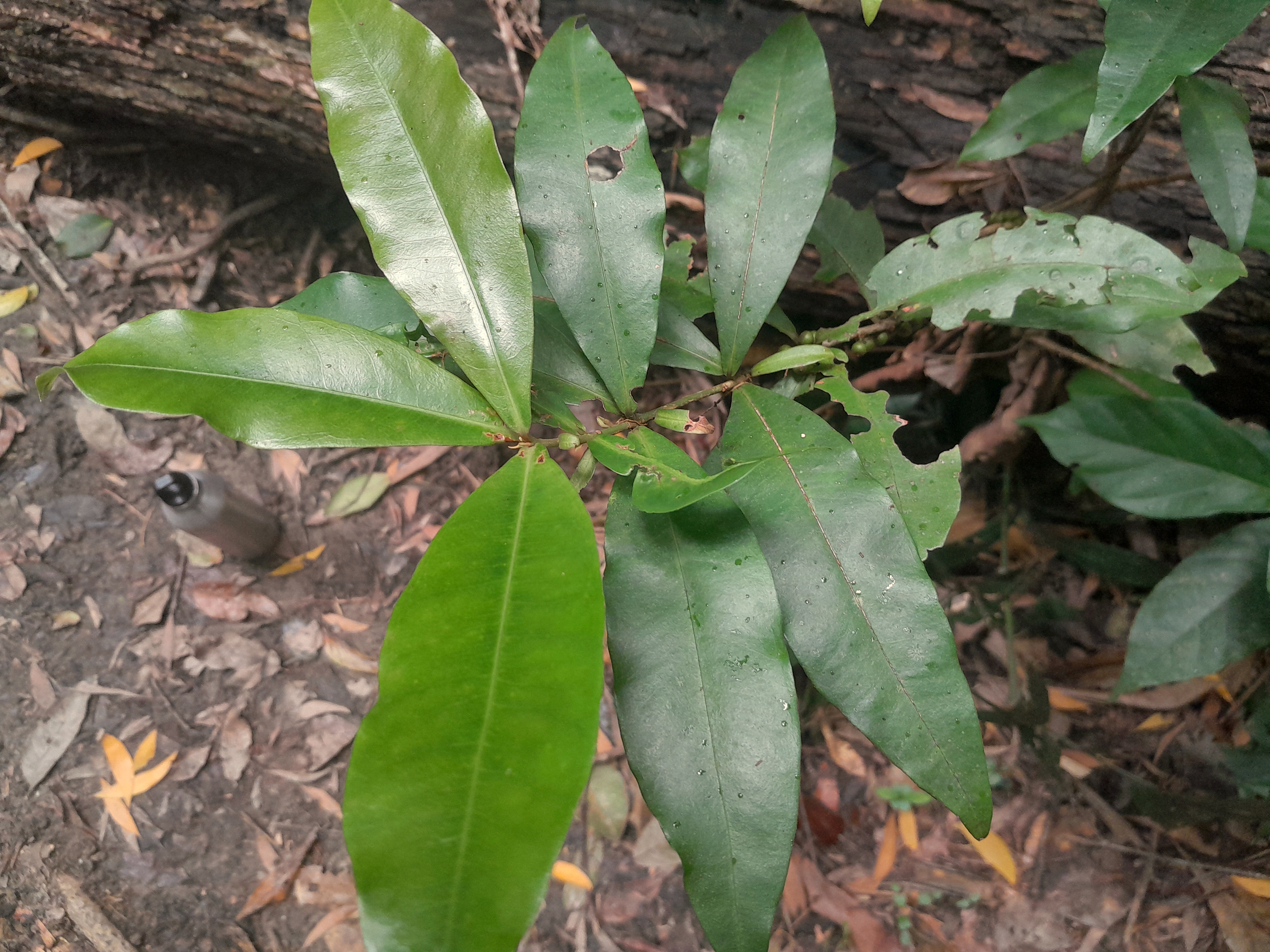
Foliage

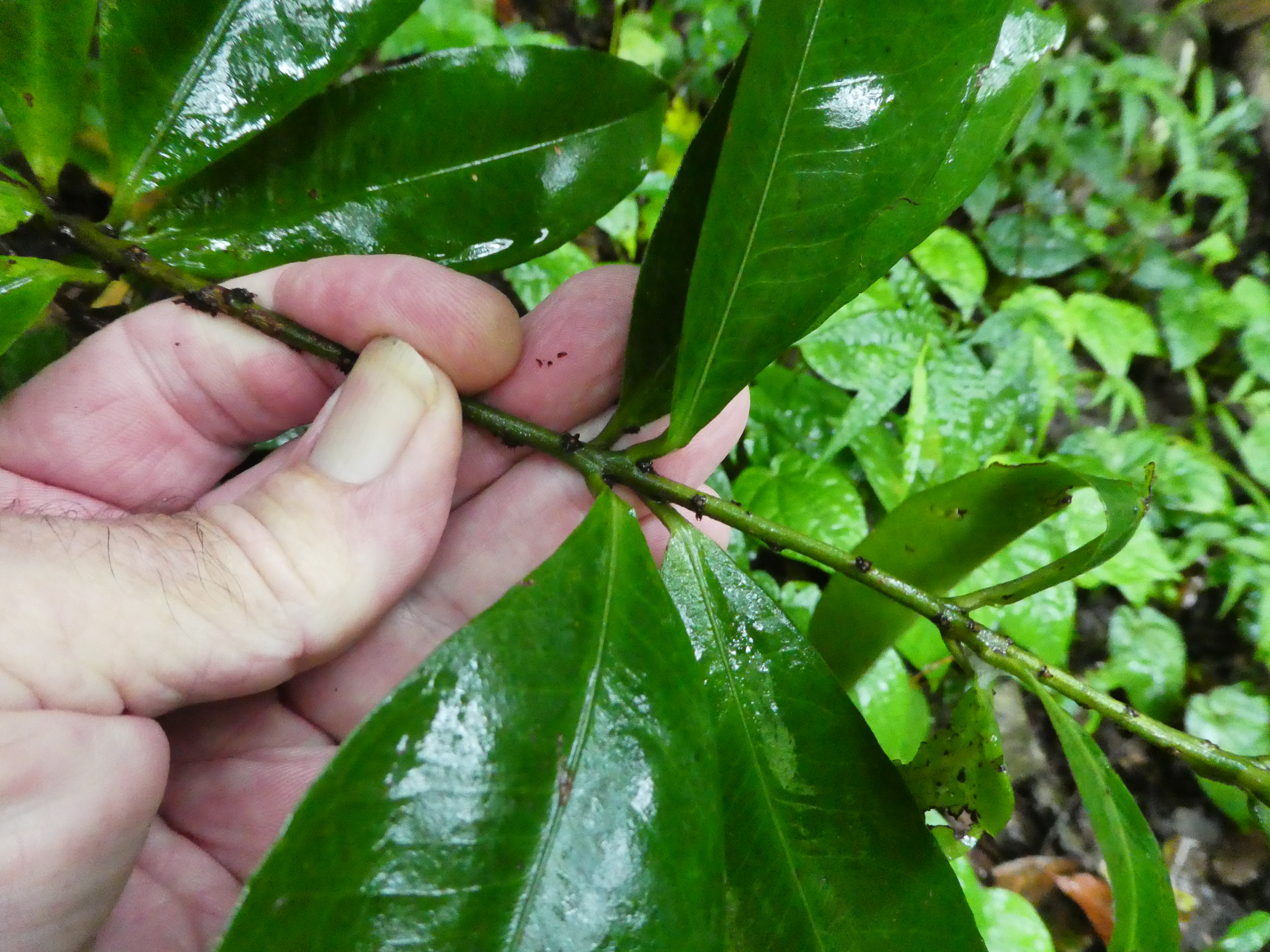
Foliage

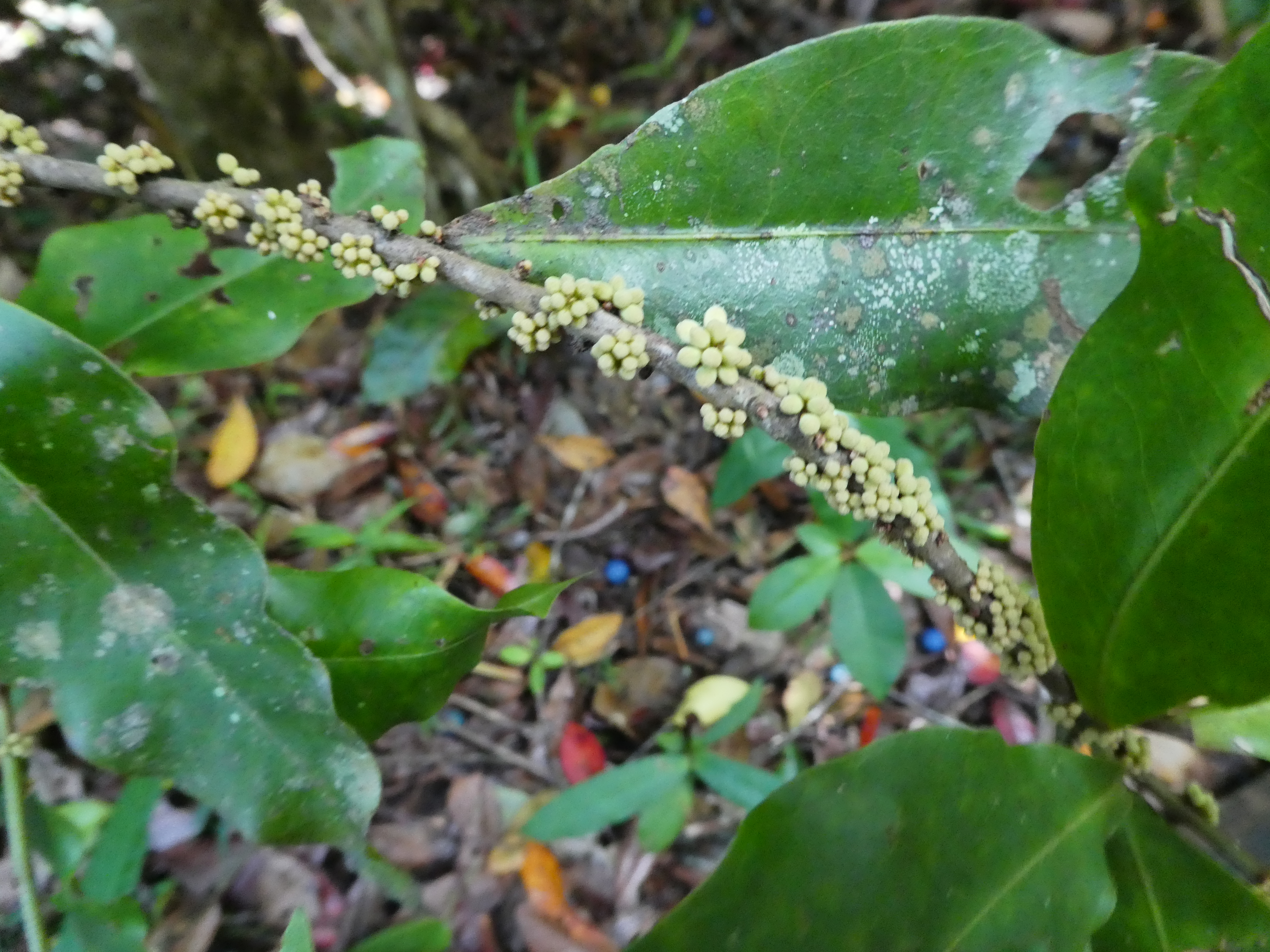
Flower buds

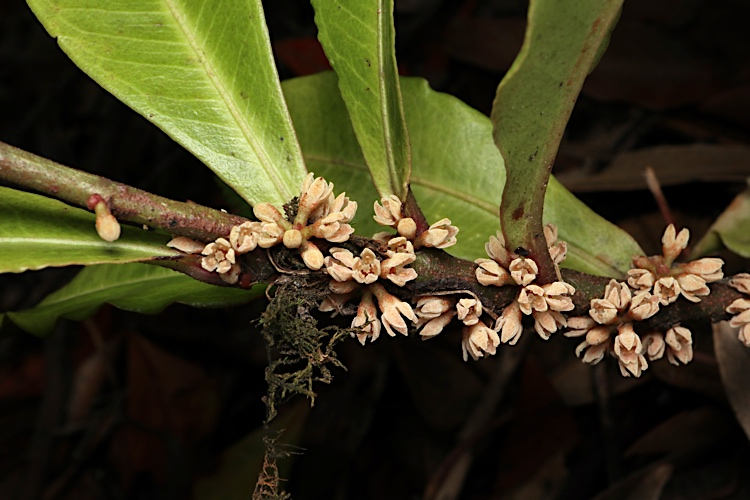
Flowers

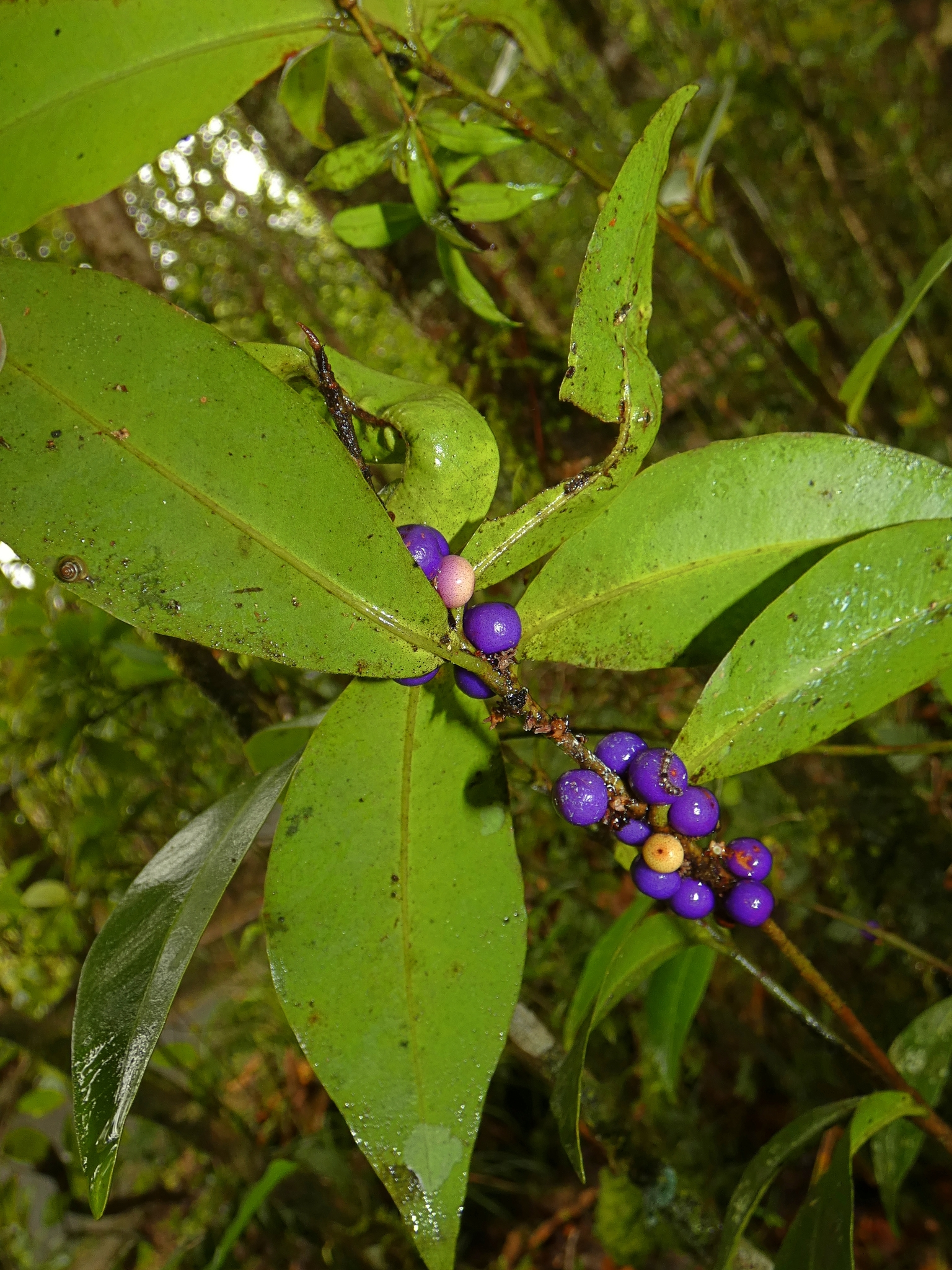
Ripe fruit
