= Synaphea quartzitica =

Conservation status
- Endangered (EPBC Act)

Scientific classification
- Kingdom: Plantae
- Clade: Tracheophytes
- Clade: Angiosperms
- Clade: Eudicots
- Order: Proteales
- Family: Proteaceae
- Genus: Synaphea
- Species: S. quartzitica

Binomial name
- Synaphea quartzitica A.S.George

Species of Australian shrub in the family Proteaceae

Synaphea quartzitica, also known as quartz-loving synaphea, is a species of flowering plant in the family Proteaceae and is endemic to a small area in the south west of Western Australia. It is a small, tufted shrub with several stems, lobed pinnatipartite leaves and spikes of yellow flowers.

== Description ==
Synaphea quartzitica is a small, tufted shrub or subshrub with several branched stems up to 7 cm (2.8 in) long with silky hairs, but covered by the leaf bases. The leaves are pinnatipartite with two or three pairs of lobes, 65–80 mm (2.6–3.1 in) long and 80–90 mm (3.1–3.5 in) wide on a petiole 60–180 mm (2.4–7.1 in) long. The primary lobes have three-parts 3–6 mm (0.12–0.24 in) wide, the end lobes triangular and sharply pointed. The flowers are yellow and borne in spikes 60–180 mm (2.4–7.1 in) long and about the same length as the leaves, on a branched, hairy, striated peduncle 20–100 mm (0.79–3.94 in) long. The bracts are ascending, 1–2 mm (0.039–0.079 in) long and broad. The perianth is spreading with a moderately wide opening, the upper tepal 4.5–5.0 mm (0.18–0.20 in) long and 1.5–2.0 mm (0.059–0.079 in) wide and strongly curved, the lower tepal 2.5–3.5 mm (0.098–0.138 in) long. The stigma is narrowly oblong and notched, 0.8–1.0 mm (0.031–0.039 in) long and 0.3–0.4 mm (0.012–0.016 in) wide, thick, straight to slightly s-shaped and the ovary is covered with soft hairs. Flowering occurs in July and August, and the fruit is narrowly oval, 4 mm (0.16 in) long and covered with soft hairs.

== Taxonomy ==
Synaphea quartzitica was first formally described in 1995 by Alex George in the Flora of Australia from specimens he found north of Moora in 1993. The specific epithet (quartzitica) refers to the rock type on which the species is found.

== Distribution and habitat ==
Quartz-loving synaphea is only known from four populations containg a total of less than 350 plants, growing on chert hills in open heath with Melaleuca radula and Kunzea species in the Moora-Watheroo area, in the Avon Wheatbelt and Geraldton Sandplains bioregions of Western Australia.

== Conservation status ==
Synaphea quartzitica is listed as "endangered" under the Australian Government Environment Protection and Biodiversity Conservation Act 1999 and as "threatened" under the Western Australian Government Biodiversity Conservation Act 2016.
