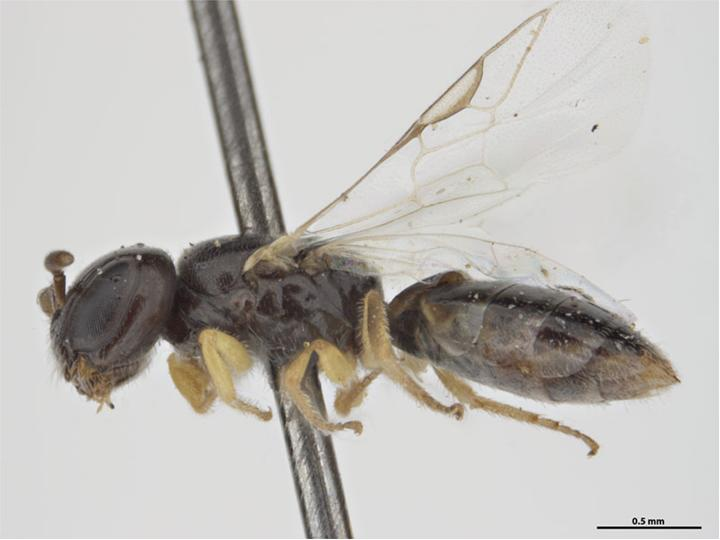
- Female

Scientific classification
- Kingdom: Animalia
- Phylum: Arthropoda
- Clade: Pancrustacea
- Class: Insecta
- Order: Hymenoptera
- Family: Colletidae
- Genus: Euryglossina
- Species: E. melanocephala

Binomial name
- Euryglossina melanocephala Exley, 1968

Synonyms
- Euryglossina (Turnerella) melanocephala Exley, 1968

= Euryglossina melanocephala =

Species of bee

Euryglossina melanocephala, or Euryglossina (Euryglossina) melanocephala, is a species of bee in the family Colletidae and the subfamily Euryglossinae. It is endemic to Australia. It was described in 1968 by Australian entomologist Elizabeth Exley.

== Distribution and habitat ==
The species occurs across mainland Australia. The type locality is Greenmount, Western Australia.

== Behaviour ==
The adults are flying mellivores. Flowering plants visited by the bees include Angophora, Callistemon, Eucalyptus, Leptospermum, Melaleuca, Syncarpia and Tristania species.
