= Zieria vagans =

Gurgeena stink bush

Conservation status
- Critically Endangered (NCA)

Scientific classification
- Kingdom: Plantae
- Clade: Tracheophytes
- Clade: Angiosperms
- Clade: Eudicots
- Clade: Rosids
- Order: Sapindales
- Family: Rutaceae
- Genus: Zieria
- Species: Z. vagans

Binomial name
- Zieria vagans Duretto & P.I.Forst.

Species of flowering plant

Zieria vagans, commonly known as Gurgeena stink bush, is a plant in the citrus family Rutaceae and endemic to a small area near Binjour in south-eastern Queensland. It is an open, straggly shrub with densely hairy branches, three-part leaves and groups of up to fifteen flowers with four creamy-white petals and four stamens.

== Description ==
Zieria vagans is an open, straggly shrub which grows to a height of 2 m (7 ft) and has thin branches covered with soft hairs when young. The leaves are composed of three narrow elliptic leaflets, the central leaflet 32–45 mm (1–2 in) long and 3–6 mm (0.1–0.2 in) wide. The leaves have a petiole 5–13 mm (0.2–0.5 in) long. The lower surface of the leaflets is more or less glabrous and the upper surface is rough and has a dense covering of hairs. The flowers are arranged in groups of three to fifteen in leaf axils, the groups shorter than the leaves. The groups are on a hairy stalk 5–13 mm (0.2–0.5 in) long. The flowers are surrounded by scale-like bracts 1–6 mm (0.04–0.2 in) long which remain during flowering. The sepals are triangular, about 1 mm (0.04 in) long and wide and the four petals are creamy white, elliptic in shape, about 2 mm (0.08 in) long, 1–1.5 mm (0.04–0.06 in) wide and hairy on both surfaces. There are four stamens. Flowering occurs between August and February and is followed by fruits which are more or less glabrous capsules about 4 mm (0.2 in) long and 2 mm (0.08 in) wide.

== Taxonomy and naming ==
Zieria vagans was first formally described in 2007 by Marco Duretto and Paul Irwin Forster from a specimen collected in a state forest near Binjour and the description was published in Austrobaileya. The specific epithet (vagans) is a Latin word meaning "wandering" or "unsettled", referring to some populations of this species growing between woodland and vine thicket.

== Distribution and habitat ==
Gurgeena stink bush is only known from the Gurgeena Plateau near Binjour in the Brigalow Belt bioregions where it grows in or near vine thicket dominated by Backhousia kingii.

== Conservation status ==
Zieria vagans is classified as "critically endangered" under the Queensland Government Nature Conservation Act 1992.
