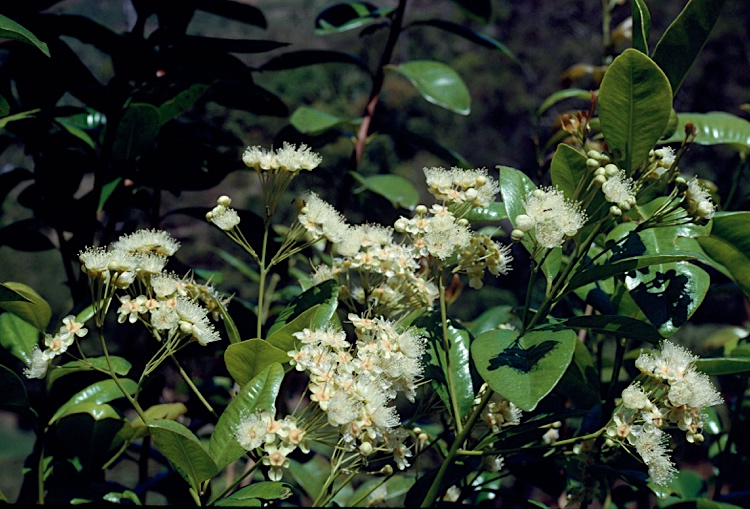
- Flowers of Backhousia hughesii

Conservation status
- Critically Endangered (NCA)

Scientific classification
- Kingdom: Plantae
- Clade: Tracheophytes
- Clade: Angiosperms
- Clade: Eudicots
- Clade: Rosids
- Order: Myrtales
- Family: Myrtaceae
- Genus: Backhousia
- Species: B. hughesii

Binomial name
- Backhousia hughesii C.T.White

= Backhousia hughesii =

Species of plant

Backhousia hughesii, the grey teak, is a species of tree in the family Myrtaceae. It is endemic to the Wet Tropics of northeast Queensland.

== Description ==
It can grow up to 35 metres in height. It flowers from February to July and fruits in February. It has white & cream coloured flowers and a capsule or samara fruit structure.

== Conservation ==
It has been assessed as Critically Endangered under the Nature Conservation Act 1992.
