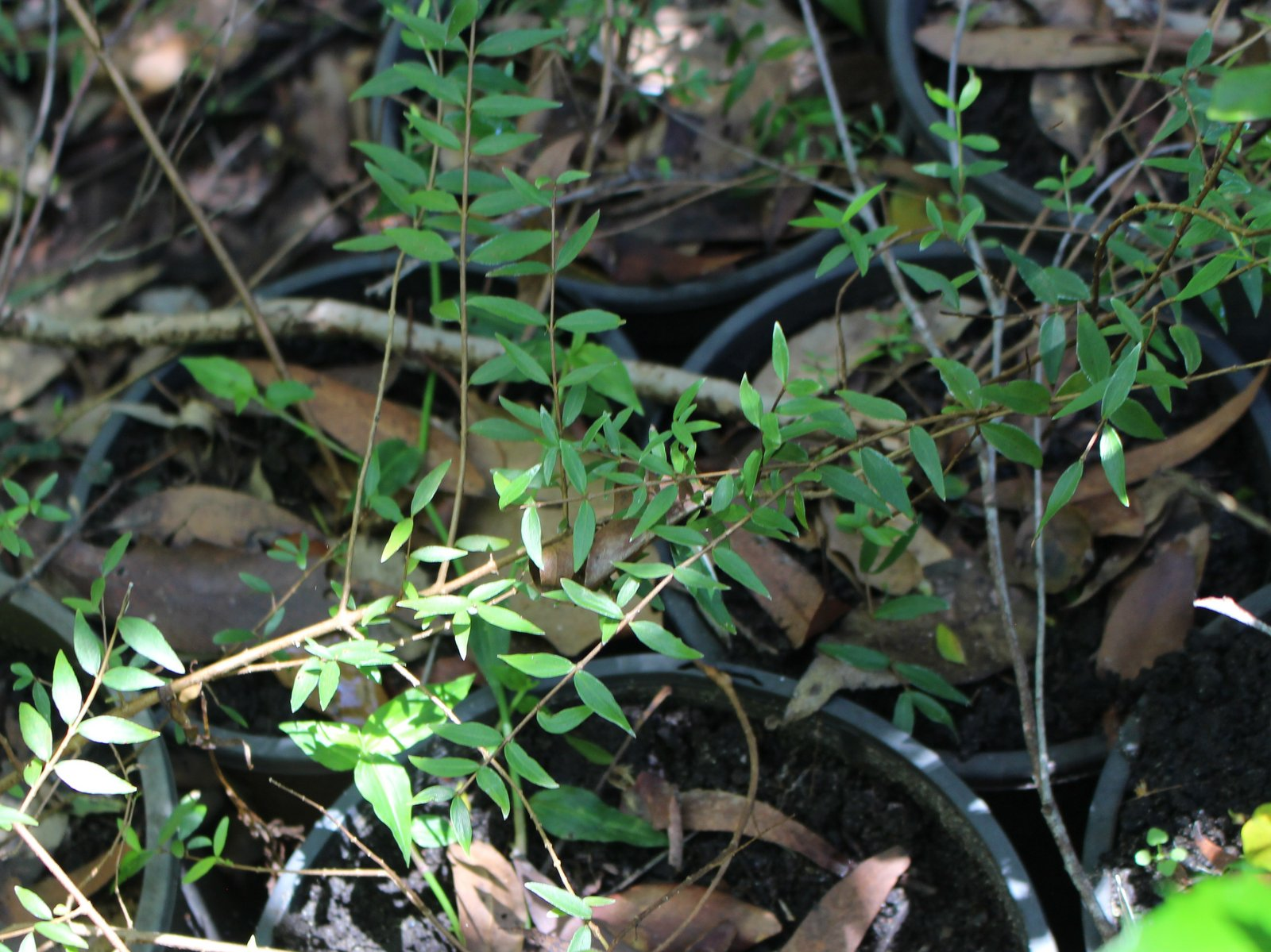

Conservation status
- Critically Endangered (NCA)

Scientific classification
- Kingdom: Plantae
- Clade: Tracheophytes
- Clade: Angiosperms
- Clade: Eudicots
- Clade: Rosids
- Order: Myrtales
- Family: Myrtaceae
- Genus: Backhousia
- Species: B. oligantha

Binomial name
- Backhousia oligantha A.R.Bean

= Backhousia oligantha =

Species of plant in the myrtle family

Backhousia oligantha, commonly known Stony Creek backhousia, is a rare and critically endangered species of plant in the family Myrtaceae. This species is endemic to South-East Queensland and Central Queensland. The small tree has an unusual growth habit, with colonies of many prostrate shoots and many stems from one genotype. At the type location, there are 100 to 200 stems in six clumps, possibly with only six unique individuals. The epithet oligantha is derived from the Greek language, meaning 'few flowers'.

== Distribution and habitat ==
Backhousia oligantha mostly confined to the areas of Biggenden with an outlier population located on Mount Archer in Rockhampton. The Biggenden population grows in three separate sublocations where one occurs in Mount Walsh National Park, one at Mount Biggenden, and one East of Didcot, Queensland, near Degilbo Timber Reserve 1.

This species occurs in Araucarian (Araucaria cunninghamii) microphyll vine-forest. This species associated with Backhousia oligantha include Alectryon diversifolius, Canthium odoratum, and Gossia bidwillii

== Phenology ==
Flowering has been observed in November with fruiting occurring in February.

== Conservation status ==
Backhousia oligantha is listed as "critically endangered" under the Queensland Nature Conservation Act 1992. It is not listed under the Australian Environment Protection and Biodiversity Conservation Act 1999. In 2021, Backhousia oligantha status was changed from endangered to critically endangered.
