= Backhousia enata =

Scientific classification
- Kingdom: Plantae
- Clade: Tracheophytes
- Clade: Angiosperms
- Clade: Eudicots
- Clade: Rosids
- Order: Myrtales
- Family: Myrtaceae
- Genus: Backhousia
- Species: B. enata

Binomial name
- Backhousia enata A.J.Ford, Craven & J.Holmes (2005)

Synonyms
- Tully River

Species of flowering plant

Backhousia enata is a flowering plant in the family Myrtaceae, native to Northeastern Queensland.

It is a multi-stemmed large shrub or tree with rough grey-brown bark on the main trunk. The leaves are glossy and can have a strong aroma that can be described as a menthol smell. It has white flowers arranged in groups of three to six individual flowers.
