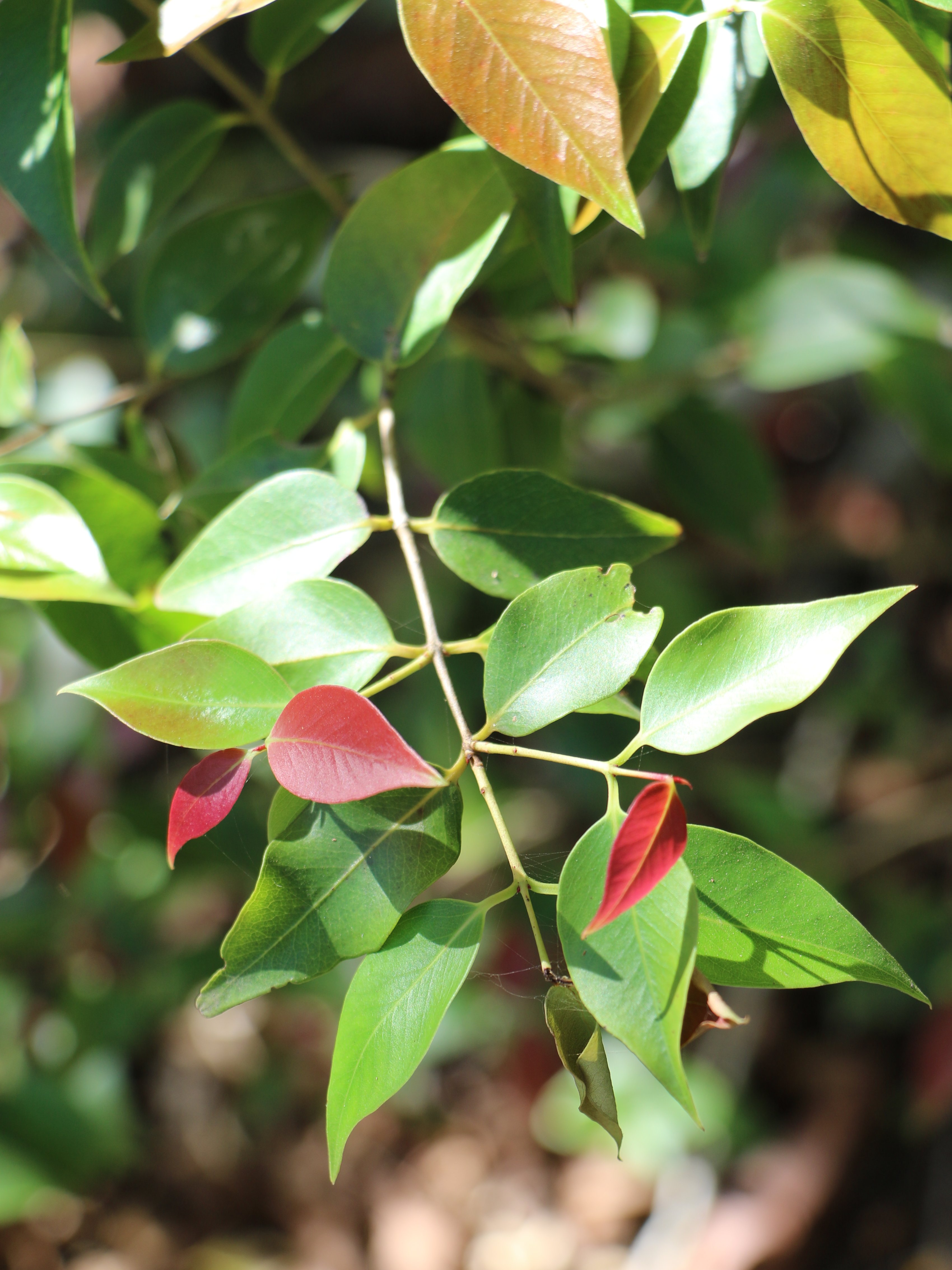

Conservation status
- Critically endangered (EPBC Act)

Scientific classification
- Kingdom: Plantae
- Clade: Tracheophytes
- Clade: Angiosperms
- Clade: Eudicots
- Clade: Rosids
- Order: Myrtales
- Family: Myrtaceae
- Genus: Backhousia
- Species: B. tetraptera

Binomial name
- Backhousia tetraptera Jackes

= Backhousia tetraptera =

Species of plant in the myrtle family

Backhousia tetraptera is a tree in the family Myrtaceae. The only known population occurs at the foot of Mount Stuart near Townsville in Queensland, Australia.

The species grows to between 5 and 12 metres (16 and 39 ft) high often with multiple trunks that have a mottled flaking bark including grey, grey-brown and/or pink colouration. The leaves are simple and opposite and are 5.5 to 9 cm (2.2 to 3.5 in) long and 1.5 to 3.8 cm (0.6 to 1.5 in) wide. The white flowers appear in clusters of 10 and have 56 to 65 stamens. Flowering is induced by the first significant rainfall of the wet season, appearing four weeks later. The distinctive fruits are capsules with four wings that appear in clusters and fade from pink to white and dry to brown.

The species was formally described in 2012. As of September 2024 it was designated critically endangered under the EPBC Act.
