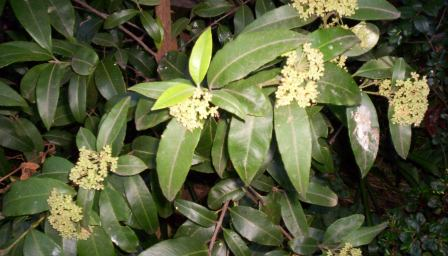
- Backhousia citriodora foliage and flowers

Scientific classification
- Kingdom: Plantae
- Clade: Embryophytes
- Clade: Tracheophytes
- Clade: Spermatophytes
- Clade: Angiosperms
- Clade: Eudicots
- Clade: Rosids
- Order: Myrtales
- Family: Myrtaceae
- Subfamily: Myrtoideae
- Tribe: Backhousieae
- Genus: Backhousia; Hook. & Harv.

Synonyms
- Choricarpia

= Backhousia =

Genus of flowering plants

Backhousia is a genus of thirteen currently known species of flowering plants in the family Myrtaceae. All the currently known species are endemic to Australia in the rainforests and seasonally dry forests of Queensland, New South Wales and Western Australia.

In 1845 in the European science publication the Botanical Magazine William Jackson Hooker and William Henry Harvey first published this genus's formal description and name, after botanist James Backhouse from England and Australia.

They grow to aromatic shrubs or trees from 5 to 25 m (20 to 80 ft) tall, with leaves 3–12 cm (1.2–4.7 in) long and 1–6 cm (0.4–2.4 in) wide, arranged opposite to each other.

== Species ==
Sourced from the authoritative Australian Plant Name Index and Australian Plant Census as of June 2014. For taxa including undescribed species further afield outside Australia, for example likely in New Guinea, this list lacks them—refer also to the genus Kania.

- Backhousia angustifolia F.Muell., curry myrtle, narrow leaf myrtle
- Backhousia bancroftii F.M.Bailey, Johnstone River hardwood
- Backhousia citriodora F.Muell., lemon scented myrtle, sweet verbena tree, lemon scented verbena, lemon ironwood
- Backhousia enata A.J.Ford, Craven & J.Holmes
- Backhousia gundarara M.D.Barrett, Craven & R.L.Barrett; formerly Backhousia sp. Prince Regent (W.O'Sullivan & D.Dureau WODD 42) WA Herbarium
- Backhousia hughesii C.T.White, stony backhousia, stonewood, lime wood, grey teak
- Backhousia kingii Guymer
- Backhousia leptopetala (F.Muell.) M.G.Harr., former name: Choricarpia leptopetala (F.Muell.) Domin, brush turpentine, brown myrtle
- Backhousia myrtifolia Hook. & Harv., grey myrtle, carrol, ironwood, neverbreak, iron myrtle, cinnamon myrtle
- Backhousia oligantha A.R.Bean
- Backhousia sciadophora F.Muell., shatterwood, ironwood, boomerang tree
- Backhousia subargentea (C.T.White) M.G.Harr., former name: Choricarpia subargentea (C.T.White) L.A.S.Johnson, giant ironwood, scrub ironwood, lancewood, ironwood box
- Backhousia tetraptera Jackes

Formerly included here

- Backhousia anisata was transferred to Anetholea anisata, and later to Syzygium anisatum.
