= Acacia jackesiana =

Betsy's wattle

Scientific classification
- Kingdom: Plantae
- Clade: Embryophytes
- Clade: Tracheophytes
- Clade: Spermatophytes
- Clade: Angiosperms
- Clade: Eudicots
- Clade: Rosids
- Order: Fabales
- Family: Fabaceae
- Subfamily: Caesalpinioideae
- Clade: Mimosoid clade
- Genus: Acacia
- Species: A. jackesiana

Binomial name
- Acacia jackesiana Pedley
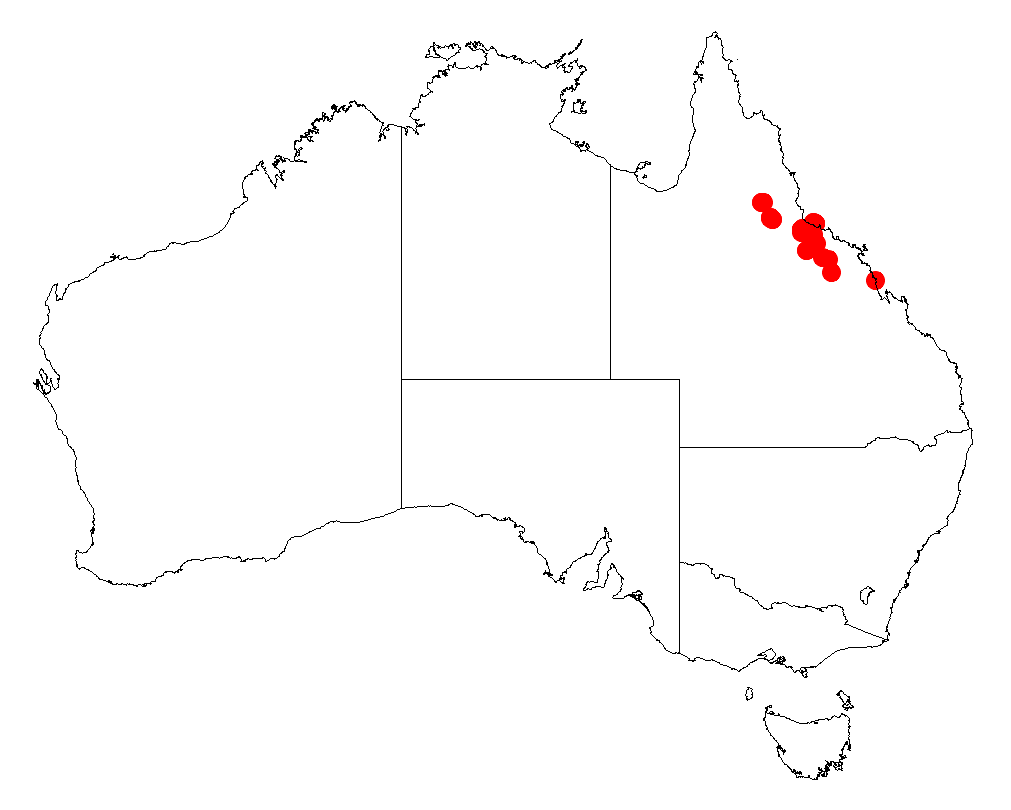
- Occurrence data from AVH

Synonyms
- Racosperma jackesianum (Pedley) Pedley

Species of legume

Acacia jackesiana, also known as Betsy's wattle, is a species of flowering plant in the family Fabaceae and is endemic to Queensland, Australia. It is a prostrate shrub with terete phyllodes, spikes of golden yellow flowers and linear, tapered, more or less woody pods rounded over the seeds.

== Description ==
Acacia jackesiana is prostrate or low-lying shrub that typically grows to a height of 1 m (3 ft 3 in) and has red-brown angular branchlets that are scaly and resinous near the end. The phyllodes are terete or four-sided in cross-section, 90–140 mm (3.5–5.5 in) long and 0.8–1.0 mm (0.031–0.039 in) wide, covered with minute scales with one prominent vein at each angle and a small gland near the base. The flowers are well-spaced and borne in spikes 12–22 mm (0.47–0.87 in) long. Flowering has been recorded in July and October and the pods are linear, tapered at both ends, 60–105 mm (2.4–4.1 in) long, about 8 mm (0.31 in) wide, subwoody and glabrous.

== Taxonomy ==
Acacia jackesiana was first formally described in 1978 by Leslie Pedley from specimens collected in 1976 near the Argentine Mine 60 km (37 mi) west-south-west of Townsville by Betsy Jackes and her husband, E. Machael Jackes (1935-2016).

== Distribution and habitat ==
This species of wattle occurs in the Undara Volcanic National Park, around Townsville, including on Magnetic Island, and in the Burdekin River and Leichhardt Range areas of north-eastern Queensland. It often grows on plains and in gorges in brown loamy soils overlying Argentine schist bedrock in Eucalyptus woodland.

== Conservation status ==
Acacia jackesiana is listed as 'least concern' under the Queensland Government Nature Conservation Act 1992.

== See also ==
- List of Acacia species
