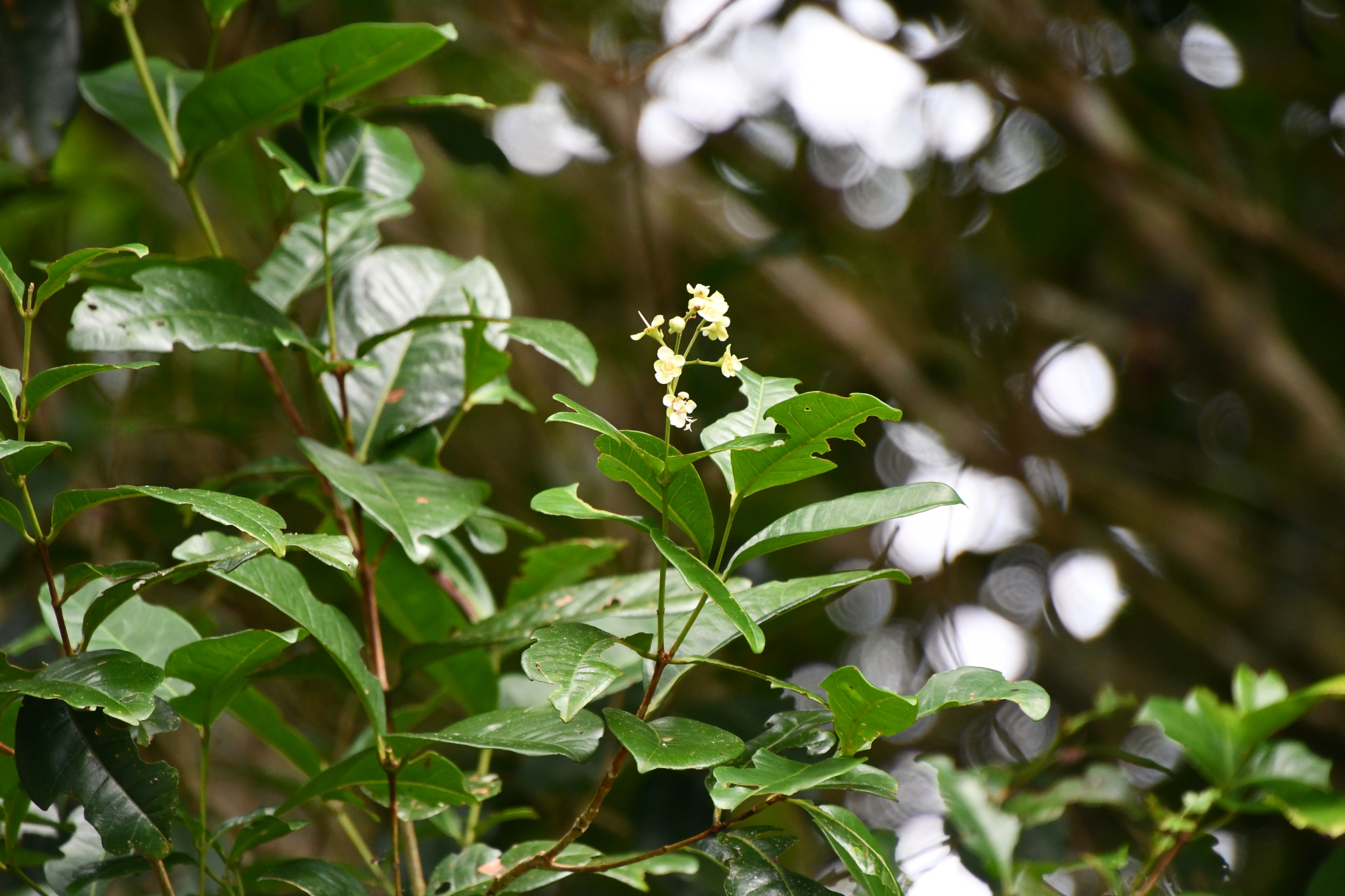
- In Wooroonooran National Park

Conservation status
- Least Concern (NCA)

Scientific classification
- Kingdom: Plantae
- Clade: Tracheophytes
- Clade: Angiosperms
- Clade: Eudicots
- Clade: Rosids
- Order: Myrtales
- Family: Myrtaceae
- Genus: Backhousia
- Species: B. bancroftii

Binomial name
- Backhousia bancroftii F.M.Bailey

= Backhousia bancroftii =

Johnstone River Hardwood

Species of plant

Backhousia bancroftii is a species of tree in the family Myrtaceae. It is endemic to Queensland.

== Description ==
It can grow up to 33 metres in height. It flowers from April to November and fruits from September to January. It has a capsule or samara fruit structure.

== Habitat and distribution ==
It is a rainforest tree, with a range extending from around Cooktown to Innisfail in the Wet Tropics of northeast Queensland.

== Conservation ==
It has been assessed as Least Concern under the Nature Conservation Act 1992.
