= Backhousia gundarara =

Conservation status
- Priority Two — Poorly Known Taxa (DEC)

Scientific classification
- Kingdom: Plantae
- Clade: Tracheophytes
- Clade: Angiosperms
- Clade: Eudicots
- Clade: Rosids
- Order: Myrtales
- Family: Myrtaceae
- Genus: Backhousia
- Species: B. gundarara

Binomial name
- Backhousia gundarara M.D.Barrett, Craven & R.L.Barrett

Species of tree

Backhousia gundarara is a tree in the family Myrtaceae. The only known population occurs in the Kimberley region in Western Australia.
