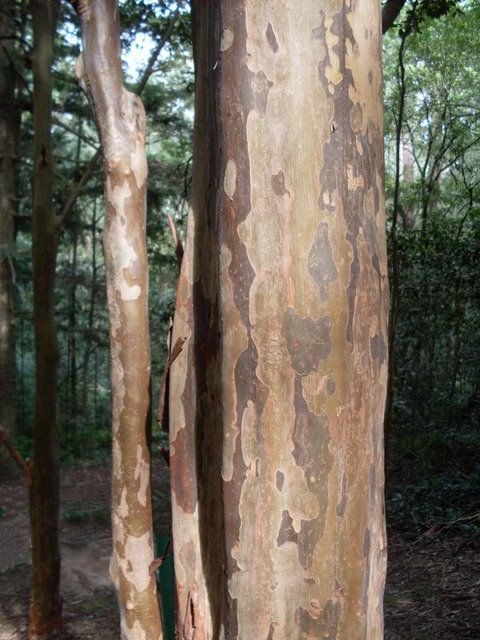

Conservation status
- Data Deficient (IUCN 3.1)

- Endangered (EPBC Act)

Scientific classification
- Kingdom: Plantae
- Clade: Tracheophytes
- Clade: Angiosperms
- Clade: Eudicots
- Clade: Rosids
- Order: Myrtales
- Family: Myrtaceae
- Genus: Backhousia
- Species: B. subargentea

Binomial name
- Backhousia subargentea (C.T.White) M.G.Harr.

Synonyms
- Choricarpia subargentea (C.T.White) L.A.S.Johnson; Syncarpia subargentea C.T.White

= Backhousia subargentea =

Species of tree

Backhousia subargentea (syn. Choricarpia subargentea) is a rare Australian rainforest tree, growing near Mullumbimby in northeastern New South Wales and from Boonah to Imbil in southeastern Queensland.

Common names include giant ironwood, ironwood box, scrub ironwood and lancewood. The New South Wales habitat of Backhousia subargentea is dry rainforest thickets on hillsides near Mullumbimby. It grows in association with the shatterwood and wild quince.

== Description ==
Backhousia subargentea is a small to medium tree, occasionally reaching 30 metres in height. However, it is much smaller in New South Wales, reaching only 8 m high and with a stem diameter of 20 cm. The trunk is often multi-stemmed and crooked, not cylindrical in cross-section, with some buttressing at the base.

The trunk can be smooth and glossy, of an attractive orange-brown or pinkish mauve colour, or green where bark has recently been shed. At other times, the bark sheds irregularly resulting in a mottled trunk, similar to the spotted gum and the leopardwood.

The leaves are opposite, simple and entire, lanceolate or broad with a fine leaf tip, around 4 to 8 cm long. The leaves are glossy dark green above, and greyish fawn below. Crushed leaves have a familiar eucalyptus scent. (Both plants being dry fruited myrtles). Oil dots are evident when viewed with a magnifying glass. The midrib and lateral leaf venation is only visible on the top surface. An intramarginal vein surrounds the leaf, about 2 mm from the edge. Leaf stalks are 5 to 10 mm long, with scaly matter on the stalk.

Flowers are white, densely together in globular heads, 5 to 8 mm long, appearing in April. The fruit matures around six months later as a small dry capsule, 5 mm in diameter on a stalk 6 to 10 mm long.

== Uses ==
If not so rare, it could possibly be used as an ornamental tree.
