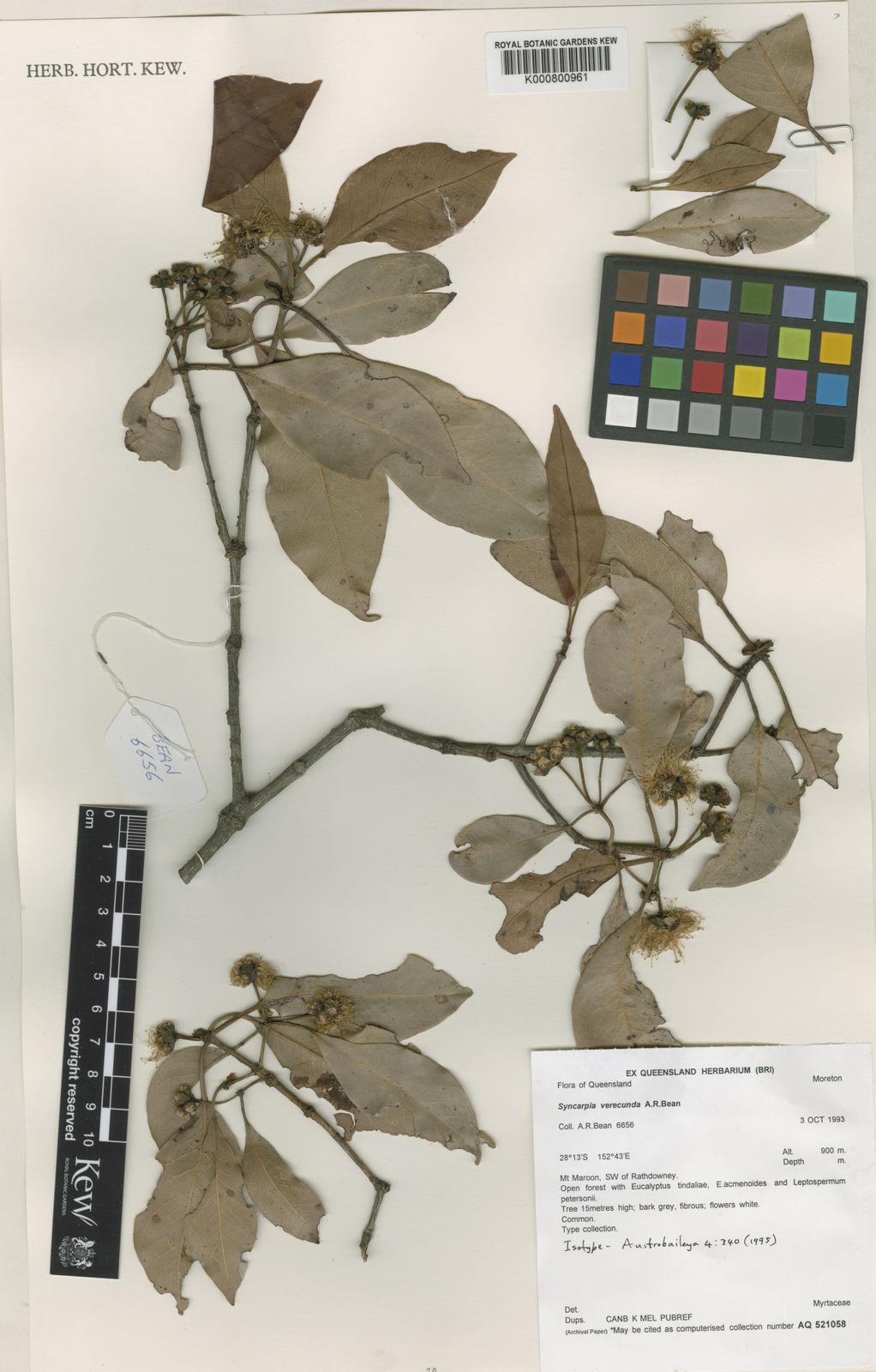
- Type specimen collected at Mt Maroon

Conservation status
- Least Concern (NCA)

Scientific classification
- Kingdom: Plantae
- Clade: Embryophytes
- Clade: Tracheophytes
- Clade: Spermatophytes
- Clade: Angiosperms
- Clade: Eudicots
- Clade: Rosids
- Order: Myrtales
- Family: Myrtaceae
- Genus: Syncarpia
- Species: S. verecunda

Binomial name
- Syncarpia verecunda A.R.Bean

= Syncarpia verecunda =

Species of plant

Syncarpia verecunda is a species of tree in the family Myrtaceae. It is endemic to Queensland, Australia.

== Conservation ==
In Queensland, under the Nature Conservation Act 1992, it is regarded as Least Concern.
