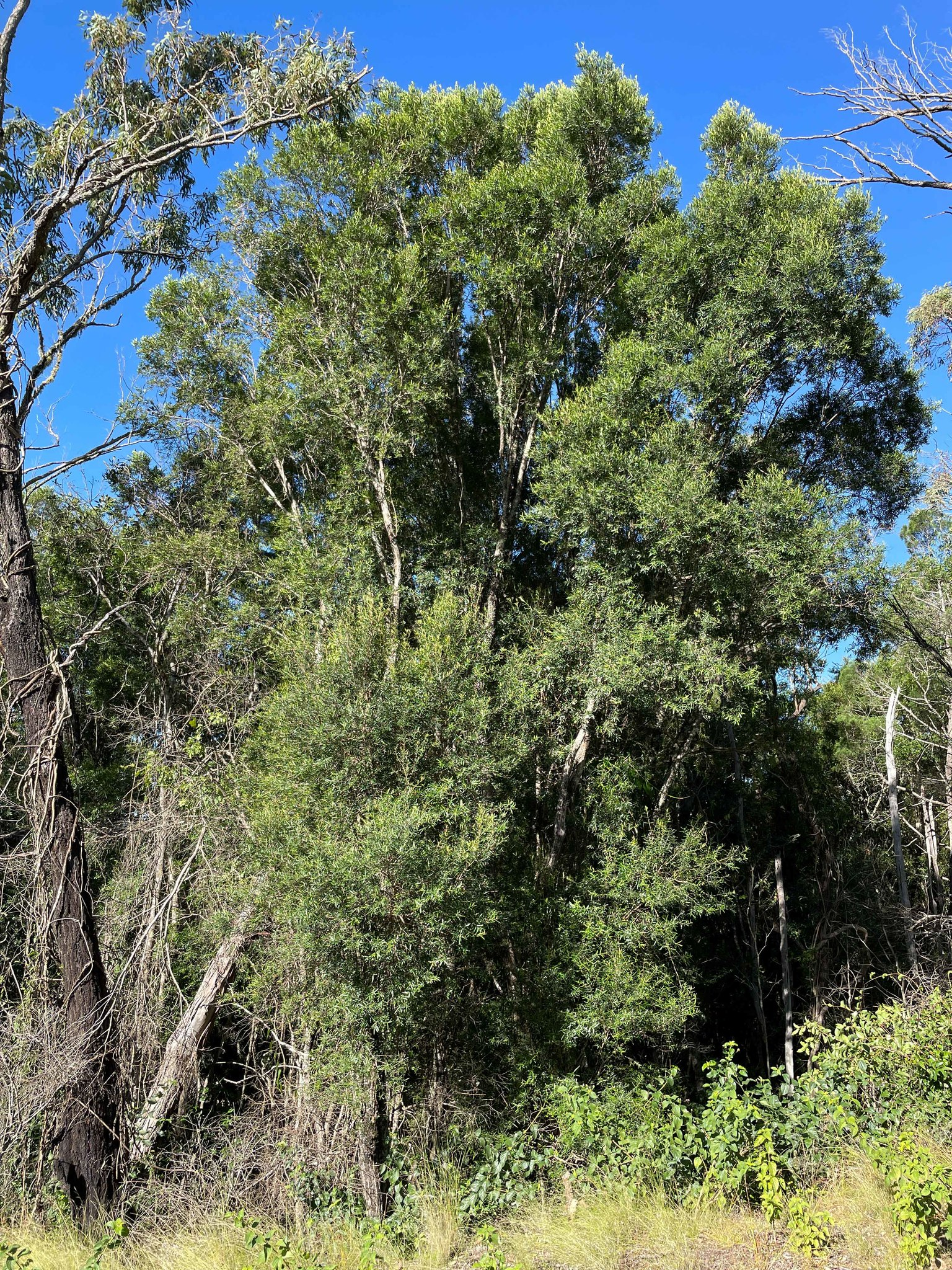
- Tree in the Bunya Mountains

Conservation status
- Least Concern (NCA)

Scientific classification
- Kingdom: Plantae
- Clade: Embryophytes
- Clade: Tracheophytes
- Clade: Spermatophytes
- Clade: Angiosperms
- Clade: Eudicots
- Clade: Rosids
- Order: Myrtales
- Family: Myrtaceae
- Genus: Backhousia
- Species: B. angustifolia

Binomial name
- Backhousia angustifolia F.Muell.

= Backhousia angustifolia =

Species of tree

Backhousia angustifolia, the narrow leaf myrtle, is a shrub or tree in the family Myrtaceae in Australia.. It is found primarily in south-central Queensland with vagrant populations extending into North Queensland and New South Wales.

== Description ==
As a tree it is capable of growing up to 15 metres tall. It flowers from November to July and fruits in January and February. It has a narrowly elliptical or ovate leaf shape. It has a capsule, nut or samara fruit structure, with a flattened ovoid seed shape.

== Conservation ==
It has been assessed as Least Concern under the Nature Conservation Act 1992.
