= Bulbophyllum cavibulbum =

Scientific classification
- Kingdom: Plantae
- Clade: Tracheophytes
- Clade: Angiosperms
- Clade: Monocots
- Order: Asparagales
- Family: Orchidaceae
- Subfamily: Epidendroideae
- Genus: Bulbophyllum
- Species: B. cavibulbum

Binomial name
- Bulbophyllum cavibulbum J.J.Sm. 1929

Species of orchid

Bulbophyllum cavibulbum is a species of orchid in the genus Bulbophyllum in New Guinea.
