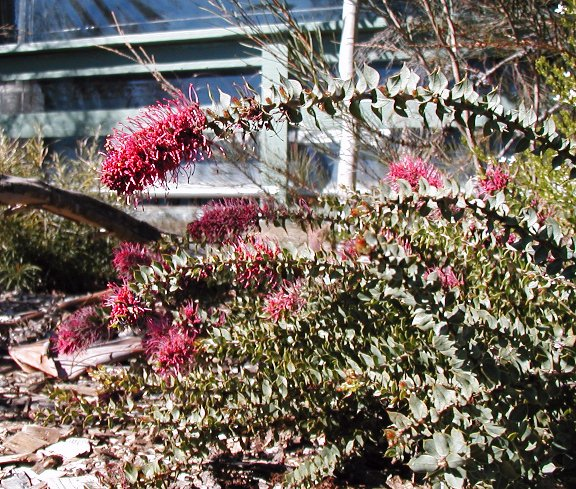

Scientific classification
- Kingdom: Plantae
- Clade: Tracheophytes
- Clade: Angiosperms
- Clade: Eudicots
- Order: Proteales
- Family: Proteaceae
- Genus: Hakea
- Species: H. myrtoides

Binomial name
- Hakea myrtoides Meisn.
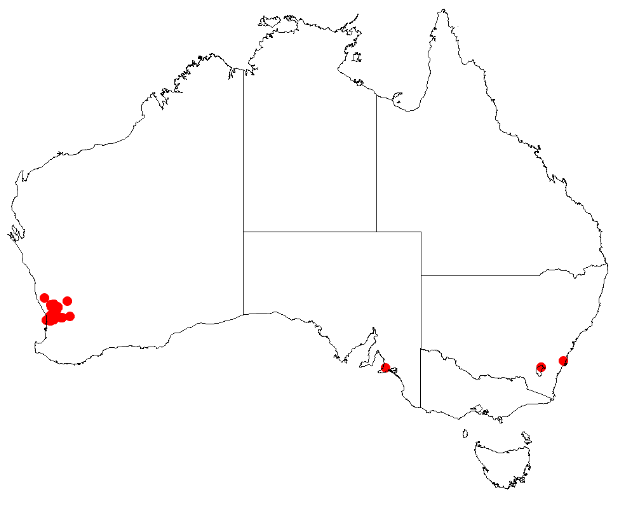
- Occurrence data from AVH

= Hakea myrtoides =

Myrtle hakea

Species of shrub endemic to Western Australia

Hakea myrtoides, commonly known as myrtle hakea, is a shrub endemic to the woodlands of the Darling Range near Perth in Western Australia.

== Description ==
Hakea myrtoides is a ground hugging shrub which may grow to 0.3–0.9 m (1–3 ft) in height and forms a lignotuber. Mauve, pink or crimson flowers grow in clusters in the leaf axils along the arching branchlets in winter and early spring, followed by small ovoid woody seed capsules that are less than 1 cm (0.4 in) in diameter with a short slightly curving beak. The rigid leaves are small, broad-elliptic and myrtle-like (hence myrtiodes) and are about 2 cm (0.8 in) in length with a prominent mid-vein and tapering to a sharp point. In cultivation the plant in often grafted onto Hakea salicifolia, which enables it to grow in a wider variety of soil conditions.

== Taxonomy and naming ==
This species was first formally described by Johann Georg Christian Lehmann in 1845 and the description was published in Plantae Preissianae. It is named from the genus Myrtus - myrtle and from the Greek oides - similar to, referring to leaf shape.

== Distribution and habitat ==
A restricted species growing near Perth with intermittent occurrences north to Victoria Plains, it grows in lateritic sandy clay, granite outcrops and wandoo woodlands. It is an ornamental garden plant good for rockeries and as a ground cover in a well-drained, open, sunny site.

== Conservation status ==
Hakea myrtoides is classified as "not threatened" by the Western Australian Government Department of Parks and Wildlife.
