= Bulbophyllum cylindrobulbum =

Scientific classification
- Kingdom: Plantae
- Clade: Tracheophytes
- Clade: Angiosperms
- Clade: Monocots
- Order: Asparagales
- Family: Orchidaceae
- Subfamily: Epidendroideae
- Genus: Bulbophyllum
- Species: B. cylindrobulbum

Binomial name
- Bulbophyllum cylindrobulbum Schltr. 1905

Synonyms
- Bulbophyllum pallidiflorum Schltr.1906

Species of orchid

Bulbophyllum cylindrobulbum is a species of orchid in the genus Bulbophyllum. They are commonly found in New Guinea and in the Solomon Islands.

This species of orchid is particularly small, around 15 to 20 cm between each cylindrical pseudobulb.
