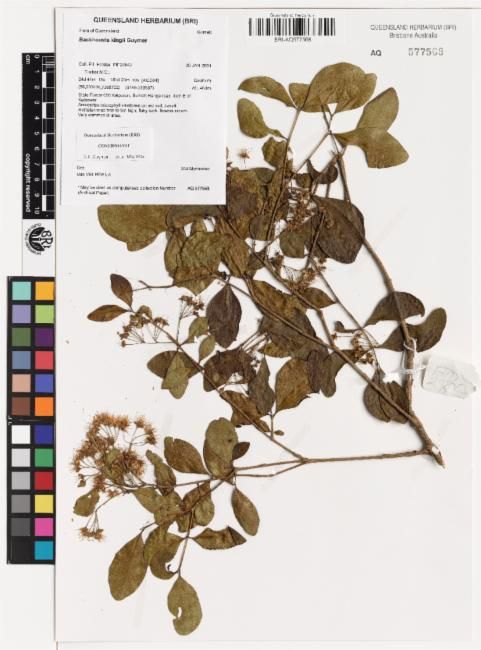
- Specimen BRI AQ0577568; CC-BY 4.0, Queensland Herbarium

Scientific classification
- Kingdom: Plantae
- Clade: Tracheophytes
- Clade: Angiosperms
- Clade: Eudicots
- Clade: Rosids
- Order: Myrtales
- Family: Myrtaceae
- Genus: Backhousia
- Species: B. kingii

Binomial name
- Backhousia kingii Guymer

= Backhousia kingii =

Species of plant in the myrtle family

Backhousia kingii (common name scaly bark ironwood) is a species of Myrtaceae endemic to Queensland, which was first described in 1988 by Gordon Guymer.

== Description ==
It is a tree growing up to 20 metres high with pale brown or greyish bark, which sheds in strips.

The leaves are opposite and highly aromatic when crushed, with oil glands which are dense and obvious.

== Distribution ==
It is found from the south of Mackay to Gayndah growing in vine thickets from close to sea level up to 400 metres (1,300 ft) above sea level.
