= Bulbophyllum posticum =

Scientific classification
- Kingdom: Plantae
- Clade: Tracheophytes
- Clade: Angiosperms
- Clade: Monocots
- Order: Asparagales
- Family: Orchidaceae
- Subfamily: Epidendroideae
- Genus: Bulbophyllum
- Species: B. posticum

Binomial name
- Bulbophyllum posticum J. J. Sm. 1911

Species of orchid

Bulbophyllum posticum is a species of orchid in the genus Bulbophyllum found in New Guinea.
