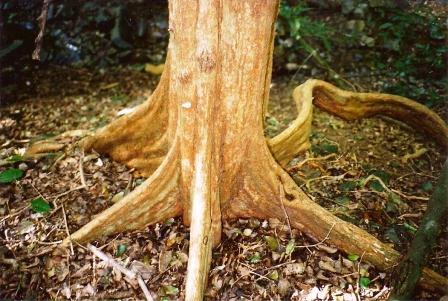
- Barrington Tops, New South Wales, Australia.

Scientific classification
- Kingdom: Plantae
- Clade: Tracheophytes
- Clade: Angiosperms
- Clade: Eudicots
- Clade: Rosids
- Order: Myrtales
- Family: Myrtaceae
- Genus: Backhousia
- Species: B. sciadophora

Binomial name
- Backhousia sciadophora F.Muell.

= Backhousia sciadophora =

Species of tree

Backhousia sciadophora is a common Australian tree, growing from near Dungog in New South Wales to near Kilcoy in southeast Queensland. Common names include shatterwood, ironwood, boomerang tree and Curracabark. The habitat of shatterwood is drier areas of rainforest in gorges and steep slopes, usually not on volcanic soils.

== Description ==
Shatterwood is a small to medium size tree, occasionally reaching 30 metres in height and 80 cm in trunk diameter. The tree's crown appears dark and attractive.

The trunk of Backhousia sciadophora is cylindrical, and often flanged or buttressed at the base. Shatterwood is so named because of the brittle nature of the timber.

The bark is grey or fawn, rough with short fibres, finely vertically fissured, shedding in narrow scales. The bark structure appears to consist of numerous paper-like layers.

=== Leaves, flowers and fruit ===
The leaves are opposite, simple, entire, broadly ovate or elliptical, 5 to 10 cm long. They are round or drawn into a blunt point, or sometimes notched. Oil dots are small and numerous. The leaf stalks are very short.

Leaf venation includes a looping intermarginal vein, well removed from the leaf's edge. A second intermarginal leaf vein is present, closer to the leaf edge. The midrib vein is sunken on the lower surface, but slightly raised above.

Flowers are white, small and numerous. The flowering period is in June and July. The fruit matures from May to August, being a brown capsule, bell-shaped, 5 mm in diameter including the five persistent calyx lobes, each 2 mm long. There are five to eight seeds in each fruit, which are oval, 1 mm long, and golden brown in colour.

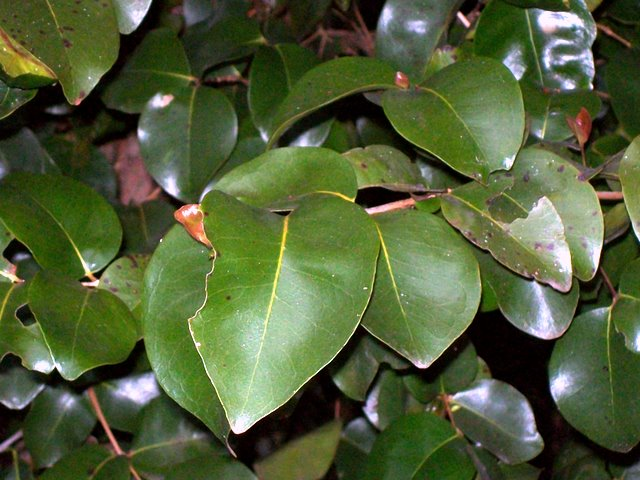
Shatterwood growing next to Thunderbolts Way, Australia
