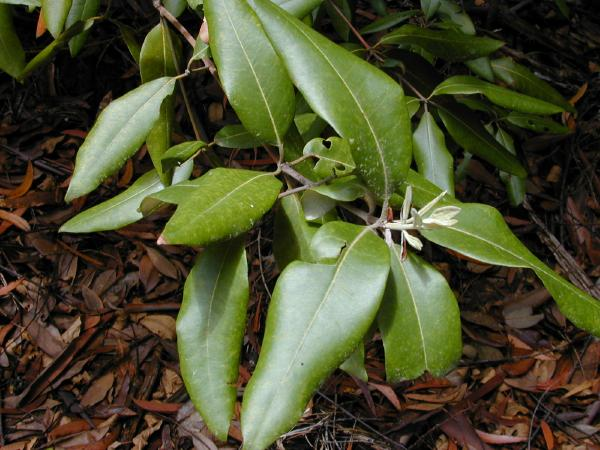
- S. glomulifera leaves

Scientific classification
- Kingdom: Plantae
- Clade: Tracheophytes
- Clade: Angiosperms
- Clade: Eudicots
- Clade: Rosids
- Order: Myrtales
- Family: Myrtaceae
- Subfamily: Myrtoideae
- Tribe: Syncarpieae
- Genus: Syncarpia; Ten.

Synonyms
- Metrosideros sect. Syncarpia (Ten.) Baill.; Nani sect. Syncarpia (Ten.) Kuntze; Kamptzia Nees

= Syncarpia =

Turpentine trees

Genus of trees

Syncarpia is a small group of trees in the myrtle family (Myrtaceae) described as a genus in 1839. They are native to Queensland and New South Wales in Australia.

They are unusual among the Myrtaceae in that the leaves are opposite rather than alternate as is the norm for the family.

The species are commonly known as turpentine trees due to the odour of their resin.

Species

- Syncarpia glomulifera (Sm.) Nied. in H.G.A.Engler & K.A.E.Prantl - Queensland, New South Wales; naturalized in Hawaii and in parts of Africa
- Syncarpia hillii F.M.Bailey - Queensland, New South Wales
- Syncarpia verecunda A.R.Bean - Queensland

S. glomulifera is considered a weed in Hawaii.

Formerly included

now in Choricarpia Xanthostemon

- Syncarpia leptopetala - Choricarpia leptopetala
- Syncarpia subargentea - Choricarpia subargentea
- Syncarpia vertholenii - Xanthostemon verus
