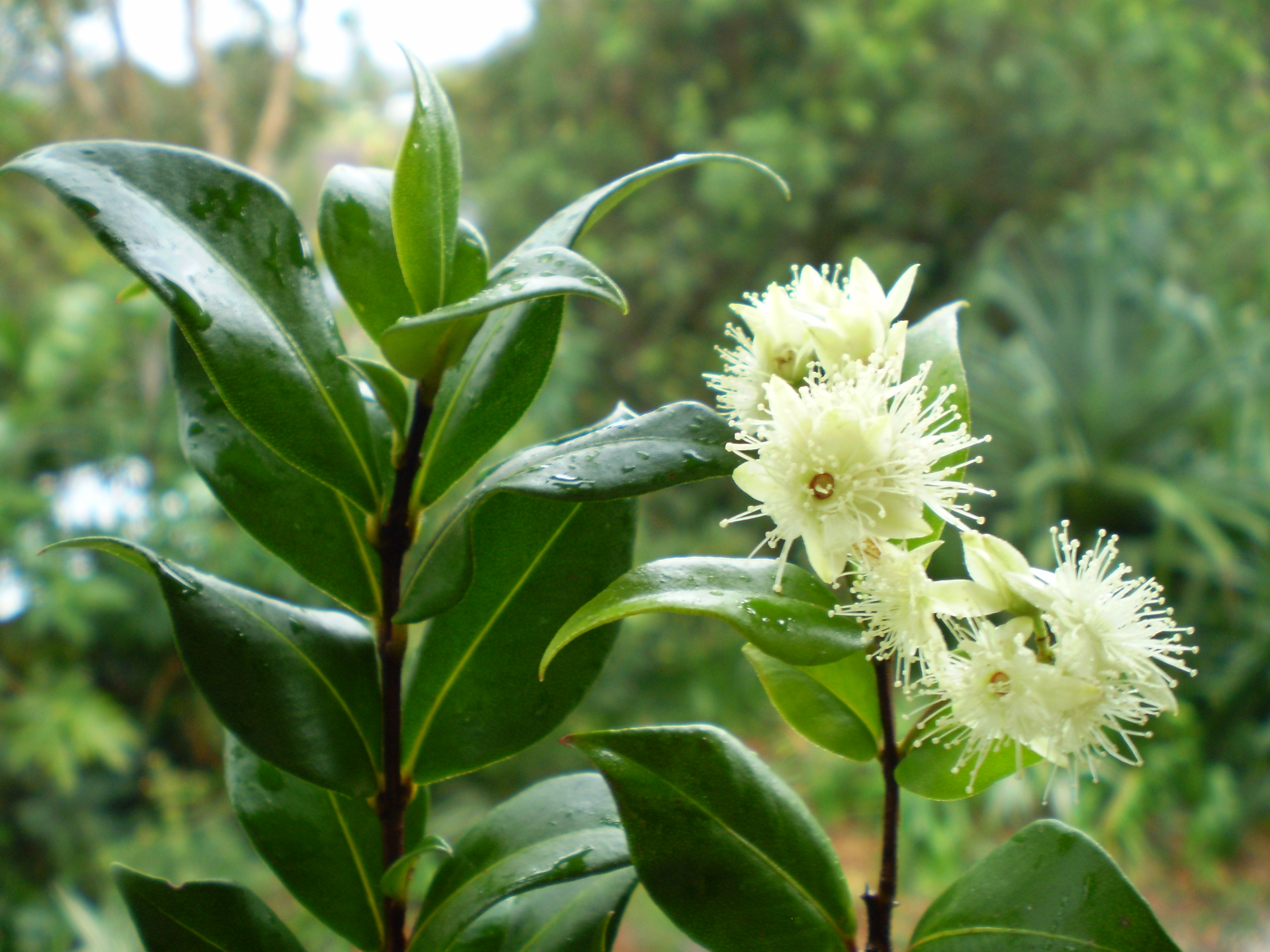
- Backhousia myrtifolia, leaf and flower

Scientific classification
- Kingdom: Plantae
- Clade: Tracheophytes
- Clade: Angiosperms
- Clade: Eudicots
- Clade: Rosids
- Order: Myrtales
- Family: Myrtaceae
- Genus: Backhousia
- Species: B. myrtifolia

Binomial name
- Backhousia myrtifolia Hook. & Harv.

= Backhousia myrtifolia =

Cinnamon myrtle

Species of flowering plant

Backhousia myrtifolia (commonly referred to as carrol, neverbreak, iron wood, grey myrtle or cinnamon myrtle) is a small rainforest tree species which grows in subtropical rainforests of Eastern Australia. First discovered and subsequently used by the indigenous communities of Australia, this plant produces oils that have a cinnamon-like aroma, and display both anti-bacterial and anti-fungal properties. Therefore, it has potential applications as not only a spice in food preparation, but also in the medical field as a treatment option for microbial infection. Backhousia myrtifolia can grow up to 30 metres. The leaves are ovate or elliptic, 4–7 cm long, and the flowers star-shaped in appearance.

Backhousia myrtifolia is renowned for the snow-white colour of its flowers, a characteristic that makes it suitable not only as a domestic/commercial crop but also as an internationally exported product. However, the susceptibility of this plant to "post-harvest browning syndrome" (a disease resulting in leaf discolouration and wilting), threatens its potential as a crop plant.

== Characteristics ==
B. myrtifolia is a native Australian species that belongs to the Myrtaceae family. B. myrtifolia is a canopy species of plant (occupying high light environments) that forms coppiced thick trunks, and tends to grow in warmer, temperate rainforest conditions. It is most often found in regions close to watering bodies, such as the Eastern coastal edges of Queensland, New South Wales and Victoria. Its most common locations include the South Coast of NSW in Bega, and off Fraser Island in Queensland. B.myrtifolia is an evergreen and has an average life-expectancy of between 80 and 100 years. These plants tend to bloom between late spring and early summer, producing ivory white starfish-shaped flowers with 5 individual sepals and capsule like fruiting bodies. Lastly, oil glands are visible as fine white dots throughout the leaf's structure and are responsible for the release of four major organic compounds: methyl eugenol, (E)-methyl isoeugenol, elemicin and (E)-isoelemicin which collectively produce the plant's distinct cinnamon-like aroma.

=== Discovery and early uses ===
Backhousia myrtifolia was first documented and subsequently named after an English botanist James Backhouse (1794–1869), in his report on Australian landscape and wildlife titled A narrative of a visit to the Australian colonies. James Backhouse was renowned not only for his publications in the field of botany, but also the friendships he formed with the indigenous Australians, whose land he was conducting research on. However, prior to this B. myrtifolia was used extensively by indigenous Australians as a spice in cooking, due to its unique aroma and widespread accessibility.

== Common diseases and cultivation options ==
B. myrtifolia is fast-growing (as measured by plant biomass, leaf area and leaf biomass per plant) under ideal conditions, which includes fertile soil, high irradiance levels and sufficient water supplies. Maximum growth is achieved in the presence of oxygen-rich air (minimal carbon or nitric oxide pollutants) as well as nutrient-abundant soil, rich in micro-organism and mineral diversity. In addition to this B. myrtifolia tolerates drought, periods of inundation and repeated root disturbance, meaning that they are capable of flourishing in areas that experience constant temperature, and weather fluctuations. Therefore, this plant is suitable for cultivation in both domestic and commercial Australian environments (gardens or on footpaths) in both tropical (higher rainfall) and coastal climates. In these urban settings Backhousia myrtifolia has an average life expectancy of 60 years, requiring very little maintenance, presuming it receives consistently high sunlight levels. This is ideal for domestic governments and councils, since it minimises the costs associated with plant watering, trimming and root clearance.

=== Post-harvest browning syndrome ===
However, despite these seemingly ideal properties for domestic cultivation, the species is particularly susceptible to a condition termed "post-harvest browning syndrome", which involves the discolouration, browning and wilting of the plant's stereotypically dark green leaves. This browning syndrome was first documented between July and September 2008, on a 4-year stock of B. myrtifolia plants located at the University of Queensland. The discoloration was visible initially as small black dots on the surface of the leaves, progressing later into larger brown stained regions. This condition affected approximately 30% of the harvested plants, signifying it infects populations of B. myrtifolia randomly, in non-specific quantities.

Although research is still being conducted into its causes, "post-harvest browning syndrome" has been attributed to two primary factors:

- Fungal and/or bacterial infection
- Prolonged heat exposure and lack of temperature control

Infection of B. myrtifolia by the fungus Alternaria alternata was analysed and confirmed via Koch's postulates (a series of tests used to analyse the pathogenicity of certain bacteria and fungi). Alternaria alternata was found to release certain low-molecular weight host-specific toxins (HSTs) such as tenuazonic acid, tentoxin and zinniol . These toxins not only damage plant cell membranes but also cause permeability changes in the cell wall, that may contribute to plant browning and death . In addition to this, these HST toxins may also cause disruptions in the oil gland structure of the plant's leaves, resulting in oil leakage. The leakage of the plant's 4 oil chemotypes damages the efficiency of sunlight capture by chlorophylls (decreased chlorophyll fluorescence) resulting ultimately in the development of black and brown spots along the leaves' surface. On the other hand, prolonged exposure to heat stress, was also found to produce free radicals in the leaves of B. myrtifolia plants. These radicals oxidise the lipoprotein membranes surrounding cells, resulting in a loss of cellular compartmentalisation and structure, once again damaging chlorophyll content and chlorophyll fluorescence. This is thought to be another significant contributing factor to the high rates of browning observed for this particular plant. Therefore, it is recommended that B. myrtifolia be kept at temperatures above in the presence of above 20mL of water, to prevent the development of post-harvest browning syndrome.

This browning of leaves not only damages the visual appearance of B. myrtifolia leaves, but also eliminates the recognisable cinnamon aroma produced by the oils of the plant. Therefore, since no treatment options currently exist for "post-harvest browning syndrome" (despite its high frequency), the viability of B. myrtifolia as a domestic product is decreased considerably.

== Possible uses of Backhousia myrtifolia ==
Illustration of a single B. myrtifolia stem, and a cross-section of its flowering body

=== Food additives ===
Backhousia myrtifolia is used extensively as an aromatic/spice, due to the unique properties of its natural oils; methyl eugenol and elemicin. These oils combine to produce a natural cinnamon-like fragrance, and as a result B. myrtifolia can be used as a flavouring agent in biscuits, stews and desserts. In addition to this the B. myrtifolia plant is rich in fibres, vitamins (Vitamin A, C, E, K and pyridoxine) and minerals (potassium, calcium and copper) which are important in maintaining homeostatic body function. Vitamins function as co-enzymes in the body, accelerating the rate of biological reactions, whilst minerals such as potassium are useful in preserving cellular electrochemical gradients, and thus maintaining musculoskeletal function.

=== Medicinal applications ===
Despite this, research is also being conducted into B. myrtifolia's application as an anti-bacterial or anti-fungal agent, due to the bactericidal properties of its oils. The methyl eugenol and elemicin components of B. myrtifolia's natural oils are very potent anti-septic agents, capable of inhibiting the growth of over 100 species of bacteria cumulatively. The methyl eugenol oil of B. myrtifolia is capable of breaking down the thick peptidoglycan wall of gram positive bacteria whilst, elemicin creates small pores in the outer lipopolysaccharide layer of gram negative bacteria. Through both these mechanisms, B. myrtifolia is capable of exposing the interior of bacterial cells, to the external environment, therefore killing them. Consequently, the Aqueous and methanolic leaf extracts of B. Myrtifolia were found to inhibit the growth of both Proteus mirabilis and Escherichia coli bacteria. Infection by the P. mirabilis bacterium is responsible for between 1-10% of urinary tract infections and has also been linked as a causative agent of rheumatoid arthritis, whilst E. coli is generally responsible for gastro-intestinal infections such as food poisoning. In addition to this, the oils produced by the B. myrtifolia plants are non-toxic (as determined by an Artemia franciscana nauplii bioassay) further supporting their use as either an internal or topical treatment for bacterial/fungal infections.

=== Insect repellents ===
In this same vein of thought, the anti-septic properties of Backhousia myrtifolia's oils also make it suitable for use as an insect repellent against common disease-carrying arthropods such as mosquitoes, flies and beetles. Elemicin, a compound derived from the oils of B. myrtifolia leaves can replace substances such as citronella oil, which is the common active ingredient in candle and torch insect repellents. The resultant naturally sourced insect repellents, would be especially useful to individuals who suffer allergic reactions to the chemicals present in conventional repellents (diethyl phthalate, dimethyl carbate etc.). In countries such as Indonesia and Papua New Guinea, where the rates of mosquito spread malaria and West Nile virus are high, B. myrtifolia based repellents would be especially useful.

== Backhousia myrtifolia as an exported product ==
B. myrtifolia is a desired product for international exportation (particularly to Asian regions such as Japan) due to the unique ivory-white colour of its flowers. Initially, between 1995 and 2000 the profits made through exportation, specifically around the holiday season were high, since the flower was labelled "the Christmas Carol" by Australian farmers. Therefore, the plant was exported mainly due to its aesthetic qualities rather than its medicinal or food-related uses. To match the slowly increasing demand for the plant in various countries including Asia and Western Europe, Australians in southern NSW began to develop farms dedicated to its production.

However, through mismanagement, ineffective sales tactics, and the increasing prevalence of "post-harvest browning syndrome" the popularity of the plant decreased by over 40% in 2004. The browning syndrome was reported to infect up to 20% of all exported plants causing a drop in the average exported plant quality from a rating of 2.75 (classified as ideal quality and freshness) to 1.75 (acceptable quality). The B. Myrtifolia market was dependent entirely on plant quality and appearance, and therefore as this began to decrease so did the profits generated by the industry. In response to this Australian growers and exporters in 2004, congregated to form the Backhousia Group, an organisation determined to improve sales, through more efficient farming techniques and aggressive sales campaigns. The development of this value chain alliance in 2004, helped restore the Backhousia botanical industry, to a profitable margin within a period of two years. Furthermore, with the uses of the plant now expanded, its potential as an exported product for antibacterial, cooking or repellent purposes may grow.
