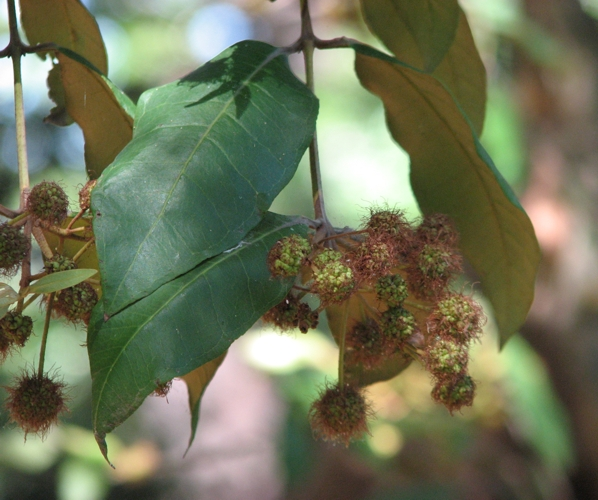

Scientific classification
- Kingdom: Plantae
- Clade: Tracheophytes
- Clade: Angiosperms
- Clade: Eudicots
- Clade: Rosids
- Order: Myrtales
- Family: Myrtaceae
- Genus: Backhousia
- Species: B. leptopetala

Binomial name
- Backhousia leptopetala (F.Muell.) M.G.Harr.

Synonyms
- Choricarpia leptopetala (F.Muell.) Domin; Syncarpia leptopetala F.Muell.

= Backhousia leptopetala =

Species of tree

Backhousia leptopetala (syn. Choricarpia leptopetala) is a common Australian tree, growing from Stanwell Park (34° S) in the northern Illawarra district to near Buderim (26° S) in south eastern Queensland.

Common names include brown myrtle, never-break, brush turpentine and rusty turpentine. The habitat of Backhousia leptopetala is rainforest on the poorer sedimentary soils, near streams. It is also seen in moist eucalyptus areas on ridges. It may be identified by the greyish fawn colour under the leaf, and rusty hairy branchlets.

== Description ==
Backhousia leptopetala is a small tree, occasionally reaching 20 metres in height and 35 cm in trunk diameter. The tree has attractive displays of cream flowers and appealing foliage.

The bark is a greyish brown, relatively soft, flaky or corky. The trunk is somewhat fluted and irregular. Larger trees are flanged at the base.

The leaves are opposite, simple and entire, broad with a fine leaf tip, and around 5 to 13 cm long. The edges of the leaves are curled over and wavy, mid-green above, but a greyish fawny green underneath. The midrib is sunken on the top surface, but venation is prominent under the leaf. Near the wavy leaf edge is an intramarginal vein, which is not always easily seen. The underside of the leaf is covered in tiny hairs.

Flowers are small, cream or white, densely together in globular heads, appearing in July to September. From a distance, its flowers resemble the Callicoma.

The fruit matures from August to November, being mostly a two-celled capsule, around 13 mm in diameter. Fresh seed is recommended for germination. Cuttings are not a successful method of regeneration.

== Uses ==
An attractive ornamental tree.

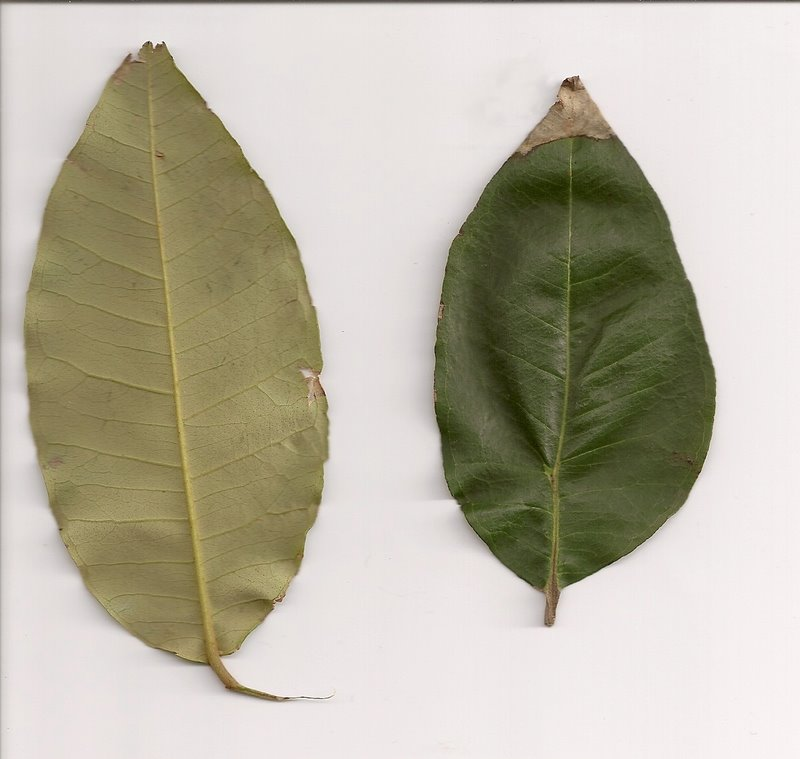
Scanned leaves

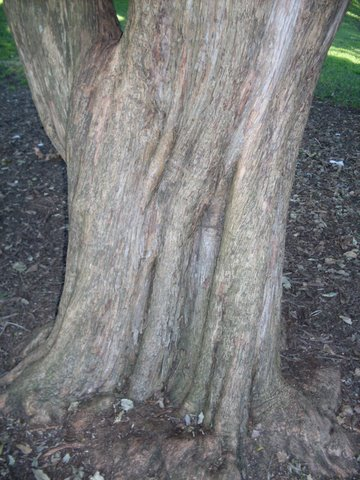
Trunk
