= Betsy Rivers Jackes =

Australian botanist and author

- Born: Betsy Rivers Paterson; 19 March 1935 (age 91); Bingara, New South Wales, Australia
- Education: University of New England (Australia)
- Spouse: E. M. Jackes (1935–2016)
- Scientific career
- Fields: Botany
- Workplaces: JCU, UNE, UQ
- Author abbrev. (botany): Jackes

Betsy Rivers Jackes AM (born 1935) is an Australian botanist, researcher, taxonomist and author. Her research interests are the plants in the families Myrsinaceae and Vitaceae.

== Education ==
Jackes completed her BSc in 1957, followed by her MSc in 1959, at the University of New England (UNE) in Armidale, New South Wales. She won a Fulbright Scholarship to study in the United States and took up a position as a research scholar at the University of Chicago (UC), where she earned her PhD in 1961.

== Career ==
Jackes initially began work as a tutor in botany at UNE in 1957, before taking on the same role at the University of Queensland (UQ) in 1963. From 1973 through to 2018 she was a lecturer at James Cook University (JCU) in Townsville, Queensland, where she headed the Tropical Plant Sciences Department, and was deputy head of the School of Tropical Biology. She is the author (or co-author) of many papers, articles, and environmental consultancy reports, and has published a number of books.

On Thursday, 24 March 2021, Jackes was presented one of the highest JCU awards, a Doctor of Science honoris causa, the sixth awardee for that degree at the university. This was for her sustained contributions to discovering and cataloguing tropical flora in northern Queensland, continued work with plant systematics and the ecology of the tropical flora.

Jackes was appointed a Member of the Order of Australia in the 2023 Australia Day Honours.

The standard author abbreviation Jackes is used to indicate this person as the author when citing a botanical name. Prior to her marriage, the author abbreviation B.R.Paterson was used.

== Legacy ==
As of 31 August 2021, the International Plant Names Index (IPNI) list 43 species of plants that were authored by her. The following is a list of those with articles on this wiki:

- Clematicissus opaca
- Backhousia tetraptera
- Dendrocnide cordifolia
- Myrsine howittiana
- Myrsine richmondensis

Plants named in honour of Jackes include:

- Betsy's wattle (Acacia jackesiana (Pedley)), a north Queensland floral native with a limited range west and north of Townsville; and
- the fossilised Cissocarpus jackesiae (Rozefelds) (also listed as Cissocarpus jackesii), a species of grape in the family Vitaceae native to Australia. The genus Cissocarpus was formed with the grouping of seeds from the Oligocene silcretes.

== Selected publications ==
=== Research papers ===
For a more comprehensive list, see "Publications by: Betsy R. Jackes". James Cook University.

- Jackes, Betsy R. (2020). "Transfer of three species of Cayratia Juss., to Causonis Raf. (Vitaceae)". Telopea. 23: 69–71. doi:10.7751/telopea14296. S2CID 225780199.
- Jackes, Betsy R. (2019). "Hibbertia Andrews (Dilleniaceae, Guinea Flowers) in North Queensland, Townsville area to the tip of Cape York Peninsula" (PDF). North Queensland Naturalist. 49: 84–99.
- Jackes, Betsy R.; Rossetto, Maurizio (2006). "A new combination in Clematicissus Planch. (Vitaceae)". Telopea. 11 (3): 390–391. doi:10.7751/telopea20065735.
- Jackes, Betsy R. (2018). "Hibbertia ferox Jackes (Dilleniaceae), a new species from the White Mountains area of north Queensland" (PDF). Austrobaileya. 10 (2): 282–285.
- Jackes, B.R.; Hurley, M. (1997). "A new combination in Dendrocnide (Urticaceae) in north Queensland". Austrobaileya. 5 (1): 121–123. JSTOR 41729927.

=== Books ===
For a more comprehensive list, see "Results for author:'Jackes, Betsy R. (Betsy Rivers), 1935–'". National Library of Australia.

- Jackes, Betsy R. (1996). A guide to the plants of the Burra Range. Townsville, Qld: Dept of Botany, James Cook University of North Queensland. ISBN 0864435843.
- Jackes, Betsy R. (1990). Plants of the tropical rainforest. Townsville, Qld., Australia: Botany Dept, James Cook University of North Queensland. ISBN 086443359X.
- Jackes, Betsy R. (2001). Plants of the tropics : rainforest to heath; an identification guide. Townsville, Qld: James Cook University, School of Tropical Biology. ISBN 0864436858.
- Jackes, Betsy R. (1992). Poisonous plants in Northern Australian gardens including plants with irritant properties. Townsville, Qld: Botany Dept, James Cook University of North Queensland. ISBN 0864433875.

=== Articles ===
- Betsy Jackes (15 March 2019). "Guinea flowers are fierce and golden". The Conversation. The Conversation Media Group Ltd.

== See also ==
- Women in science
- Women in STEM fields
