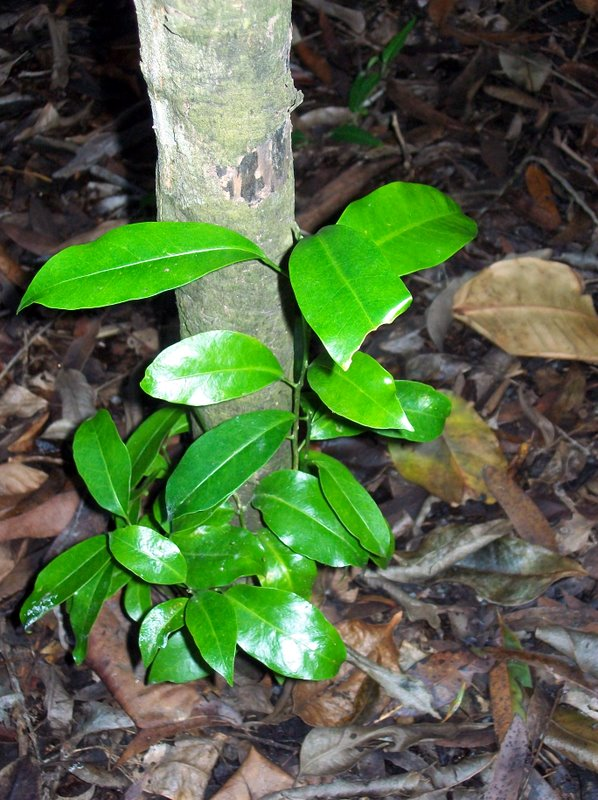
- Fontainea oraria

Scientific classification
- Kingdom: Plantae
- Clade: Tracheophytes
- Clade: Angiosperms
- Clade: Eudicots
- Clade: Rosids
- Order: Malpighiales
- Family: Euphorbiaceae
- Subfamily: Crotonoideae
- Tribe: Codiaeae
- Genus: Fontainea; Heckel

Type species
- Fontainea pancheri (Baill.) Heckel

= Fontainea =

Genus of flowering plants

Fontainea is a genus constituting part of the plant family Euphorbiaceae. The nine currently known species grow naturally in Queensland (Qld) and New South Wales (NSW) Australia (6 spp.), New Caledonia and Vanuatu (1 sp.), and Papua New Guinea (2 spp.). Some species are commonly named blushwood.

One species, Fontainea oraria, the coast fontainea, is known only from 10 living plants growing on private property near Lennox Head in northern New South Wales, Australia. Its status is critically endangered.

In 1870 in a European medical science doctoral thesis Édouard Marie Heckel first named this genus in honour of his supervisor Constant Aristide Fontaine (1818–1900), professor of chemistry and toxicology at Toulon, France.

A compound, EBC-46, taken from the seed or other plant parts of these spp. or from Hylandia dockrillii has potential cancer-fighting properties in current research and recently published studies. The experimental drug shows promising early results in pre-clinical trials in animal models.

== Description ==
Plants in the genus, Fontainea, are shrubs or small trees. They are dioecious or rarely monoecious, and they exude a colored latex. The leaves are alternate, entire and have pinnate venation. The flowers have pedicels. The male flowers have 18 - 32 free stamens on the receptacle, while the female flowers have ovaries with 3 - 6 uni-ovulate cells and 3 - 6 short and deeply bilobed stigmas.

== Species ==
Sourced from the authoritative Australian Plant Name Index and Australian Plant Census, as of October 2014, the 1985 published genus revision, the 1997 new keys and spp. descriptions, and the Kew World Checklist of Selected Plant Families.

- Fontainea australis Jessup & Guymer, southern fontainea – Qld, NSW
- Fontainea borealis P.I.Forst. – Papua New Guinea
- Fontainea fugax P.I.Forst. – Burnett Distr, Qld
- Fontainea oraria Jessup & Guymer, coast fontainea – Lennox Head, NSW
- Fontainea pancheri (Baill.) Heckel – New Caledonia incl Loyalty Is.
- Fontainea picrosperma C.T.White, fountain's blushwood; fontain's blush – Atherton Tableland, Qld
- Fontainea rostrata Jessup & Guymer – Wide Bay–Burnett, Qld
- Fontainea subpapuana P.I.Forst. – Papua New Guinea
- Fontainea venosa Jessup & Guymer – Logan City, Qld
