= Fontainea fugax =

Conservation status
- Endangered (NCA)

Scientific classification
- Kingdom: Plantae
- Clade: Tracheophytes
- Clade: Angiosperms
- Clade: Eudicots
- Clade: Rosids
- Order: Malpighiales
- Family: Euphorbiaceae
- Genus: Fontainea
- Species: F. fugax

Binomial name
- Fontainea fugax P.I.Forst.

Species of plant

Fontainea fugax is a shrub endemic to Queensland, in the family, Euphorbiaceae, growing up to 4 m. In 1997, F. fugax was considered "endangered" having been found in only in the central Burnett district and within an endangered community, threatened by weeds, repeated fires and clearing.

== Description ==
Fontainea fugax is a dioecious shrub growing to 4 m. The stems have a clear exudate. New shoots have sparse, antrorse (upward pointing) trichomes. There are no stipules and the leaves have petioles. The upper surfaces of the leaves are dark-green and the lower surfaces, pale-green. This plant is very like Fontainea rostrata, but differs in that the base of the petiole is not swollen; the male flowers are shorter than those of F. rostrata (6–8 mm vs 11–13 mm); the number of stamens is 24 (versus 28–40); the beak of the endocarp is shorter (1-1.7 mm vs 2–3 mm) and the faces between the sutures of the endocarp are weakly corrugated (weakly rugose versus strongly rugose).

== Distribution and habitat ==
Fontainea fugax is known only from an area between Gurgeena and Binjour near Gayndah and Mundubbera in south-east Queensland. Foutainea fugax grows as an understorey shrub in dry rainforest semi-evergreen vine thicket dominated by Backhousia kingii. One population of a single clonal plant is located in Gurgeena Conservation Park, the other population is located in Gurgeena State Forest containing 50 individuals.

== Taxonomy and naming ==
The plant was first described by Paul Irwin Forster in "Three new species of Fontainea Heckel (Euphorbiaceae) from Australia and Papua New Guinea". The holotype AQ 650045 was collected on February 9, 1994, on the Gurgeena Plateau (Burnett district, Queensland) at a height of 360 m.

The specific epithet, fugax, derives from the Latin for "fleeting" and refers to the fleeting flowering material of this species, with female flowers not having been seen.

== Conservation status ==
Fontainea fugax is listed as Endangered under the Queensland Nature Conservation Act 1992. The regional ecosystem where this species grows has a biodiversity status of "endangered" and is described as Semi-evergreen vine thicket on Cainozoic sand plains and/or remnant surfaces (11.5.15). It is listed as "least concern" under the Queensland Management Vegetation Act 1999.

== Threats ==
This species is facing many threats including disturbance from land clearing for agriculture, incursion of weeds, and inappropriate fire regimes. The population in the Gurgeena State Forest is being repeatedly being affected by fire on the western boundary and weeds such as Verbesina encelioides (Mexican Daisy) and Aristolochia elegans (Dutchmans Pipe) on the eastern boundary. Most of the semi evergreen vine thicket vegetation in the area where this species could have occurred has been cleared for agriculture and grazing.

== See also ==
- Zieria vagans (Gurgeena stink bush)
- Phebalium distans
- Pomaderris clivicola
- Bertya opponens
- Bertya pedicellata
