= O. spinosa =

O. spinosa may refer to:

- Ochrotrichia spinosa, a microcaddisfly species in the genus Ochrotrichia
- Octonoba spinosa, a non-venomous spider species in the genus Octonoba
- Oncoba spinosa, a flowering plant species
- Onigocia spinosa, a fish species in the genus Onigocia
- Ononis spinosa, a medicinal plant species
- Ophellantha spinosa, a plant species in the genus Ophellantha
- Opopaea spinosa, a spider species in the genus Opopaea and the family Oonopidae
- Ovalia spinosa, a harvestman species in the genus Ovalia

== See also ==
- Spinosa (disambiguation)
