= Blushwood =

Blushwood is a common name for several Australian flowering plants in the spurge family Euphorbiaceae and may refer to:

- Fontainea picrosperma, the source of a compound investigated as a cancer treatment
- Hylandia dockrillii
