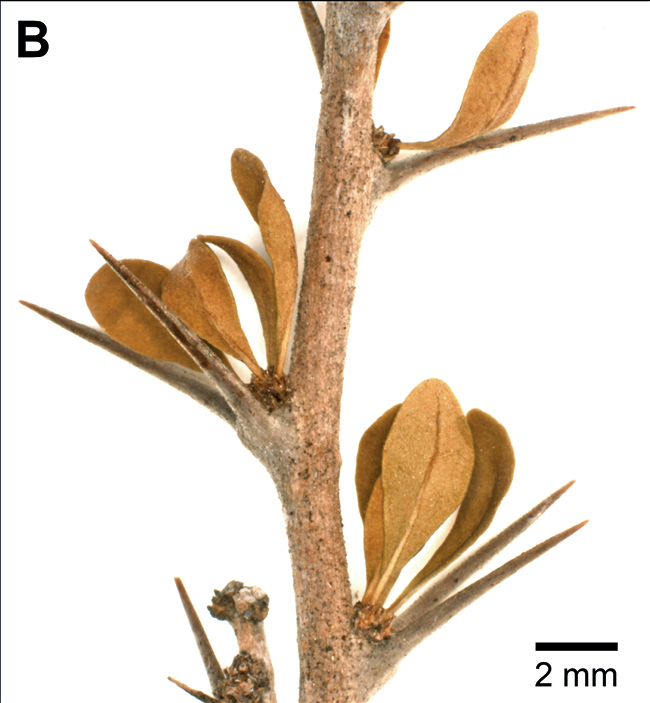
- Spiny stipules on Acidocroton verrucosus

Scientific classification
- Kingdom: Plantae
- Clade: Tracheophytes
- Clade: Angiosperms
- Clade: Eudicots
- Clade: Rosids
- Order: Malpighiales
- Family: Euphorbiaceae
- Subfamily: Crotonoideae
- Tribe: Codiaeae
- Genus: Acidocroton; Griseb. 1859, conserved name

Type species
- Acidocroton adelioides Griseb.

= Acidocroton =

Genus of flowering plants

Acidocroton is a genus of plants under the family Euphorbiaceae first described with this name in 1859. It is native to Colombia, Mexico and the Greater Antilles.

== Taxonomy ==
Etymologically, the name Acidocroton means "sour croton".

=== Species ===
The following species are recorded:

1. Acidocroton acunae - Cuba
2. Acidocroton adelioides - Cuba
3. Acidocroton ekmanii - E Cuba
4. Acidocroton gentryi - Colombia (Cundinamarca)
5. Acidocroton horridus - Hispaniola (Dominican Republic, Haiti)
6. Acidocroton litoralis - Haiti
7. Acidocroton lobulatus - SE Cuba
8. Acidocroton madrigalensis - Mexico (Tabasco)
9. Acidocroton montanus - Hispaniola
10. Acidocroton oligostemon - C + E Cuba
11. Acidocroton trichophyllus - Cuba
12. Acidocroton verrucosus - Jamaica

formerly included

moved to Ophellantha

1. Acidocroton spinosus - Ophellantha spinosa
2. Acidocroton steyermarkii - Ophellantha steyermarkii
