= Cinetomorpha =

Scientific classification
- Kingdom: Animalia
- Phylum: Arthropoda
- Subphylum: Chelicerata
- Class: Arachnida
- Order: Araneae
- Infraorder: Araneomorphae
- Family: Oonopidae
- Genus: Cinetomorpha; Simon, 1892

Type species
- C. simplex Simon, 1892

Species
- 41, see text

Synonyms
- Lucetia Dumitrescu & Georgescu, 1983; Yumates Chamberlin, 1924

Genus of spiders

Cinetomorpha is a genus of goblin spiders first described by Eugène Louis Simon in 1892. It is a senior synonym of Lucetia, and Yumates.

== Distribution ==
Species of this genus are found in The Americas, from Florida to Argentina.

== Species ==
As of February 2022 it contains forty one species:

- C. adaga Ott & Bonaldo, 2019 – Colombia, Ecuador, Peru, Brazil
- C. angela (Chamberlin, 1924) – Mexico
- C. atlantica Ott & Brescovit, 2019 – Brazil
- C. baja Ott & Ubick, 2019 – Mexico
- C. bandolera Ott & Harvey, 2019 – USA, Mexico
- C. boraceia Ott & Brescovit, 2019 – Brazil, Argentina
- C. campana Ott & Harvey, 2019 – Chile
- C. central Ott & Brescovit, 2019 – Brazil
- C. chicote Ott & Bonaldo, 2019 – Colombia, Ecuador, Peru, Brazil
- C. concepcion Ott & Harvey, 2019 – Chile
- C. floridana (Banks, 1896) – USA
- C. iguazu Ott & Brescovit, 2019 – Brazil, Argentina
- C. itabaiana Ott & Brescovit, 2019 – Brazil
- C. laguna Ott & Ubick, 2019 – Mexico
- C. lavras Ott & Brescovit, 2019 – Brazil
- C. longisetosa Ott & Harvey, 2019 – Costa Rica, Brazil
- C. lorenzo Ott & Harvey, 2019 – Guatemala
- C. loreto Ott & Bonaldo, 2019 – Peru
- C. nayarit Ott & Harvey, 2019 – Mexico
- C. nesophila (Chamberlin, 1924) – Mexico
- C. orellana Ott & Bonaldo, 2019 – Ecuador
- C. patquiana (Birabén, 1954) – Argentina
- C. pauferro Ott & Brescovit, 2019 – Brazil
- C. peluda Ott & Harvey, 2019 – Chile
- C. pinheiral Ott & Brescovit, 2019 – Brazil
- C. platensis (Birabén, 1954) – Argentina
- C. pocone Ott & Brescovit, 2019 – Brazil
- C. puberula Simon, 1893 – Trinidad and Tobago, Venezuela, Colombia
- C. punctata Ott & Brescovit, 2019 – Brazil
- C. quillota Ott & Harvey, 2019 – Chile
- C. rinconada Ott & Harvey, 2019 – Chile
- C. santamaria Ott & Brescovit, 2019 – Argentina
- C. sedata (Gertsch & Mulaik, 1940) – USA
- C. silvestris Simon, 1893 – Venezuela
- C. similis Ott & Brescovit, 2019 – Brazil
- C. simplex Simon, 1892 (type) – Mexico, USA and Caribbean to Argentina
- C. sternalis Ott & Bonaldo, 2019 – Brazil
- C. sur Ott & Ubick, 2019 – Mexico
- C. vianai (Birabén, 1954) – Ecuador, Peru, Brazil, Argentina
- C. waorani Ott & Bonaldo, 2019 – Ecuador, Peru
- C. zero Ott & Harvey, 2019 – Mexico to Venezuela

== See also ==
- Gamasomorpha
- Opopaea
