= Fontainea borealis =

Scientific classification
- Kingdom: Plantae
- Clade: Tracheophytes
- Clade: Angiosperms
- Clade: Eudicots
- Clade: Rosids
- Order: Malpighiales
- Family: Euphorbiaceae
- Genus: Fontainea
- Species: F. borealis

Binomial name
- Fontainea borealis P.I.Forst.

Species of flowering plant

Fontainea borealis is a small tree endemic to Papua New Guinea, in the family, Euphorbiaceae, which grows to a height of 12 m.

== Description ==
Fontainea borealis is a small dioecious tree growing to 12 m. The colour of the stem exudate is unknown. New shoots have dense, antrorse (upward pointing) golden trichomes. There are no stipules and the leaves have petioles, which are swollen at both the base and apex. The upper surfaces of the leaves are dark-green and the lower surfaces, pale-green. There are 8-14 lateral veins on each side of the midrib and between these the venation is reticulate. This plant is very like Fontainea picrosperma, but differs in that it has no glands in the leaf lamina; the disk is irregularly lobed and not as high as that of F. picrosperma (c 0.6 mm high vs 0.7–1 mm); the calyx of the male flower has four lobes (versus 2-3 lobes); the male calyx lobes are ovate/broadly ovate versus triangular ovate; and the stamens are joined for 1–1.5 mm versus 0.5 mm for F. picrosperma.

== Distribution and habitat ==
Fontainea borealis is known only from the Eastern Highlands Province of Papua New Guinea, at altitudes of 1800–2000 m.

== Taxonomy and naming ==
The plant was first described by Paul Irwin Forster in "Three new species of Fontainea Heckel (Euphorbiaceae) from Australia and Papua New Guinea". The holotype K000959476 was collected in 1944 by L.S. Smith at Aiyura in the Central Highlands of Papua New Guinea.

The specific epithet, borealis, derives from the Latin for "northern" and refers to the northerly distribution of this species with respect to the genus.
