= C. nanus =

C. nanus may refer to:

- Cercartetus nanus, the eastern pygmy possum, a marsupial species found in south-eastern Australia
- Cerion nanus, an air-breathing land snail species
- Choristotanyderus nanus, an extinct protodipteran insect species living in the Permian period
- Cisticola nanus, the tiny cisticola, a bird species found in Ethiopia, Kenya, Somalia and Sudan
- Colobocarpos nanus, a plant species native to Laos and Northern Thailand
- Corydoras nanus, a tropical freshwater fish species

== See also ==
- Nanus (disambiguation)
