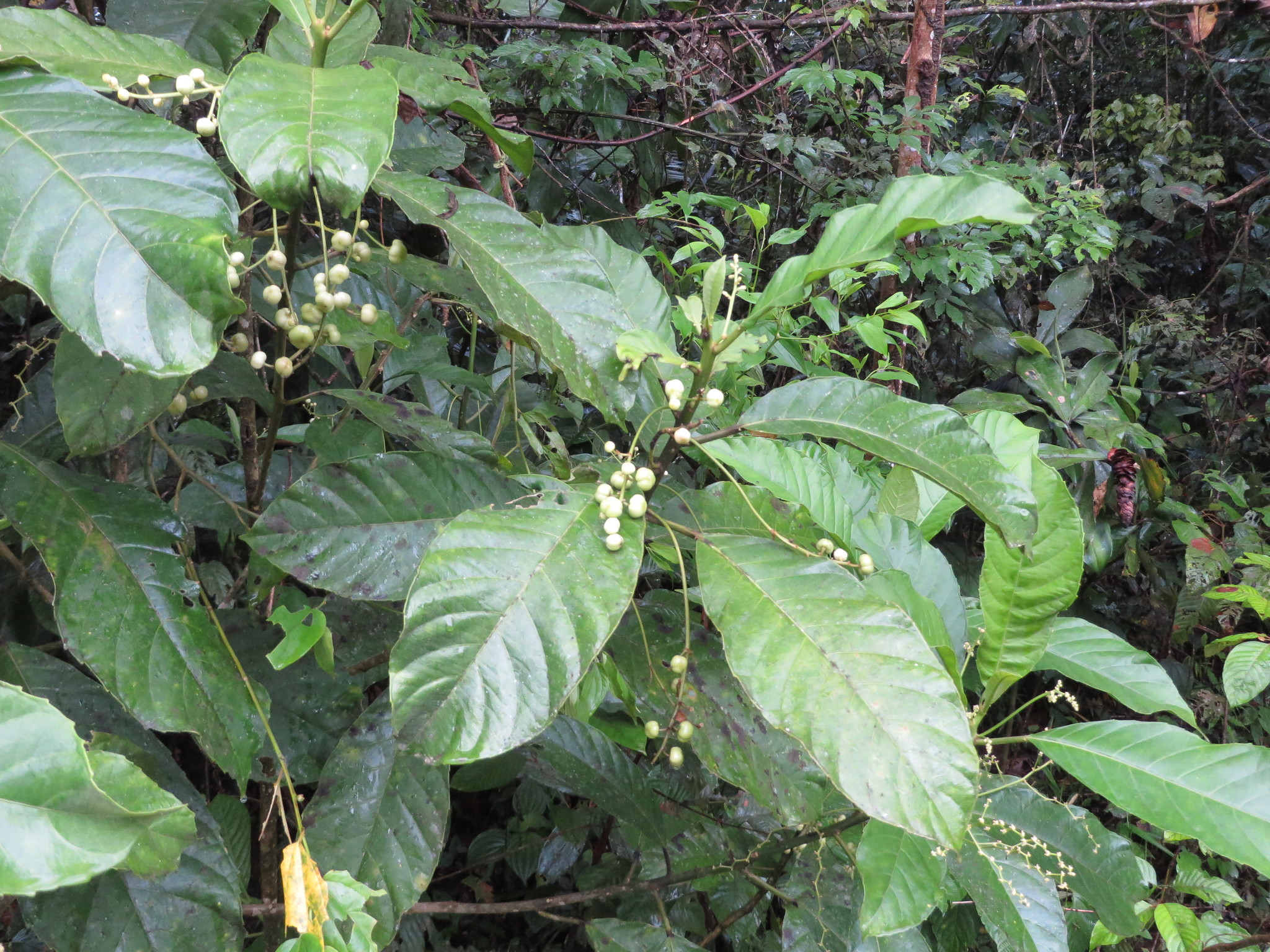
- Pausandra trianae

Scientific classification
- Kingdom: Plantae
- Clade: Tracheophytes
- Clade: Angiosperms
- Clade: Eudicots
- Clade: Rosids
- Order: Malpighiales
- Family: Euphorbiaceae
- Subfamily: Crotonoideae
- Tribe: Codiaeae
- Genus: Pausandra; Radlk.

= Pausandra =

Genus of flowering plants

Pausandra is a plant genus of the family Euphorbiaceae first described in 1870. It is native to Central America and South America.

species

1. Pausandra fordii Secco - Amapá, French Guiana
2. Pausandra hirsuta Lanj. - Peru (Amazonas, Loreto), Brazil (Amazonas, Acre), Bolivia (Pando), Colombia (Amazonas)
3. Pausandra macropetala Ducke - Brazil (Amazonas, Pará), Peru (Loreto), Venezuela (Amazonas)
4. Pausandra macrostachya Ducke - Pará
5. Pausandra martini Baill. - French Guiana, Suriname, Guyana, Colombia, Venezuela, Peru, Brazil
6. Pausandra megalophylla Müll.Arg. - Rio de Janeiro
7. Pausandra morisiana (Casar.) Radlk. - Brazil
8. Pausandra trianae (Müll.Arg.) Baill. - widespread from Honduras to Bolivia

formerly included

moved to Dodecastigma

- P. integrifolia - Dodecastigma integrifolium
