= Fontainea subpapuana =

Scientific classification
- Kingdom: Plantae
- Clade: Tracheophytes
- Clade: Angiosperms
- Clade: Eudicots
- Clade: Rosids
- Order: Malpighiales
- Family: Euphorbiaceae
- Genus: Fontainea
- Species: F. subpapuana

Binomial name
- Fontainea subpapuana P.I.Forst.

Species of plant

Fontainea subpapuana is a small tree endemic to Papua New Guinea in the family, Euphorbiaceae, which grows to a height of 7 m.

== Description ==
Fontainea subpapuana is a small dioecious tree growing to 7 m. The colour of the stem exudate is red. New shoots have dense, antrorse (upward pointing) yellow trichomes. There are no stipules and the leaves have petioles, which are swollen at the apex. The upper surfaces of the leaves are dark-green and the lower surfaces, pale-green. There are 13-15 lateral veins on each side of the midrib and between these, the venation is reticulate. Neither male inflorescences, nor male flowers have been seen. The endocarp surfaces between the sutures are smooth and convex. The description given by Forster lacks significant details with respect to the male flowers and mature fruit.

This plant is very like Fontainea picrosperma, but differs in that it has 13-15 lateral veins on either side of the midrib versus 8–12; the base of the petiole is not swollen (vs swollen for F. picrosperma); the style is longer (3-3.5 mm vs 0.8–2 mm); the calyx of the male flower has four-five lobes (versus 2-3 lobes); and the faces between the sutures of the endocarp are wider (12–13 mm versus 7–10 mm for F. picrosperma.

== Distribution and habitat ==
Fontainea subpapuana is known only from the Central Province in south-east Papua New Guinea, in lowland rainforest on river flats.

== Taxonomy and naming ==
The plant was first described by Paul Irwin Forster in "Three new species of Fontainea Heckel (Euphorbiaceae) from Australia and Papua New Guinea". The holotype K000959474 was collected by H. Streiman and A, Kairo on May 6, 1971, in the Kuriva Forestry Area, near Veimauri Rr, in the Port Moresby subdistrict, Papua New Guinea, in lowland rainforest on river flats.

The specific epithet, subpapuana, derives from the Latin, sub- ("below"), and papuana ("of Papua"), and refers to the fact that this species is found on the south coast of Papua New Guinea.
