= Blachia =

Blachia is the scientific name for two genera of organisms and may refer to:

- Blachia (bug), a stink bug genus in the subfamily Asopinae
- Blachia (plant), a genus of plant in the family Euphorbiaceae
