= F. australis =

F. australis may refer to:

- Fabrosaurus australis, a herbivorous dinosaur species which lived during the Early Jurassic
- Flindersia australis, the crows ash or Australian teak, a rainforest tree species found in Australia
- Fontainea australis, Australian subtropical plant

== See also ==
- Australis (disambiguation)
