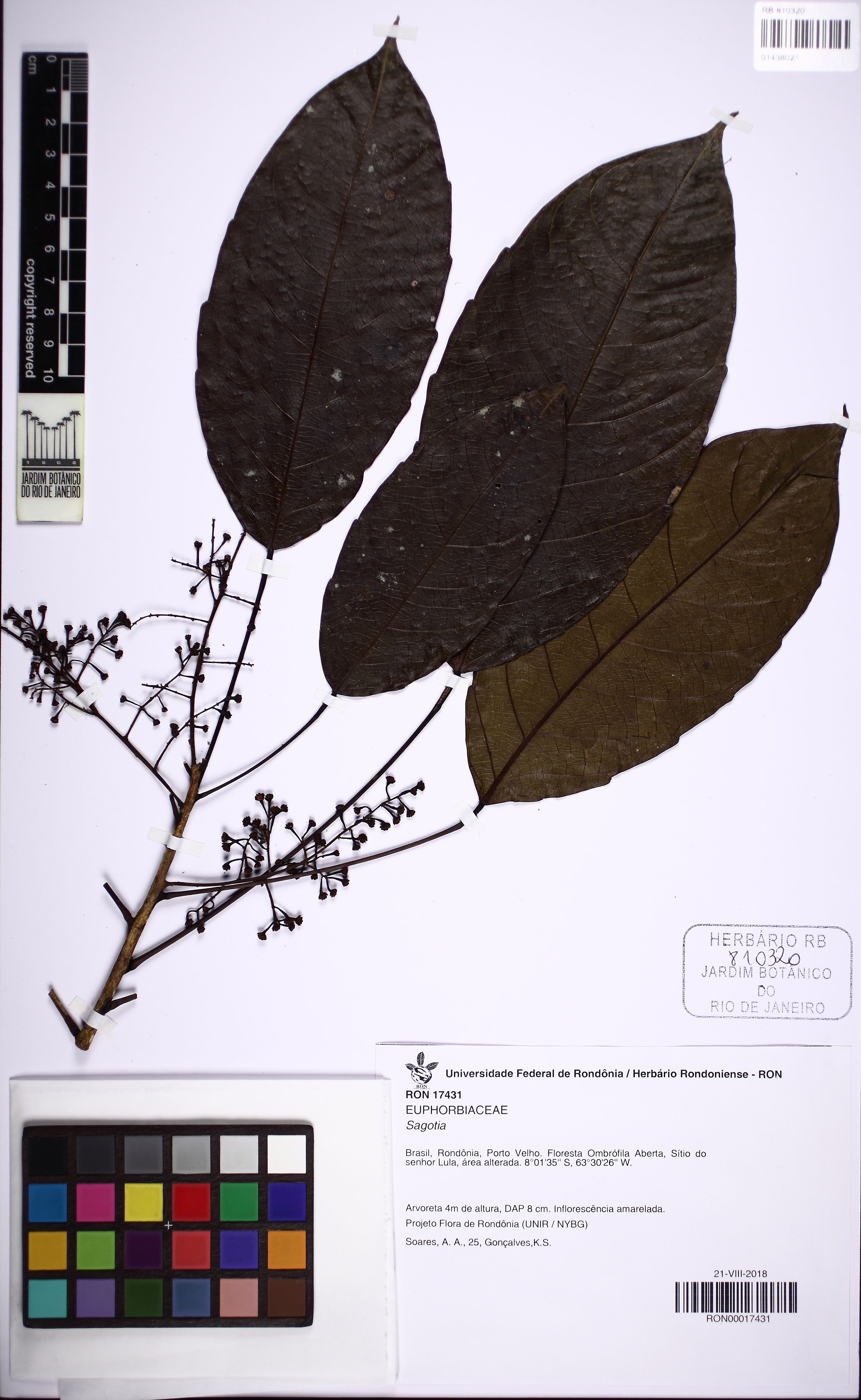

Scientific classification
- Kingdom: Plantae
- Clade: Tracheophytes
- Clade: Angiosperms
- Clade: Eudicots
- Clade: Rosids
- Order: Malpighiales
- Family: Euphorbiaceae
- Subfamily: Crotonoideae
- Tribe: Codiaeae
- Genus: Sagotia; Baill. 1860, conserved name, not Duchassaing & Walpers 1851 (Fabaceae)

= Sagotia =

Genus of flowering plants

Sagotia is a genus of plants under the family Euphorbiaceae first described as a genus in 1860. It is native to northern South America.

Species

- Sagotia brachysepala (Müll.Arg.) Secco - French Guinea, Suriname, Guyana, Venezuela, Colombia, Brazil
- Sagotia racemosa Baill. - French Guinea, Suriname, Guyana, Venezuela, Colombia, Ecuador, Brazil; possibly Panama + Costa Rica

Formerly included

moved to Morierina (Rubiaceae)

- Sagotia gardenioides - Morierina montana (Rubiaceae)

Names in homonym genus

In 1851, Duchassaing & Walpers used the same generic name, Sagotia, to refer to a very different plant. Ordinarily, the rules of nomenclature mandate that the older name should be considered legitimate, while the newer one would need to be abandoned. In this case, however, the decision was made to conserve the newer name and reject the older one. Thus the one name in the older name was changed as follows:

- Sagotia triflora (L.) Duchass. & Walp. - Desmodium triflorum (L.) DC.
