= Opopaea mollis =

Scientific classification
- Kingdom: Animalia
- Phylum: Arthropoda
- Subphylum: Chelicerata
- Class: Arachnida
- Order: Araneae
- Infraorder: Araneomorphae
- Family: Oonopidae
- Genus: Opopaea
- Species: O. mollis

Binomial name
- Opopaea mollis (Simon, 1907)

Synonyms
- Epectris mollis Simon, 1907

Species of spider

Opopaea mollis, is a species of spider of the genus Opopaea. The species is native to Sri Lanka.
