= Pantadenia =

Scientific classification
- Kingdom: Plantae
- Clade: Tracheophytes
- Clade: Angiosperms
- Clade: Eudicots
- Clade: Rosids
- Order: Malpighiales
- Family: Euphorbiaceae
- Subfamily: Crotonoideae
- Tribe: Codiaeae
- Genus: Pantadenia; Gagnep.

Synonyms
- Parapantadenia Capuron

Genus of flowering plants

Pantadenia is a genus of plants under the family Euphorbiaceae first described as a genus in 1925. It is native to Madagascar and Indochina.

Species

1. Pantadenia adenanthera Gagnep. - Cambodia, Laos, Thailand, Vietnam
2. Pantadenia chauvetiae (Leandri & Capuron) G.L.Webster - Madagascar
3. Pantadenia gervaisii R.Rabev. & McPherson - Madagascar
