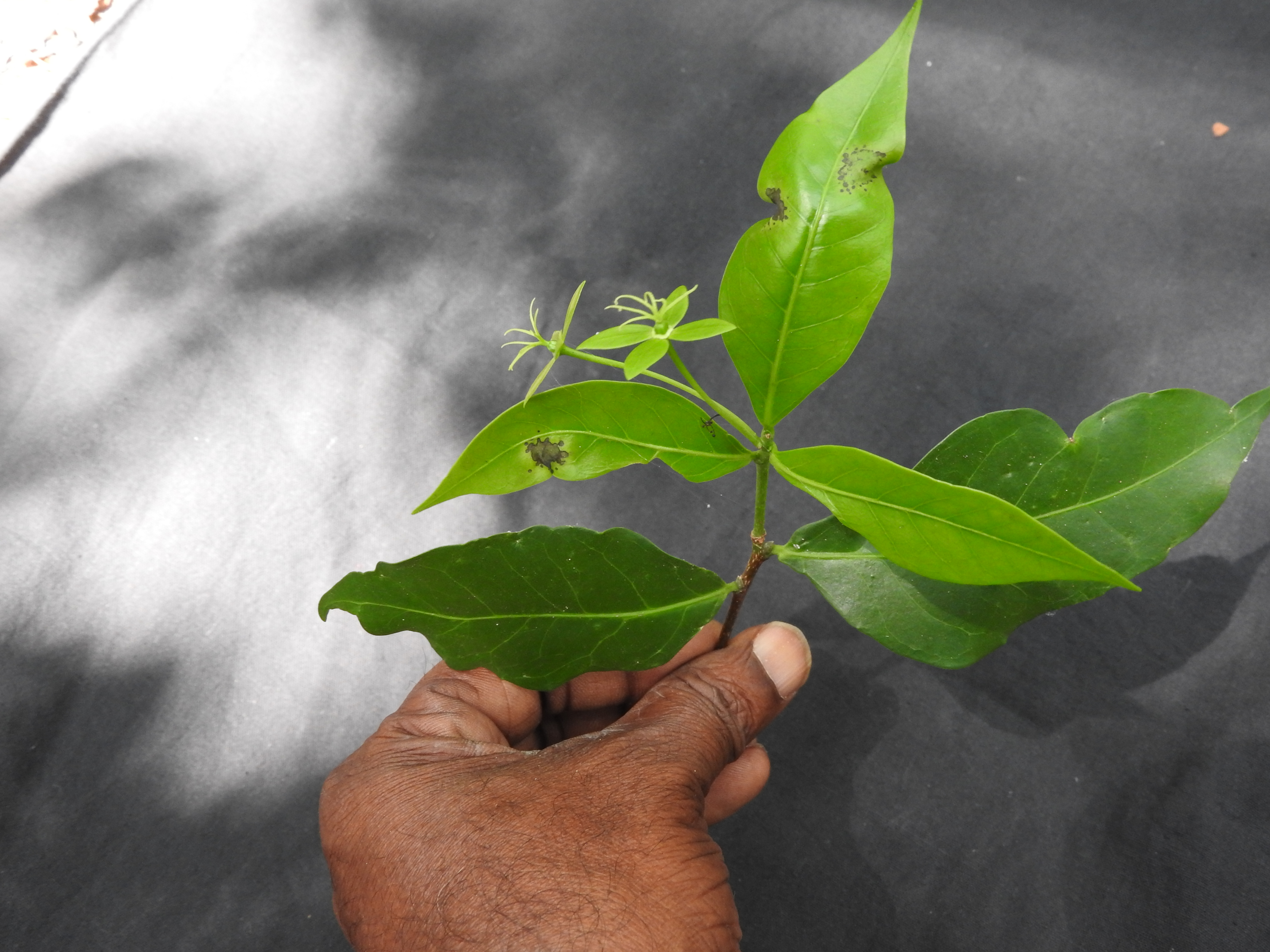

Scientific classification
- Kingdom: Plantae
- Clade: Tracheophytes
- Clade: Angiosperms
- Clade: Eudicots
- Clade: Rosids
- Order: Malpighiales
- Family: Euphorbiaceae
- Genus: Blachia
- Species: B. umbellata

Binomial name
- Blachia umbellata (Willd.) Baill.

Synonyms
- Blachia reflexa Benth.; Codiaeum umbellatum (Willd.) Müll.Arg.; Croton umbellatus Willd.

= Blachia umbellata =

Species of flowering plant

Blachia umbellata is a species of plants under the family Euphorbiaceae. It is native to India and Sri Lanka. Trees from this species can grow up to 15 m (49 ft) tall. This plant is known as "Kosatta - කොස් අත්ත or කොසට්ට" by Sinhalese people in Sri Lanka.
