= Pantadenia adenanthera =

Scientific classification
- Kingdom: Plantae
- Clade: Tracheophytes
- Clade: Angiosperms
- Clade: Eudicots
- Clade: Rosids
- Order: Malpighiales
- Family: Euphorbiaceae
- Genus: Pantadenia
- Species: P. adenanthera

Binomial name
- Pantadenia adenanthera Gagnep.

Species of shrub from Southeast Asia

Pantadenia adenanthera is a shrub in the Euphorbiaceae family. It is found in parts of Southeast Asia. The species is used for its wood (high-quality house-posts, firewood) and edible fruit.

== Description ==
This species grows as a perennial shrub, between 0.4 and 2 m (1.3 and 6.6 ft) tall, branching prolifically. The species can be distinguished from other Euphorbiaceae in Thailand by the following traits: the inflorescences grow opposite the leaves; petals have apical glands; and the stamens also have an apical gland. Flowering occurs from July to January, fruit appear from November to March, while leafing occurs from May to April.

== Distribution ==
Growing in parts of Southeast Asia, the species is found in the following countries: Thailand, Cambodia, Laos, Vietnam.

== Habitat, ecology ==
In Cambodia and southern Vietnam the shrub grows in secondary formations in the plains, and along rivers.

The shrub grows along the Mekong river in Kratie and Steung Treng Provinces, Cambodia. It is moderately abundant in the deciduous forest with bamboo formation and in degraded areas, on soils derived from metamorphic sandstone bedrock, at 25–30 m (82–98 ft) altitude.

== Vernacular names ==
The plant is called: (voër) krâchâk ânndaëk (="turtle claw"), or krâcâk (Khmer) in Cambodia.

== Uses ==
The fruit are edible, and the branches are used for firewood in Cambodia.

Cambodian house-making carpenters value the hard, heavy and rot- and insect-proof, though not cheap, wood of this species as the raw material for the posts. The posts are set in the ground and support the frame and floor. It is thought that the choice of quality wood will not only help the solidity of the house, but will increase the happiness of the resident family.

== History ==
François Gagnepain (1866–1952), a long-lived and prolific French botanist, described this species in the paper "Quelques genres nouveaux d'Euphorbiacées" in an issue of the Bulletin de la Société botanique de France published in 1925 (though dated 1924).
