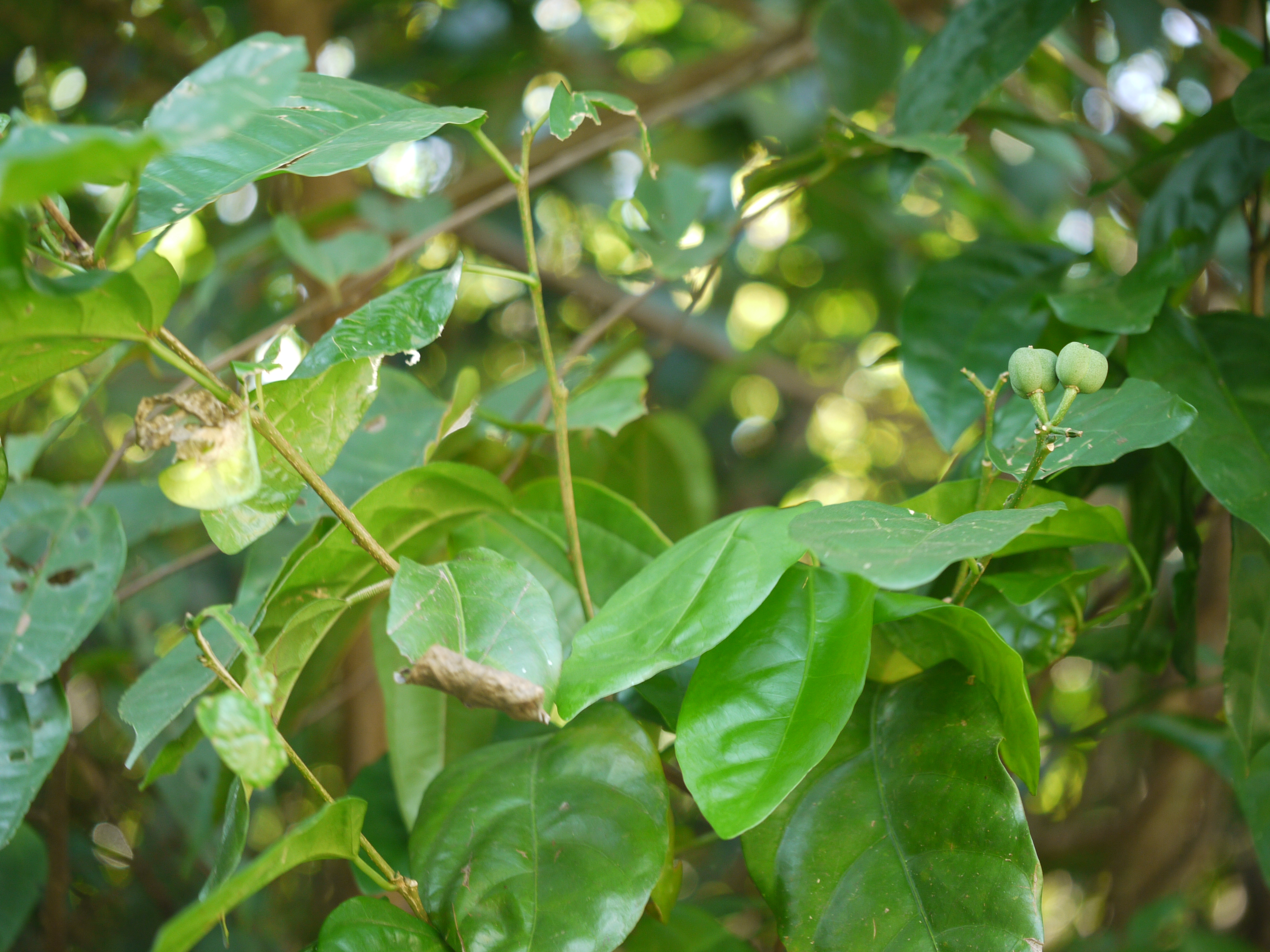
- Blachia andamanica

Scientific classification
- Kingdom: Plantae
- Clade: Tracheophytes
- Clade: Angiosperms
- Clade: Eudicots
- Clade: Rosids
- Order: Malpighiales
- Family: Euphorbiaceae
- Subfamily: Crotonoideae
- Tribe: Codiaeae
- Genus: Blachia; Baill., conserved name

Synonyms
- Bruxanellia Dennst. ex Kostel., rejected name; Deonia Pierre ex Pax

= Blachia (plant) =

Genus of flowering plants

Blachia is a genus of plants under the family Euphorbiaceae first described as a genus in 1858. It is native to Southeast Asia, southern China, and the Indian subcontinent.

Species

1. Blachia andamanica - Andaman & Nicobar, S China, Assam, Bangladesh, E India, Indochina, Malaysia, Indonesia, Philippines
2. Blachia calycina - SW India
3. Blachia cotoneaster - Laos
4. Blachia jatrophifolia - Hainan, Vietnam
5. Blachia longzhouensis - Guangxi
6. Blachia pentzii - Guangdong, Hainan, Vietnam
7. Blachia poilanei - Vietnam
8. Blachia siamensis - S Thailand, Hainan
9. Blachia thorelii - Laos
10. Blachia umbellata - SW India, Sri Lanka

Formerly included

moved to other genera: Strophioblachia, Trigonostemon

1. Blachia glandulosa - Strophioblachia fimbricalyx
2. Blachia viridissima - Trigonostemon viridissimus

== Gallery ==
The following images all correspond to Blachia andamanica.

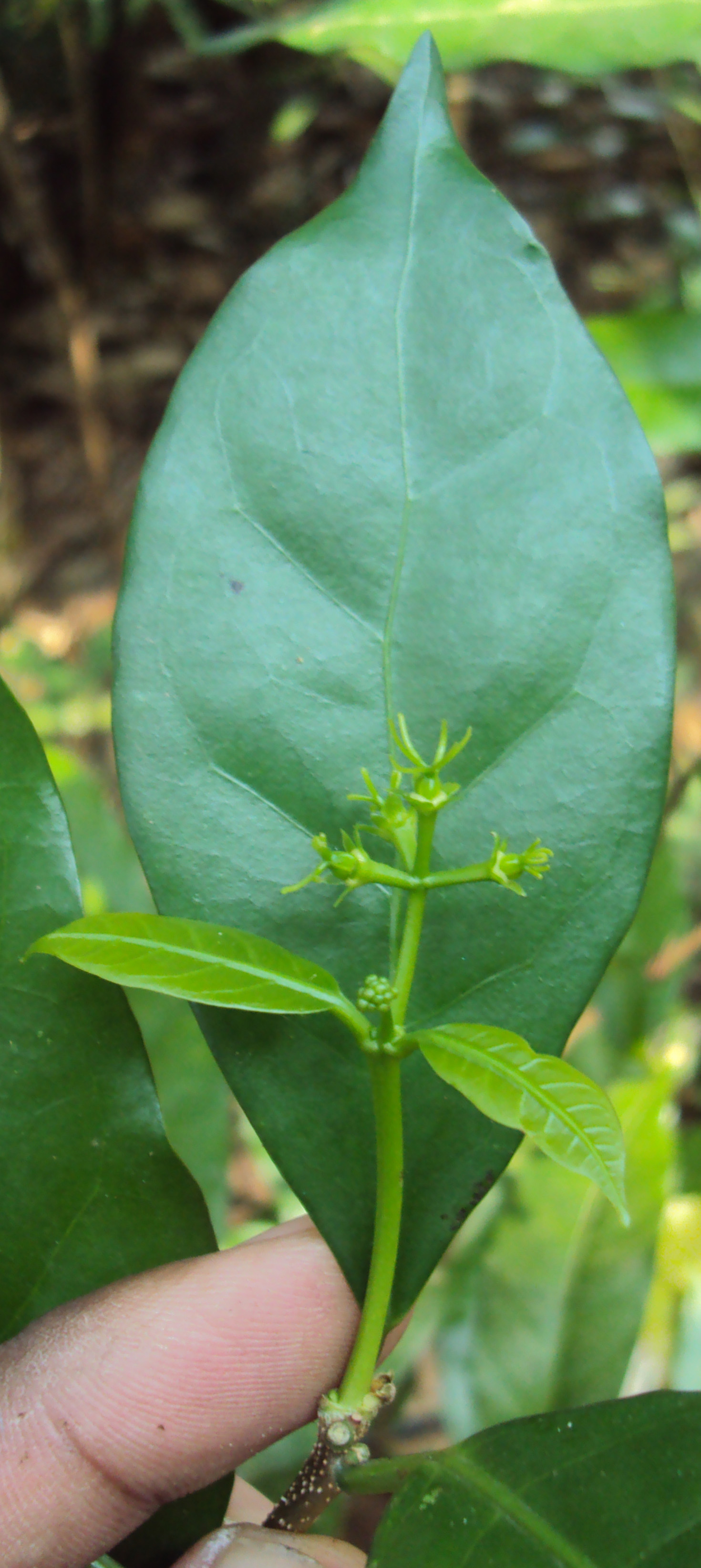

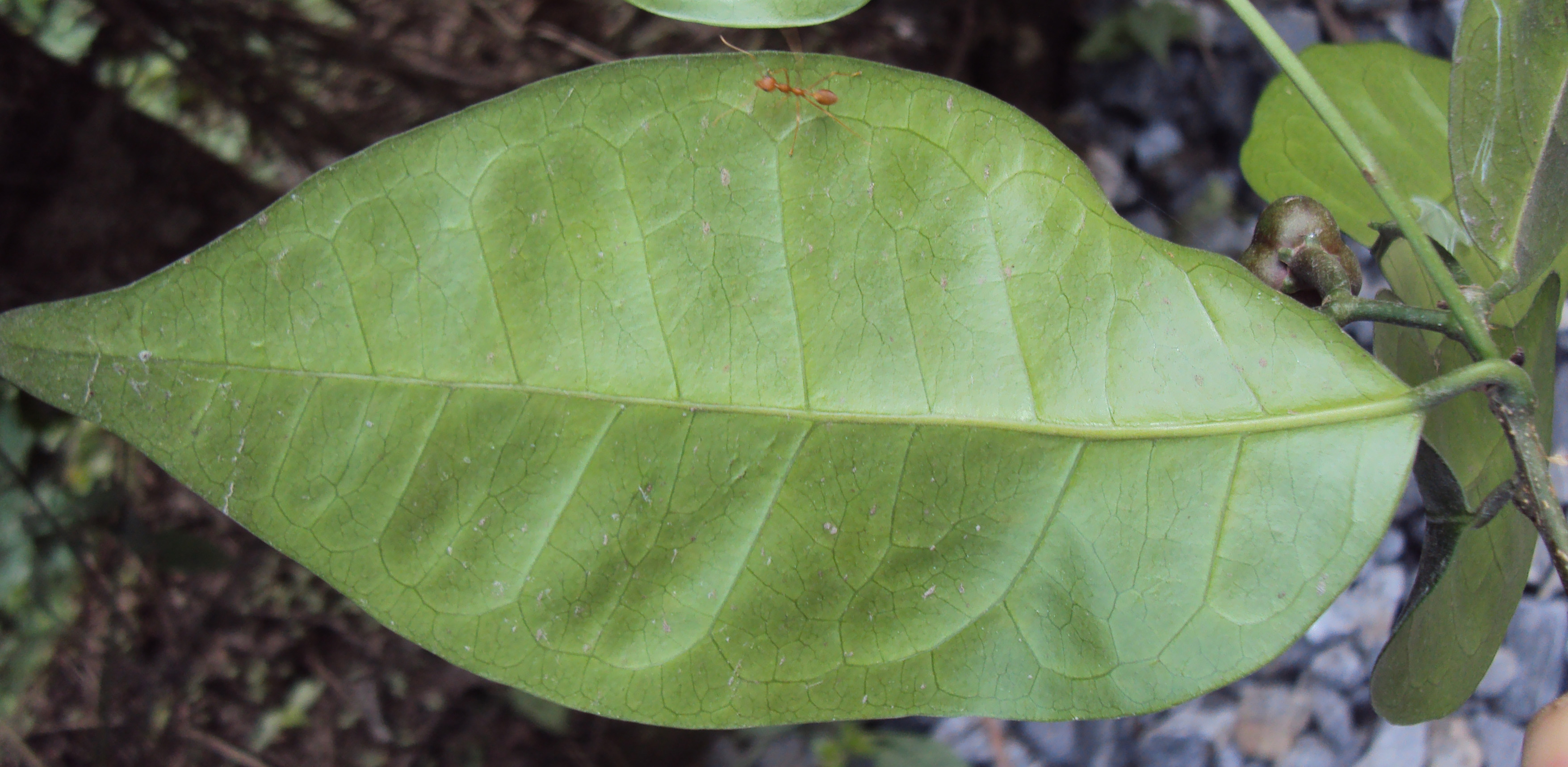

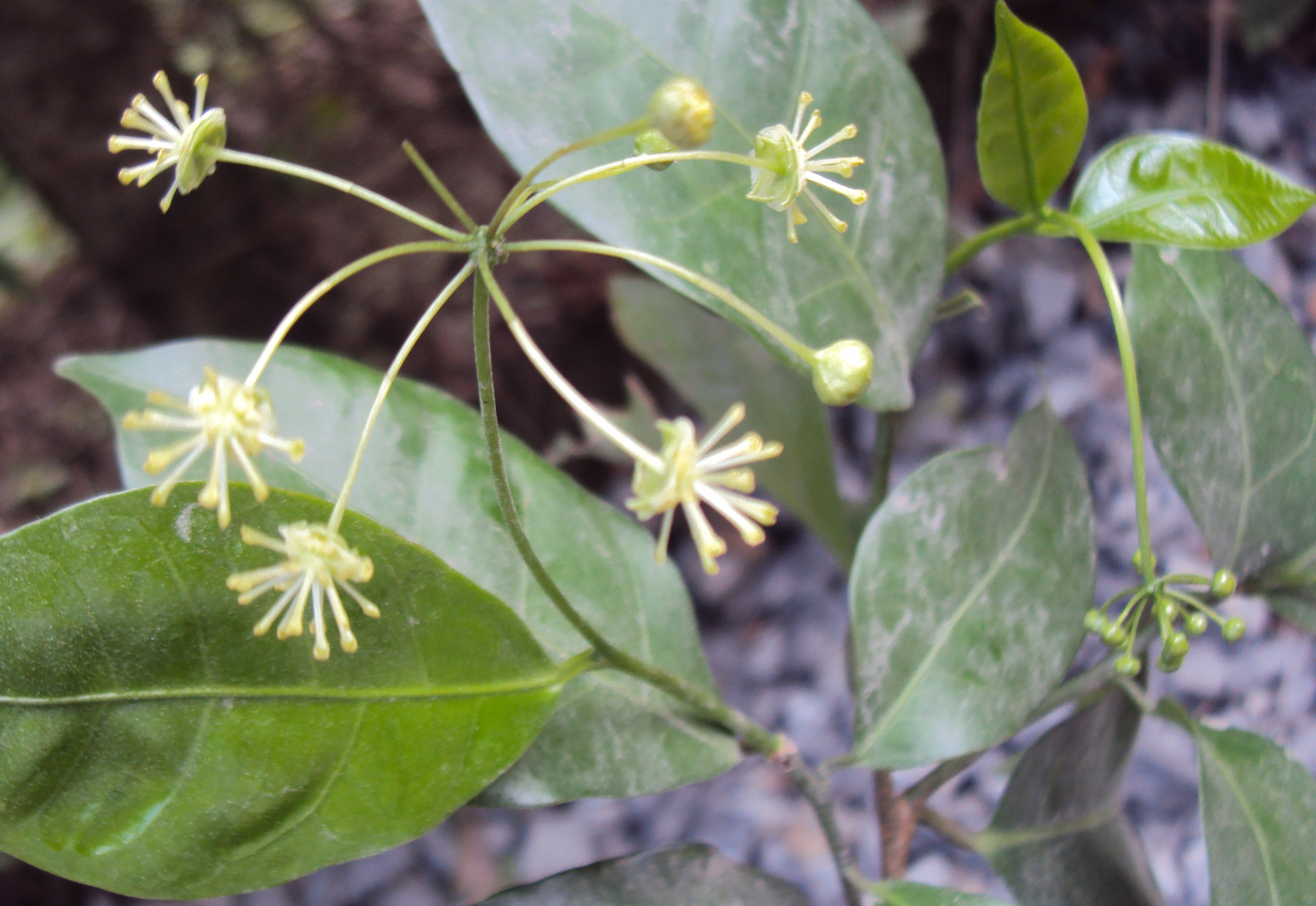

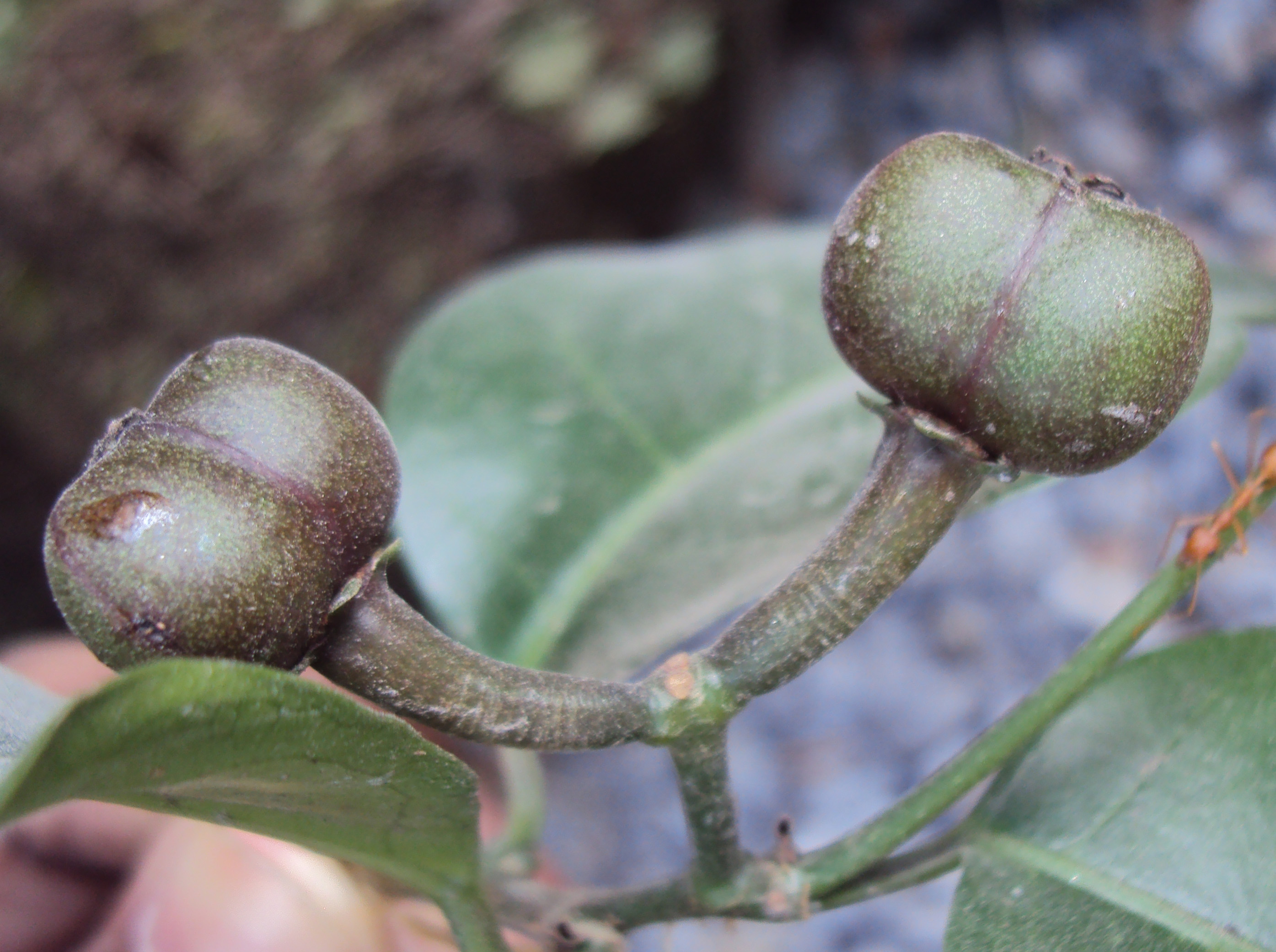
