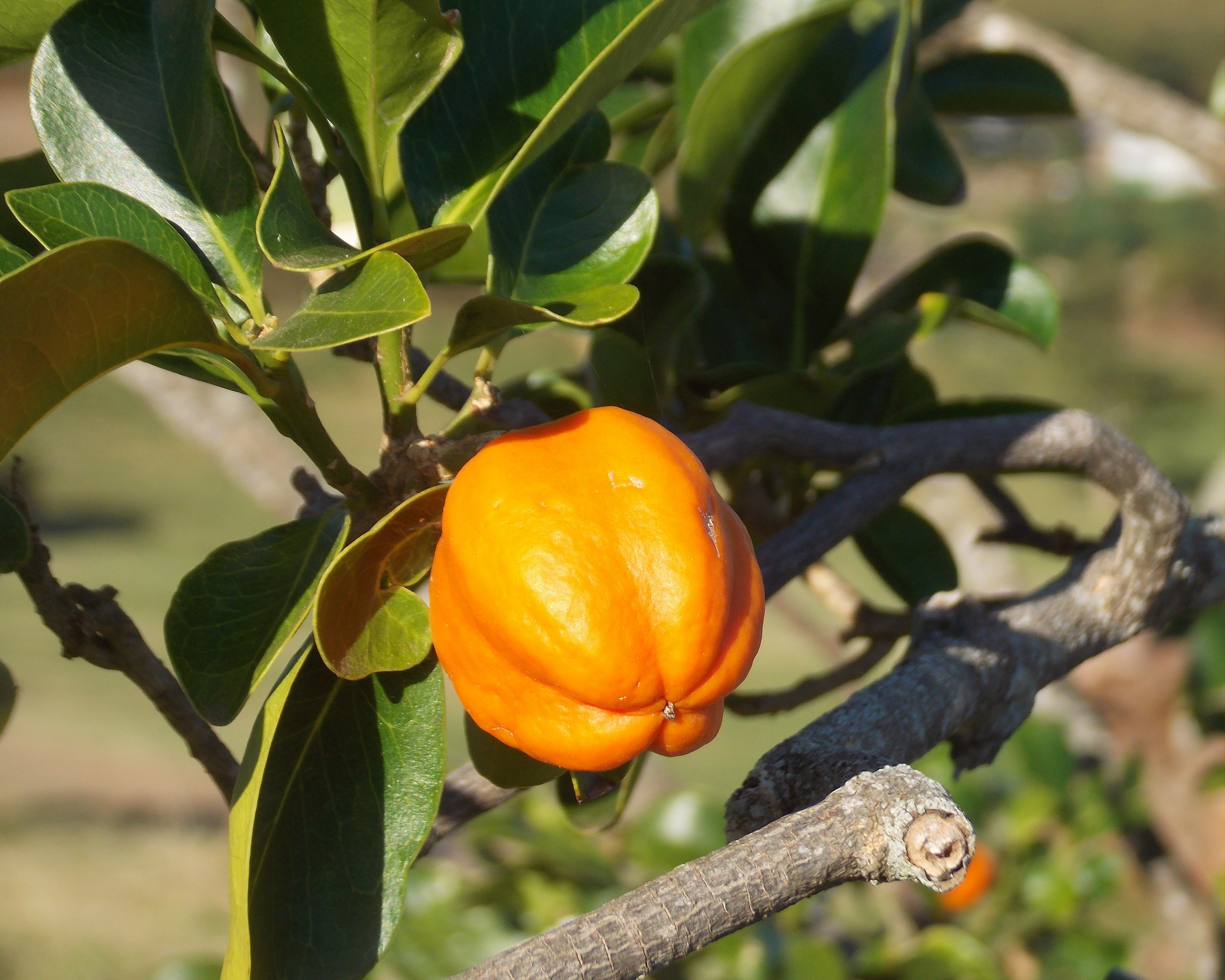

Scientific classification
- Kingdom: Plantae
- Clade: Tracheophytes
- Clade: Angiosperms
- Clade: Eudicots
- Clade: Rosids
- Order: Malpighiales
- Family: Euphorbiaceae
- Genus: Fontainea
- Species: F. pancheri

Binomial name
- Fontainea pancheri (Baill.) Heckel

Synonyms
- Baloghia pancheri Baill.; Codiaeum pancheri (Baill.) Müll.Arg.

= Fontainea pancheri =

Species of plant

Fontainea pancheri is a small tree or shrub endemic to New Caledonia in the family, Euphorbiaceae, which grows to a height of 15 m.

== Description ==
Fontainea pancheri is a small dioecious tree growing to 15 m. The colour of the stem exudate is clear or reddish-brown. Both male and female flowers are white. Male flowers have 18 - 32 stamens and occur in well furnished bunches. The female inflorescences are considerably meaner.

== Distribution and habitat ==
Fontainea pancheri is common on the Grande Terre.

== Taxonomy and naming ==
The plant was first described in 1862 by Henri Ernest Baillon in the journal Adansonia. The name was changed by Édouard Marie Heckel in 1870 when he described the genus, Fontainea in "Étude au point de vue Botanique et Thérapeutique sur la Fontainea pancheri (Nobis)".

The specific epithet, pancheri, derives from the name "Pancher" and honours the botanist Jean Armand Isidore Pancher who worked in New Caledonia.
