= Acidocroton gentryi =

Conservation status
- Endangered (IUCN 2.3)

Scientific classification
- Kingdom: Plantae
- Clade: Tracheophytes
- Clade: Angiosperms
- Clade: Eudicots
- Clade: Rosids
- Order: Malpighiales
- Family: Euphorbiaceae
- Genus: Acidocroton
- Species: A. gentryi

Binomial name
- Acidocroton gentryi Fern. Alonso & R.Jaram.

Species of flowering plant

Acidocroton gentryi is a species of plant in the family Euphorbiaceae. It is endemic to Colombia.
