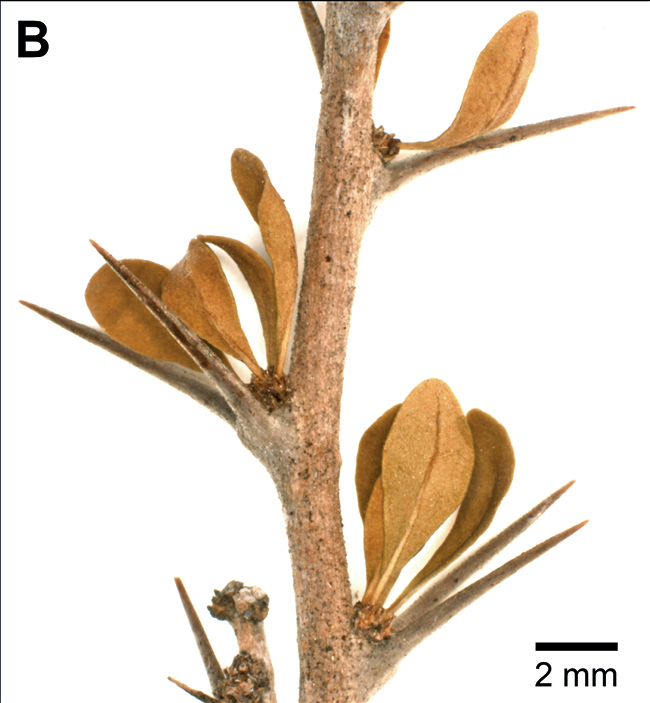

Conservation status
- Vulnerable (IUCN 2.3)

Scientific classification
- Kingdom: Plantae
- Clade: Tracheophytes
- Clade: Angiosperms
- Clade: Eudicots
- Clade: Rosids
- Order: Malpighiales
- Family: Euphorbiaceae
- Genus: Acidocroton
- Species: A. verrucosus

Binomial name
- Acidocroton verrucosus Urb.

= Acidocroton verrucosus =

Species of flowering plant

Acidocroton verrucosus is a species of flowering plant in the family Euphorbiaceae. It is a tree endemic to Jamaica.
