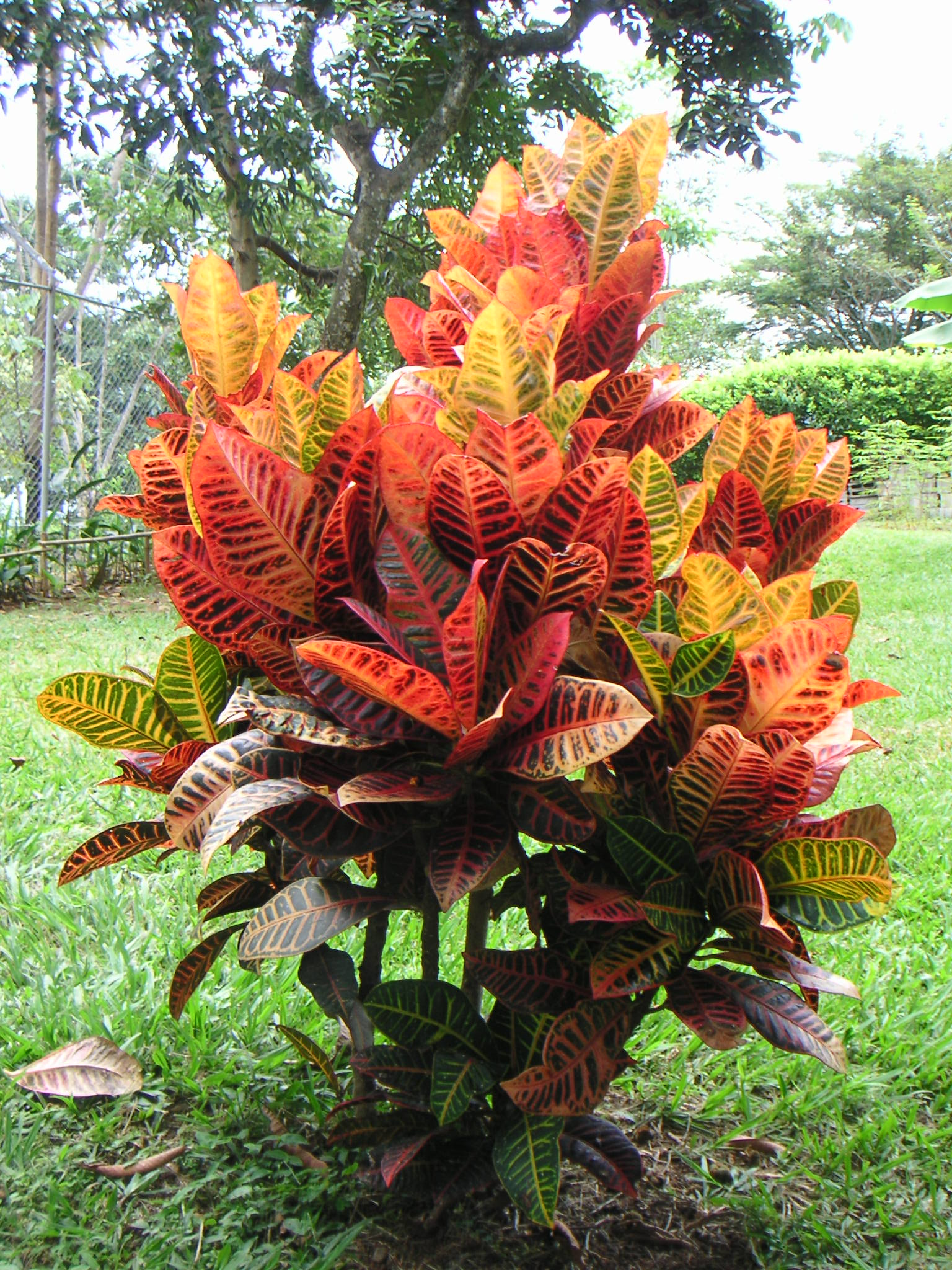
- Codiaeum variegatum

Scientific classification
- Kingdom: Plantae
- Clade: Tracheophytes
- Clade: Angiosperms
- Clade: Eudicots
- Clade: Rosids
- Order: Malpighiales
- Family: Euphorbiaceae
- Subfamily: Crotonoideae
- Tribe: Codiaeae; Hutch.

Genera
- Acidocroton; Baliospermum; Baloghia; Blachia; Codiaeum; Colobocarpos; Dimorphocalyx; Dodecastigma; Fontainea; Hylandia; Ophellantha; Ostodes; Pantadenia; Pausandra; Sagotia; Strophioblachia

= Codiaeae =

Tribe of flowering plants

Codiaeae is a tribe of the subfamily Crotonoideae, under the family Euphorbiaceae. It comprises 15 genera.

== See also ==
- Taxonomy of the Euphorbiaceae
