= Dodecastigma =

Scientific classification
- Kingdom: Plantae
- Clade: Tracheophytes
- Clade: Angiosperms
- Clade: Eudicots
- Clade: Rosids
- Order: Malpighiales
- Family: Euphorbiaceae
- Subfamily: Crotonoideae
- Tribe: Codiaeae
- Genus: Dodecastigma; Ducke

Synonyms
- Anomalocalyx Ducke

Genus of flowering plants

Dodecastigma is a genus of plants under the family Euphorbiaceae first described as a genus in 1932. It is native to northern South America.

Species

1. Dodecastigma amazonicum Ducke - Amazonas State in Brazil
2. Dodecastigma integrifolium (Lanj.) Lanj. & Sandwith - French Guiana, Guyana, N Brazil
3. Dodecastigma uleanum (Pax & K.Hoffm.) G.L.Webster - Amazonas, Amapá
