= Pomaderris clivicola =

Scientific classification
- Kingdom: Plantae
- Clade: Tracheophytes
- Clade: Angiosperms
- Clade: Eudicots
- Clade: Rosids
- Order: Rosales
- Family: Rhamnaceae
- Genus: Pomaderris
- Species: P. clivicola

Binomial name
- Pomaderris clivicola (Benth.) N.A.Wakef.

Species of flowering plant

Pomaderris clivicola is a species of flowering plant in the family Rhamnaceae and is endemic to a restricted area of Queensland. It is a multi-stemmed shrub with softly-hairy twigs, egg-shaped leaves, and small panicles of yellow to cream-coloured flowers.

== Description ==
Pomaderris clivicola is a multi-stemmed shrub that typically grows to a height of 3–4 m (9.8–13.1 ft), its twigs densely covered with soft hairs. The leaves are egg-shaped, 15–32 mm (0.59–1.26 in) long and 6–12 mm (0.24–0.47 in) wide on a petiole 2.5–4.5 mm (0.098–0.177 in) long with narrow triangular stipules at the base. The upper surface of the leaves is densely covered with velvety hairs and the lower surface softly-hairy. The flowers are borne in small panicles 7–20 mm (0.28–0.79 in) long, each flower on a pedicel 2–3 mm (0.079–0.118 in) long. The sepals are yellow to cream-coloured, 1.2–2.0 mm (0.047–0.079 in) long and there are no petals. Flowering occurs from December to January and the fruit is a hairy capsule about 2 mm (0.079 in) long.

== Taxonomy ==
This pomaderris was first formally described in 1863 by George Bentham who gave it the name Pomaderris ferruginea var. canescens in Flora Australiensis from specimens collected on Percy Island by Allan Cunningham. In 1951, Norman Arthur Wakefield raised the variety to species status as Pomaderris canescens in The Victorian Naturalist. The specific epithet (clivicola) means "slopes-dweller".

== Distribution and habitat ==
Pomaderris clivicola is only known from near Gayndah where it grows in open forest near rock outcrops, and near Coalstoun Lakes where it is found in open forest and in dry scrub.

== Conservation status ==
This pomaderris is listed as "vulnerable" under the Australian Government Environment Protection and Biodiversity Conservation Act 1999 and as "endangered" under the Queensland Government Nature Conservation Act 1992. The main threats to the species include weed invasion, cattle grazing, roadworks and inappropriate fire regimes.

One population was threatened by roadworks on the Humphery-Binjour Road in Gayndah in 2013.
