= Strophioblachia =

Conservation status
- Least Concern (IUCN 3.1)

Scientific classification
- Kingdom: Plantae
- Clade: Tracheophytes
- Clade: Angiosperms
- Clade: Eudicots
- Clade: Rosids
- Order: Malpighiales
- Family: Euphorbiaceae
- Subfamily: Crotonoideae
- Tribe: Codiaeae
- Genus: Strophioblachia; Boerl.
- Species: S. fimbricalyx

Binomial name
- Strophioblachia fimbricalyx Boerl.

Synonyms
- Blachia glandulosa Pierre ex Pax; Strophioblachia glandulosa Pax; Strophioblachia glandulosa var. tonkinensis Gagnep.; Strophioblachia fimbricalyx var. efimbriata Airy Shaw; Strophioblachia glandulosa var. cordifolia Airy Shaw; Strophioblachia fimbricalyx var. cordifolia (Airy Shaw) H.S.Kiu

Genus of plants in the spurge family

Strophioblachia is a genus of plants in the family Euphorbiaceae first described as a genus in 1900. It contains only one known species, Strophioblachia fimbricalyx, native to southern China (Yunnan, Guangxi), E Indochina (Vietnam, Cambodia, Thailand), the Philippines, and Sulawesi.
