= Colobocarpos =

Scientific classification
- Kingdom: Plantae
- Clade: Tracheophytes
- Clade: Angiosperms
- Clade: Eudicots
- Clade: Rosids
- Order: Malpighiales
- Family: Euphorbiaceae
- Subfamily: Crotonoideae
- Tribe: Codiaeae
- Genus: Colobocarpos; Esser & Welzen
- Species: C. nanus

Binomial name
- Colobocarpos nanus (Gagnep.) Esser & Welzen

Synonyms
- Croton nanus Gagnep.; Croton colobocarpus Airy Shaw

Genus of flowering plants

Colobocarpos is a monotypic plant genus of the family Euphorbiaceae. The sole species is Colobocarpos nanus. It is native to Laos and Northern Thailand.
