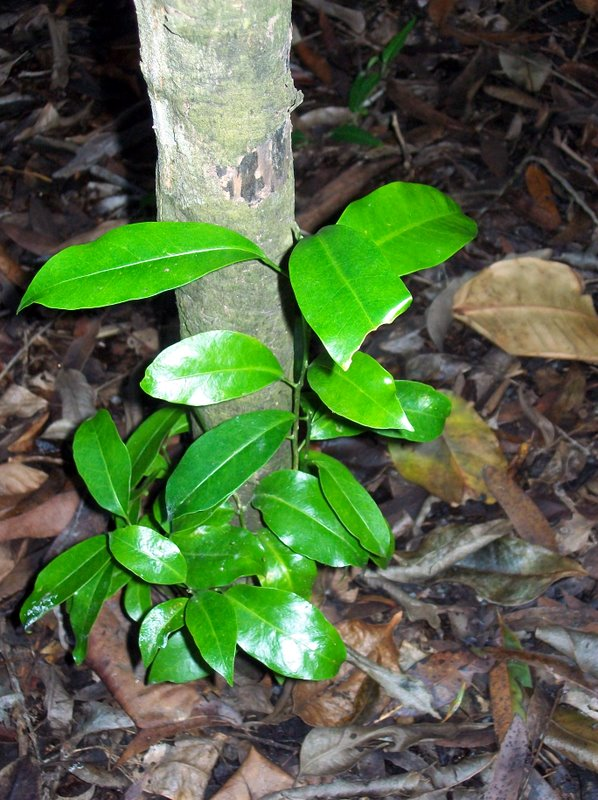
- New growth at the base of Fontainea oraria

Conservation status
- Critically endangered (EPBC Act)

Scientific classification
- Kingdom: Plantae
- Clade: Tracheophytes
- Clade: Angiosperms
- Clade: Eudicots
- Clade: Rosids
- Order: Malpighiales
- Family: Euphorbiaceae
- Genus: Fontainea
- Species: F. oraria

Binomial name
- Fontainea oraria Jessup & Guymer

= Fontainea oraria =

Species of tree

Fontainea oraria is a rare rainforest plant growing near the sea on private property near Lennox Head, New South Wales, Australia. The common name is coast fontainea.

A survey in 2005 found there are only ten mature plants, and 45 seedlings or juveniles. Fontainea oraria is listed as critically endangered by extinction.
