= Ophellantha =

Scientific classification
- Kingdom: Plantae
- Clade: Tracheophytes
- Clade: Angiosperms
- Clade: Eudicots
- Clade: Rosids
- Order: Malpighiales
- Family: Euphorbiaceae
- Subfamily: Crotonoideae
- Tribe: Codiaeae
- Genus: Ophellantha; Standl.

Synonyms
- Acidocroton sect. Ophellantha (Standl.) G.L. Webster

Genus of flowering plants

Ophellantha is a genus of plants under the family Euphorbiaceae first described as a genus in 1924. It is native to southern Mexico and northern Central America.

Species

1. Ophellantha spinosa Standl. - Honduras, El Salvador, Chiapas, Veracruz
2. Ophellantha steyermarkii Standl. - Guatemala, Chiapas
