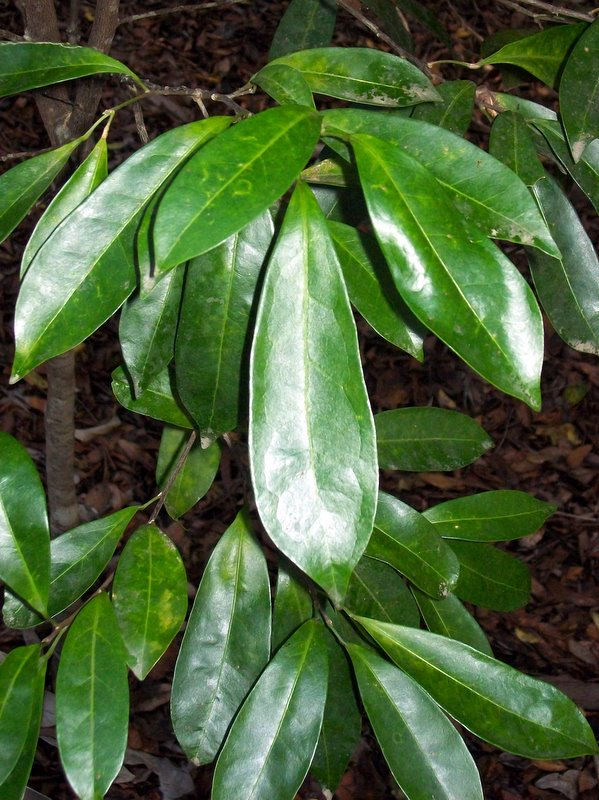

Conservation status
- Vulnerable (EPBC Act)

Scientific classification
- Kingdom: Plantae
- Clade: Tracheophytes
- Clade: Angiosperms
- Clade: Eudicots
- Clade: Rosids
- Order: Malpighiales
- Family: Euphorbiaceae
- Genus: Fontainea
- Species: F. australis

Binomial name
- Fontainea australis Jessup & Guymer

= Fontainea australis =

Species of tree

Fontainea australis is a rare rainforest plant from eastern Australia. The common name is southern fontainea.

== Habitat and distribution ==
It grows in sub tropical rainforest at low altitudes on basaltic alluvial soils. Distributed from the Wilsons River (New South Wales) to the Tallebudgera Valley in south eastern Queensland.

== Description ==
A shrub or small tree to 5 metres tall. Leaves are 6 to 9 cm long and 2 to 3.5 cm wide, alternate on the stem. Reverse ovate or elliptic in shape with a long leaf tip, and narrow wedge shaped at the leaf base. The leaf stalk are between 5 and 21 mm long, swollen at both ends, and somewhat channelled. Small white flowers appear on panicles flowers December to January. The fruit matures in July, being a red fleshy ovate shaped capsule, 2.3 cm in diameter.

== Conservation Status ==
Fontainea australis is classified as "vulnerable" under the Australian Government Environment Protection and Biodiversity Conservation Act 1999 and as "vulnerable" under the Queensland Government Nature Conservation Act 1992.
