= Hylandia =

Blushwood

Scientific classification
- Kingdom: Plantae
- Clade: Tracheophytes
- Clade: Angiosperms
- Clade: Eudicots
- Clade: Rosids
- Order: Malpighiales
- Family: Euphorbiaceae
- Subfamily: Crotonoideae
- Tribe: Codiaeae
- Genus: Hylandia; Airy Shaw
- Species: H. dockrillii

Binomial name
- Hylandia dockrillii Airy Shaw

Genus of flowering plants

Hylandia is a genus of plants, of the family Euphorbiaceae, named in honour of Australian botanist Bernie Hyland, by Herbert K. Airy Shaw.

Hylandia dockrillii, sometimes referred to as blushwood, is a species in the family Euphorbiaceae; the common name is also used for the related species Fontainea picrosperma, from which tigilanol tiglate (EBC-46) is derived. It is native to the Cook region in Queensland, Australia.
