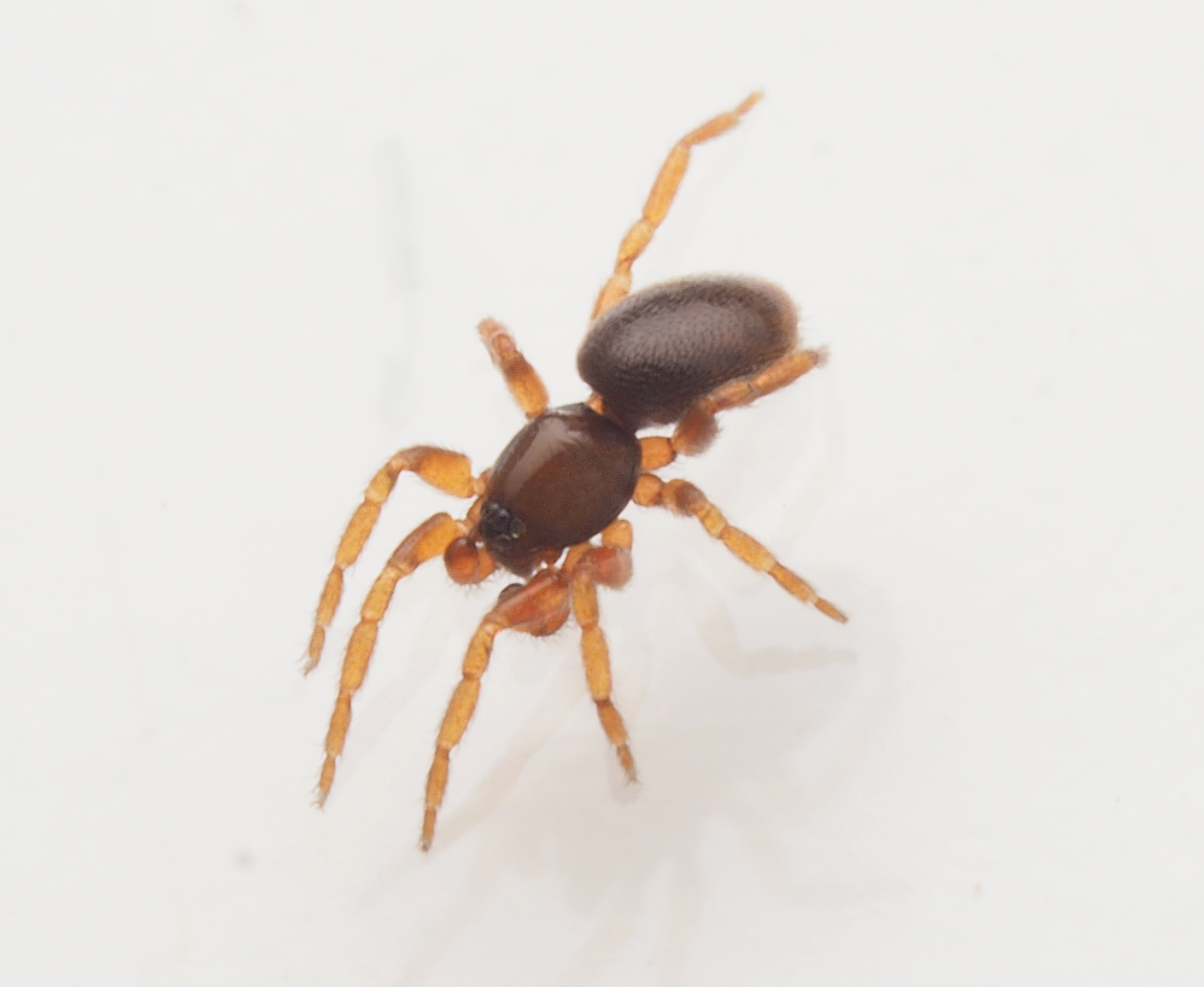
- Opapaea sp. in Australia
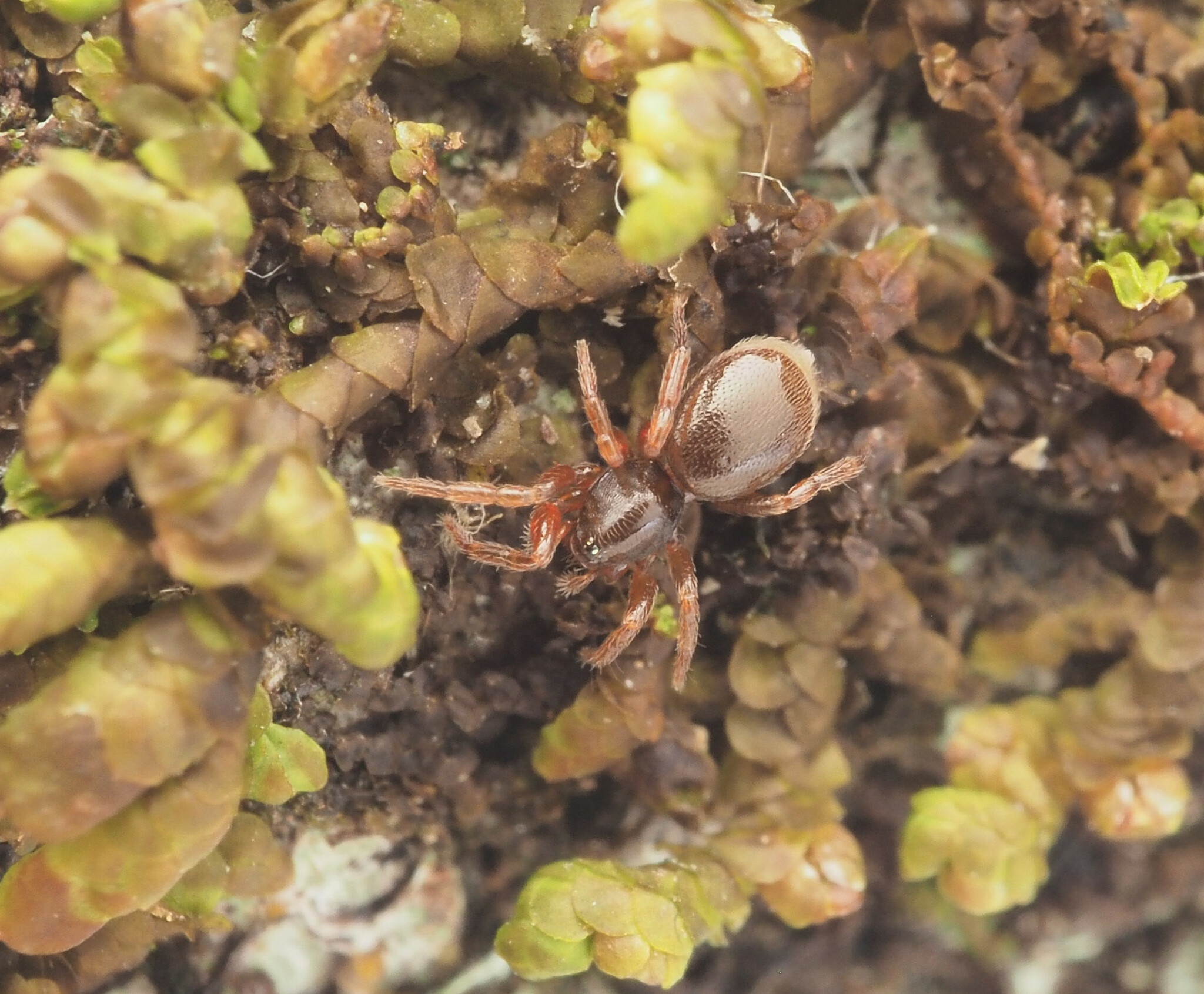
- Opapaea sp. in Australia

Scientific classification
- Kingdom: Animalia
- Phylum: Arthropoda
- Subphylum: Chelicerata
- Class: Arachnida
- Order: Araneae
- Infraorder: Araneomorphae
- Family: Oonopidae
- Genus: Opopaea; Simon, 1891

Type species
- Opopaea apicalis (Simon, 1893)

Diversity
- 190 species

Synonyms
- Myrmecoscaphiella; Mello-Leitão, 1926

= Opopaea =

Opopaea Temporal range: Neogene–present

Genus of spiders

Opopaea is a genus of goblin spiders of the family Oonopidae. The genus is one of the largest within the family, with almost two hundred accepted species.

== Description ==
Spiders of the genus are very small, less than 2 mm long. They are usually a reddish-brown color. They have six eyes: four posterior in a straight row, and two anterior.

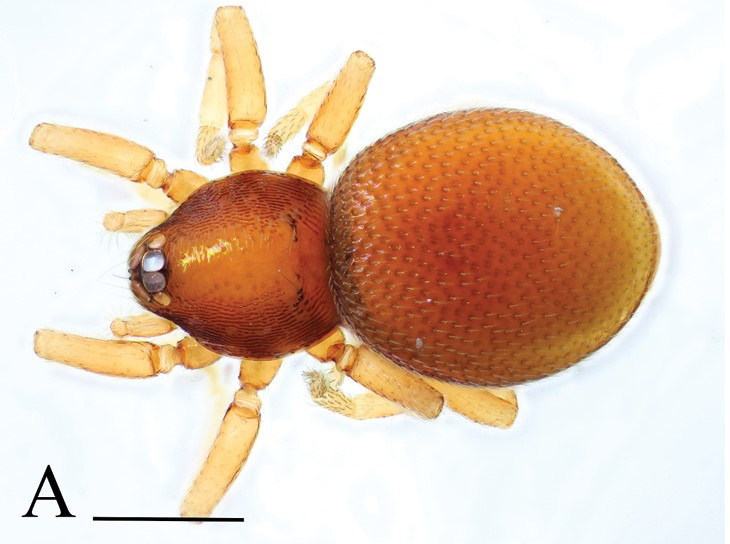
Opopaea berlandi

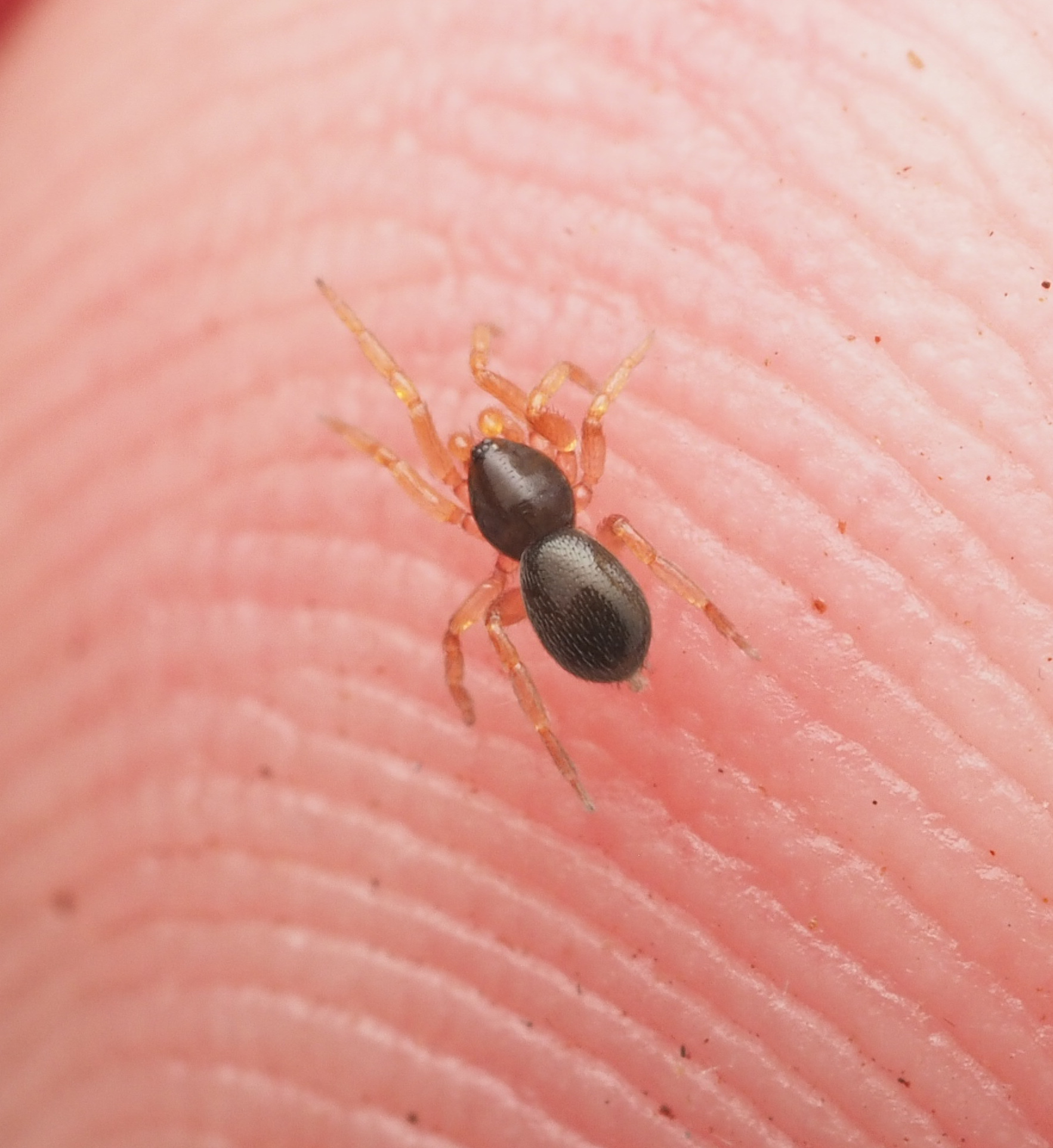
Opopaea sp. in Australia

== Species ==
As of October 2025, this genus includes 190 species.

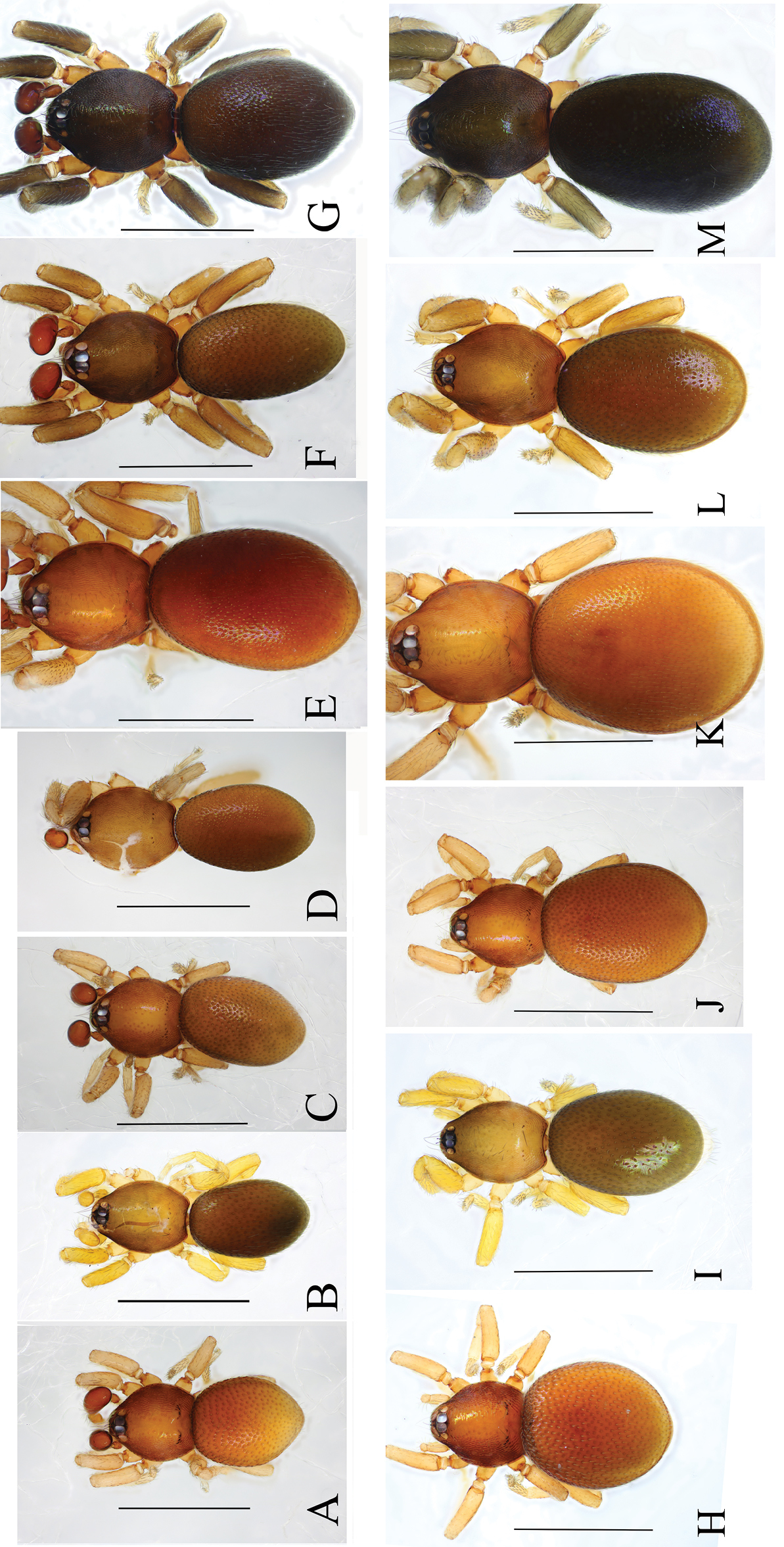
seven Opapaea sp. from Kenya

Complete list of species as of October 2025
- Opopaea aculeata Baehr & Harvey, 2013 – Western Australia
- Opopaea acuminata Baehr, 2013 – Australia (New South Wales)
- Opopaea addsae Baehr & Smith, 2013 – New South Wales
- Opopaea alje Saaristo & Marusik, 2008 – Tanzania
- Opopaea ameyi Baehr, 2013 – Australia (Queensland)
- Opopaea amieu Baehr, 2013 – New Caledonia
- Opopaea andranomay Andriamalala & Hormiga, 2013 – Madagascar
- Opopaea andringitra Andriamalala & Hormiga, 2013 – Madagascar
- Opopaea ankarafantsika Andriamalala & Hormiga, 2013 – Madagascar
- Opopaea ankarana Andriamalala & Hormiga, 2013 – Madagascar
- Opopaea antoniae Baehr, 2011 – Australia (Queensland, New South Wales)
- Opopaea antsalova Andriamalala & Hormiga, 2013 – Madagascar
- Opopaea antsiranana Andriamalala & Hormiga, 2013 – Madagascar
- Opopaea apicalis (Simon, 1893) – China, Thailand, Indonesia, Philippines. Introduced to United States, Mexico, Panama, Ecuador, Seychelles, Pacific Islands
- Opopaea aurantiaca Baehr & Harvey, 2013 – Australia (Western Australia)
- Opopaea auriforma Tong & Li, 2015 – China
- Opopaea banksi (Hickman, 1950) – Australia (South Australia)
- Opopaea batanguena Barrion & Litsinger, 1995 – Philippines
- Opopaea bemaraha Andriamalala & Hormiga, 2013 – Madagascar
- Opopaea bemarivo Andriamalala & Hormiga, 2013 – Madagascar
- Opopaea berenty Andriamalala & Hormiga, 2013 – Madagascar
- Opopaea berlandi (Simon & Fage, 1922) – Kenya
- Opopaea betioky Andriamalala & Hormiga, 2013 – Madagascar
- Opopaea bicolor Baehr, 2013 – New Caledonia
- Opopaea billroth Baehr & Harvey, 2013 – Australia (Western Australia)
- Opopaea botswana Saaristo & Marusik, 2008 – Botswana
- Opopaea brisbanensis Baehr, 2013 – Australia (Queensland)
- Opopaea broadwater Baehr, 2013 – Australia (Queensland)
- Opopaea burwelli Baehr, 2013 – New Caledonia
- Opopaea bushblitz Baehr, 2013 – Australia (New South Wales)
- Opopaea calcaris Baehr, 2013 – New Caledonia
- Opopaea callani Baehr & Harvey, 2013 – Australia (Western Australia)
- Opopaea calona Chickering, 1969 – United States
- Opopaea carnarvon Baehr, 2013 – Australia (Queensland)
- Opopaea carteri Baehr, 2013 – Australia (Queensland)
- Opopaea chrisconwayi Baehr & Smith, 2013 – Australia (Queensland)
- Opopaea chunglinchaoi Barrion, Barrion-Dupo & Heong, 2013 – China (Hainan)
- Opopaea concolor (Blackwall, 1859) – Tropical Africa. Introduced to Hawaii, North, Central and South America, St. Helena
- Opopaea conujaingensis (Xu, 1986) – China
- Opopaea cornuta Yin & Wang, 1984 – China, Japan (Ryukyu Islands), Taiwan, Laos, Iran?
- Opopaea cowra Baehr & Harvey, 2013 – Australia (Western Australia)
- Opopaea deserticola Simon, 1892 – Southeast Asia. Introduced to USA to Panama, Caribbean, Venezuela, Brazil, Galapagos, Ascension Island, Cape Verde, Canary Islands, Middle East, Japan (Ryukyu and Ogasawara Is.), Pacific Islands (type species)
- Opopaea diaoluoshan Tong & Li, 2010 – China (Hainan)
- Opopaea douglasi Baehr, 2013 – Australia (Queensland)
- Opopaea durranti Baehr & Harvey, 2013 – Australia (Western Australia)
- Opopaea ectognophus Harvey & Edward, 2007 – Australia (Western Australia)
- Opopaea ephemera Baehr, 2013 – Australia (Northern Territory)
- Opopaea exoculata Baehr & Harvey, 2013 – Australia (Western Australia)
- Opopaea fiji Baehr, 2013 – Fiji
- Opopaea fishriver Baehr, 2013 – Australia (Northern Territory)
- Opopaea flabellata Tong & Li, 2015 – China
- Opopaea flava Baehr & Harvey, 2013 – Australia (Western Australia)
- Opopaea foulpointe Andriamalala & Hormiga, 2013 – Madagascar
- Opopaea foveolata Roewer, 1963 – China (Hainan), Pacific Islands
- Opopaea fragilis Baehr & Harvey, 2013 – Western Australia
- Opopaea framenaui Baehr & Harvey, 2013 – Western Australia
- Opopaea furcula Tong & Li, 2010 – China (Hainan)
- Opopaea gabon Saaristo & Marusik, 2008 – Gabon
- Opopaea gaborone Saaristo & Marusik, 2008 – Botswana
- Opopaea gerstmeieri Baehr, 2013 – Australia (New South Wales)
- Opopaea gibbifera Tong & Li, 2008 – China (Hainan)
- Opopaea gilliesi Baehr, 2013 – Australia (Northern Territory)
- Opopaea goloboffi Baehr, 2013 – New Caledonia
- Opopaea gracilis Baehr & Harvey, 2013 – Western Australia
- Opopaea gracillima Baehr & Harvey, 2013 – Western Australia
- Opopaea harmsi Baehr & Harvey, 2013 – Western Australia
- Opopaea hawaii Baehr, 2013 – Hawaii
- Opopaea hoplites (Berland, 1914) – East Africa
- Opopaea ita Ott, 2003 – Brazil
- Opopaea itampolo Andriamalala & Hormiga, 2013 – Madagascar
- Opopaea johannae Baehr & Harvey, 2013 – Western Australia
- Opopaea johardingae Baehr, 2013 – Australia (Northern Territory)
- Opopaea jonesae Baehr, 2011 – Australia (Queensland)
- Opopaea julianneae Baehr & Ott, 2013 – Western Australia
- Opopaea kanpetlet Tong & Li, 2020 – Myanmar
- Opopaea kirindy Andriamalala & Hormiga, 2013 – Madagascar
- Opopaea kulczynskii (Berland, 1914) – Kenya
- Opopaea lambkinae Baehr, 2013 – Australia (Queensland)
- Opopaea lebretoni Baehr, 2013 – Australia (New South Wales)
- Opopaea leica Baehr, 2011 – Australia (Queensland)
- Opopaea leichhardti Baehr, 2013 – Australia (Queensland)
- Opopaea lemniscata Tong & Li, 2013 – Laos
- Opopaea linea Baehr, 2013 – Australia (Queensland, New South Wales)
- Opopaea lingua Saaristo, 2007 – Israel
- Opopaea macula Tong & Li, 2015 – China
- Opopaea magna Baehr, 2013 – Australia (New South Wales)
- Opopaea mahafaly Andriamalala & Hormiga, 2013 – Madagascar
- Opopaea makadara Tong & Li, 2019 – Kenya
- Opopaea manderano Andriamalala & Hormiga, 2013 – Madagascar
- Opopaea mangun Tong & Li, 2024 – China
- Opopaea manongarivo Andriamalala & Hormiga, 2013 – Madagascar
- Opopaea marangaroo Baehr & Harvey, 2013 – Western Australia
- Opopaea margaretehoffmannae Baehr & Smith, 2013 – Australia (New South Wales)
- Opopaea margaritae (Denis, 1947) – Tunisia, Egypt
- Opopaea maroantsetra Andriamalala & Hormiga, 2013 – Comoros, Madagascar
- Opopaea martini Baehr, 2013 – Australia (New South Wales)
- Opopaea mattica Simon, 1893 – Gabon, South Africa
- Opopaea mcleani Baehr, 2013 – Australia (Queensland)
- Opopaea media Song & Xu, 1984 – China
- Opopaea meditata Gertsch & Davis, 1936 – United States
- Opopaea michaeli Baehr & Smith, 2013 – Australia (New South Wales)
- Opopaea millbrook Baehr, 2013 – South Australia
- Opopaea milledgei Baehr, 2013 – Australia (New South Wales)
- Opopaea millstream Baehr & Harvey, 2013 – Western Australia
- Opopaea mollis (Simon, 1907) – Sri Lanka
- Opopaea monteithi Baehr, 2013 – New Caledonia
- Opopaea mundy Baehr, 2013 – South Australia
- Opopaea nadineae Baehr & Harvey, 2013 – Western Australia
- Opopaea namoroka Andriamalala & Hormiga, 2013 – Madagascar
- Opopaea ndoua Baehr, 2013 – New Caledonia
- Opopaea ngangao Tong & Li, 2019 – Kenya
- Opopaea ngulia Tong & Li, 2019 – Kenya
- Opopaea nibasa Saaristo & van Harten, 2006 – Yemen
- Opopaea nitens Baehr, 2013 – Australia (New South Wales)
- Opopaea olivernashi Baehr, 2011 – Australia (Queensland)
- Opopaea ottoi Baehr, 2013 – Australia (New South Wales)
- Opopaea palau Baehr, 2013 – Palau Is.
- Opopaea pallida Baehr & Harvey, 2013 – Western Australia
- Opopaea pannawonica Baehr & Ott, 2013 – Western Australia
- Opopaea phineus Harvey & Edward, 2007 – Western Australia
- Opopaea pilbara Baehr & Ott, 2013 – Western Australia
- Opopaea plana Baehr, 2013 – Australia (New South Wales)
- Opopaea platnicki Baehr, 2013 – New Caledonia
- Opopaea plumula Yin & Wang, 1984 – China
- Opopaea preecei Baehr, 2013 – Australia (Northern Territory)
- Opopaea probosciella Saaristo, 2001 – Seychelles
- Opopaea proserpine Baehr, 2013 – Australia (Queensland)
- Opopaea punctata (O. Pickard-Cambridge, 1872) – Algeria, Tunisia, Egypt, Greece, Cyprus, Turkey, Lebanon, Israel
- Opopaea raveni Baehr, 2013 – New Caledonia
- Opopaea rigidula Tong & Li, 2015 – China
- Opopaea rixi Baehr & Harvey, 2013 – Western Australia
- Opopaea robusta Baehr & Ott, 2013 – Western Australia
- Opopaea rogerkitchingi Baehr, 2011 – Australia (Queensland)
- Opopaea rugosa Baehr & Ott, 2013 – Western Australia
- Opopaea saaristoi Wunderlich, 2011 – Cyprus
- Opopaea sallami Saaristo & van Harten, 2006 – Yemen, Iran
- Opopaea sanaa Saaristo & van Harten, 2006 – Yemen
- Opopaea sandranantitra Andriamalala & Hormiga, 2013 – Madagascar
- Opopaea santschii Brignoli, 1974 – Tunisia, Greece (incl. Crete), Cyprus, Egypt, Israel
- Opopaea sanya Tong & Li, 2010 – China (Hainan)
- Opopaea sauteri Brignoli, 1974 – Taiwan
- Opopaea semilunata Tong & Li, 2015 – China
- Opopaea shanasi Saaristo, 2007 – Israel
- Opopaea sheldrick Tong & Li, 2019 – Kenya
- Opopaea silhouettei (Benoit, 1979) – Seychelles. Introduced to Austral Is. (Rapa)
- Opopaea simoni (Berland, 1914) – East Africa
- Opopaea simplex Baehr, 2013 – Australia (New South Wales)
- Opopaea sown Baehr, 2011 – Australia (Queensland, New South Wales)
- Opopaea speciosa (Lawrence, 1952) – Cabo Verde, South Africa, Yemen
- Opopaea speighti Baehr, 2011 – Australia (Queensland)
- Opopaea spinosa Saaristo & van Harten, 2006 – Yemen
- Opopaea spinosiscorona Ranasinghe & Benjamin, 2018 – Sri Lanka
- Opopaea sponsa Brignoli, 1978 – Bhutan
- Opopaea stanisici Baehr, 2013 – Australia (Queensland)
- Opopaea stevensi Baehr, 2013 – South Australia
- Opopaea striata Baehr, 2013 – New Caledonia
- Opopaea sturt Baehr, 2013 – Australia (New South Wales)
- Opopaea subtilis Baehr & Harvey, 2013 – Western Australia
- Opopaea sudan Saaristo & Marusik, 2008 – Sudan
- Opopaea suelewisae Baehr & Smith, 2013 – Australia (New South Wales)
- Opopaea suspecta Saaristo, 2002 – Seychelles
- Opopaea syarakui (Komatsu, 1967) – Korea, Japan, Taiwan
- Opopaea sylvestrella Baehr & Smith, 2013 – Australia (New South Wales)
- Opopaea taibao Tong & Yang, 2024 – China
- Opopaea tenuis Baehr, 2013 – Australia (New South Wales)
- Opopaea torotorofotsy Andriamalala & Hormiga, 2013 – Madagascar
- Opopaea touho Baehr, 2013 – New Caledonia
- Opopaea triangularis Baehr & Harvey, 2013 – Western Australia
- Opopaea tsimaloto Andriamalala & Hormiga, 2013 – Madagascar
- Opopaea tsimbazaza Andriamalala & Hormiga, 2013 – Madagascar
- Opopaea tsimembo Andriamalala & Hormiga, 2013 – Madagascar
- Opopaea tsingy Andriamalala & Hormiga, 2013 – Madagascar
- Opopaea tsinjoriaky Andriamalala & Hormiga, 2013 – Madagascar
- Opopaea tuberculata Baehr, 2013 – New Caledonia
- Opopaea tumida Tong & Li, 2013 – Laos
- Opopaea ulrichi Baehr, 2013 – Australia (Queensland)
- Opopaea ursulae Baehr, 2013 – Australia (New South Wales)
- Opopaea viamao Ott, 2003 – Brazil, Argentina
- Opopaea vitrispina Tong & Li, 2010 – China (Hainan)
- Opopaea vohibazaha Andriamalala & Hormiga, 2013 – Madagascar
- Opopaea wenshan Tong & Zhang, 2024 – China
- Opopaea wheelarra Baehr & Ott, 2013 – Western Australia
- Opopaea whim Baehr & Harvey, 2013 – Western Australia
- Opopaea wongalara Baehr, 2013 – Australia (Northern Territory)
- Opopaea wundanyi Tong & Li, 2019 – Kenya
- Opopaea yorki Baehr, 2013 – Australia (New South Wales)
- Opopaea yuhuang Tong & Li, 2024 – China
- Opopaea yukii Baehr, 2011 – Australia (Queensland)
- Opopaea zhengi Tong & Li, 2015 – China
- Opopaea zhigangi Tong & Li, 2020 – Myanmar
