= Tigilanol tiglate =

Chemical compound

Clinical data
- Trade names: Stelfonta
- Other names: EBC-46
- License data: US DailyMed: Tigilanol tiglate
- Routes of administration: Injection
- ATCvet code: QL01XX91 (WHO)

Legal status
- Legal status: AU: S4 (Prescription only); US: ℞-only; EU: Rx-only; In general: ℞ (Prescription only)

Identifiers
- IUPAC name: (1aR,1bR,1cS,2aR,3S,3aS,6aS,6bR,7R,8R,8aS)-3,3a,6b-Trihydroxy-2a-(hydroxymethyl)-1,1,5,7-tetramethyl-8a-{[(2S)-2-methylbutanoyl]oxy}-4-oxo-1a,1b,1c,2a,3,3a,4,6a,6b,7,8,8a-dodecahydro-1H-cyclopropa[5', 6']benzo[1',2':7,8]azuleno[5,6-b]oxiren-8-yl-(2E)-2-methyl-2-butenoate
- CAS Number: 943001-56-7
- PubChem CID: 23627739
- ChemSpider: 32079087
- UNII: R1ZJT87990
- KEGG: D11191

Chemical and physical data
- Formula: C_{30}H_{42}O_{10}
- Molar mass: 562.656 g·mol^{−1}
- 3D model (JSmol): Interactive image
- SMILES: CCC(C)C(=O)O[C@@]12[C@@H](C1(C)C)[C@@H]3[C@H]4[C@](O4)([C@H]([C@]5([C@H]([C@]3([C@@H]([C@H]2OC(=O)/C(=C/C)/C)C)O)C=C(C5=O)C)O)O)CO
- InChI: InChI=1S/C30H42O10/c1-9-13(3)23(33)38-21-16(6)28(36)17-11-15(5)20(32)29(17,37)25(35)27(12-31)22(39-27)18(28)19-26(7,8)30(19,21)40-24(34)14(4)10-2/h9,11,14,16-19,21-22,25,31,35-37H,10,12H2,1-8H3/b13-9+/t14?,16-,17+,18-,19-,21-,22+,25-,27+,28+,29-,30-/m1/s1; Key:YLQZMOUMDYVSQR-YUKITULJSA-N

Tigilanol tiglate (USAN; sold under the brand name Stelfonta) is a medication used to treat dogs with non-metastatic, skin-based (cutaneous) mast cell tumors (MCTs). The FDA is also approving Stelfonta to treat non-metastatic MCTs located under the dog's skin (subcutaneous), in particular areas of a dog's leg. Stelfonta is injected directly into the MCT (intratumoral injection). Stelfonta works by activating a protein that spreads throughout the treated tumor, which disintegrates tumor cells.

It is a tiglien-3-on derivative, with a tigliane backbone. Since the substance is obtained by extraction, impurities with other tiglian-3-one derivatives are possible.

Initially, the synthesis was only used to confirm the structure and is possible via the Wender synthesis. In 2022, the Wender group reported an efficient semi-synthesis of tigilanol tiglate from phorbol (12% overall yield over 12 steps).

Tigilanol tiglate was approved for use in dogs in the European Union in January 2020. It is indicated for the treatment of non-resectable, non-metastatic (WHO staging) subcutaneous mast cell tumors located at or distal to the elbow or the hock, and non-resectable, non metastatic cutaneous mast cell tumors in dogs.

== Research ==
Tigilanol tiglate is an experimental drug candidate being studied in phase I and II human trials by the Australian company Ecobiotics (specifically its drug discovery subsidiary Qbiotics) in partnership with MSD. It was discovered through an automated screening process of natural products by selecting increasingly purified fractions of plant extracts, based on their ability to produce the desired activity profile. This is then followed by artificial synthesis of the isolated compound to confirm its chemical structure. Tigilanol tiglate is a phorbol ester which, along with other related compounds, acts as a protein kinase C regulator.

The initial lead came from observation that marsupials found the seed of Fontainea picrosperma (blushwood) unpalatable due to an inflammatory chemical present in reasonably high concentrations. This was identified as 12-tigloyl-13-(2-methylbutanoyl)-6,7-epoxy-4,5,9,12,13,20-hexahydroxy-1-tiglian-3-one.

Tigilanol tiglate is an extract from blushwood berries of Queensland, Australia.
