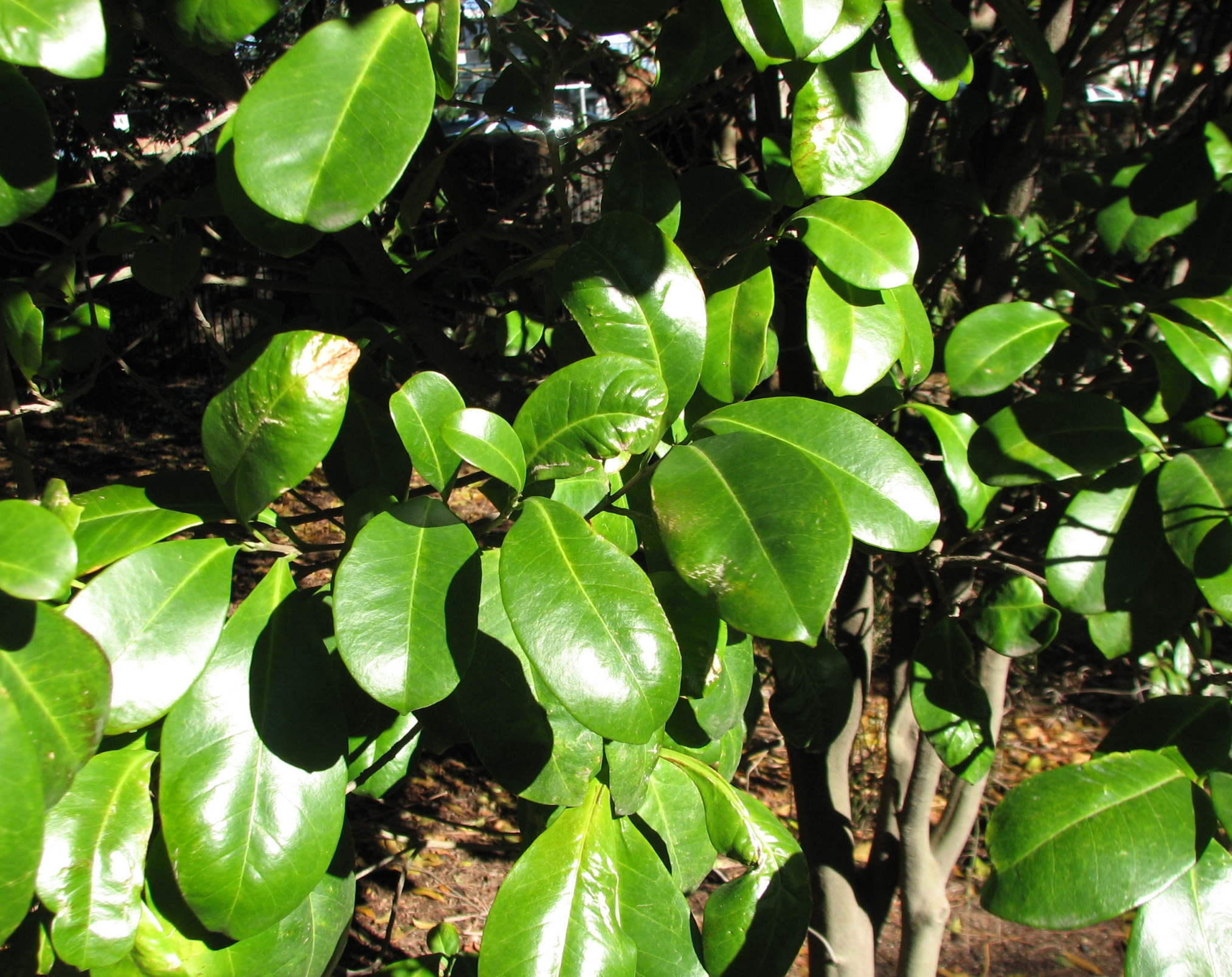

Conservation status
- Vulnerable (EPBC Act)

Scientific classification
- Kingdom: Plantae
- Clade: Tracheophytes
- Clade: Angiosperms
- Clade: Eudicots
- Clade: Rosids
- Order: Malpighiales
- Family: Euphorbiaceae
- Genus: Fontainea
- Species: F. rostrata

Binomial name
- Fontainea rostrata Jessup & Guymer

= Fontainea rostrata =

Species of tree

Fontainea rostrata, commonly known as Deep Creek fontainea, is a rainforest tree or shrub endemic to Queensland in Australia. It is listed as "vulnerable" under the Commonwealth Environment Protection and Biodiversity Conservation Act 1999.

The species was formally described in 1985 based on plant material collected to the north of Gympie, Queensland.

== Conservation Status ==
Fontainea rostrata is classified as "vulnerable" under the Australian Government Environment Protection and Biodiversity Conservation Act 1999 and as "vulnerable" under the Queensland Government Nature Conservation Act 1992.
