= Fontainea picrosperma =

Scientific classification
- Kingdom: Plantae
- Clade: Tracheophytes
- Clade: Angiosperms
- Clade: Eudicots
- Clade: Rosids
- Order: Malpighiales
- Family: Euphorbiaceae
- Genus: Fontainea
- Species: F. picrosperma

Binomial name
- Fontainea picrosperma C.T.White

Species of tree

Fontainea picrosperma, commonly known as the blushwood tree, is a rainforest tree in the family Euphorbiaceae endemic to Queensland in Australia, where it grows on the Atherton Tablelands.

== Uses ==
An anti-cancer drug known as EBC-46 has been developed from an extract of the fruits of Fontainea picrosperma. Trials have shown that it has activity against four different types of tumours, including basal-cell carcinoma, melanoma, squamous cell carcinoma and breast adenocarcinoma. The fruits are toxic to humans if eaten.
