= Bloodwood =

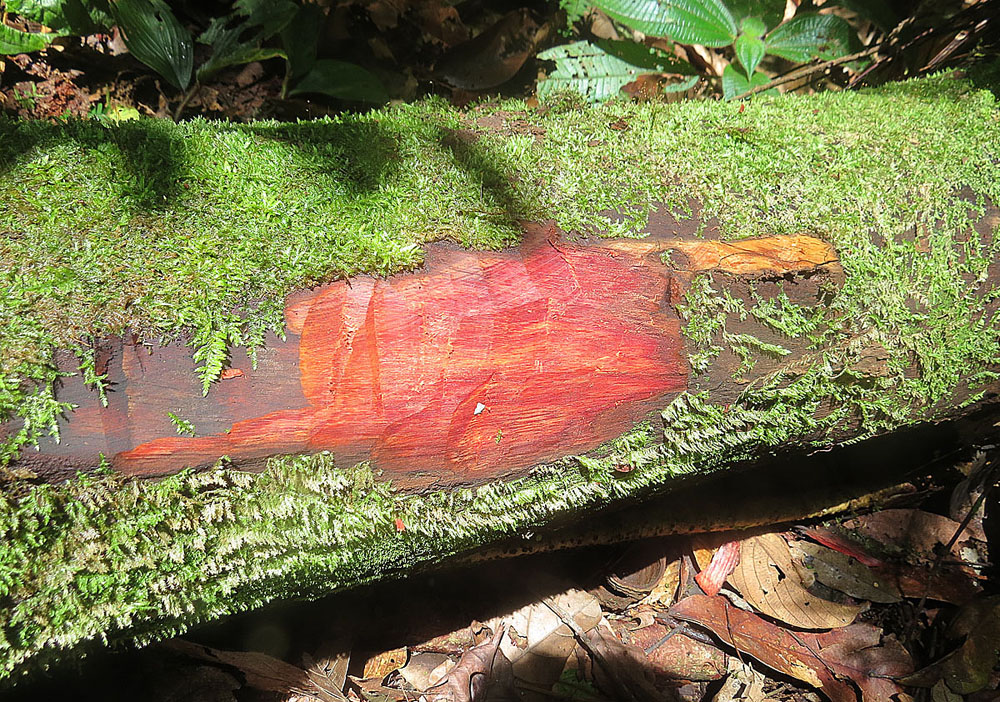
Bloodwood of Brosimum rubescens

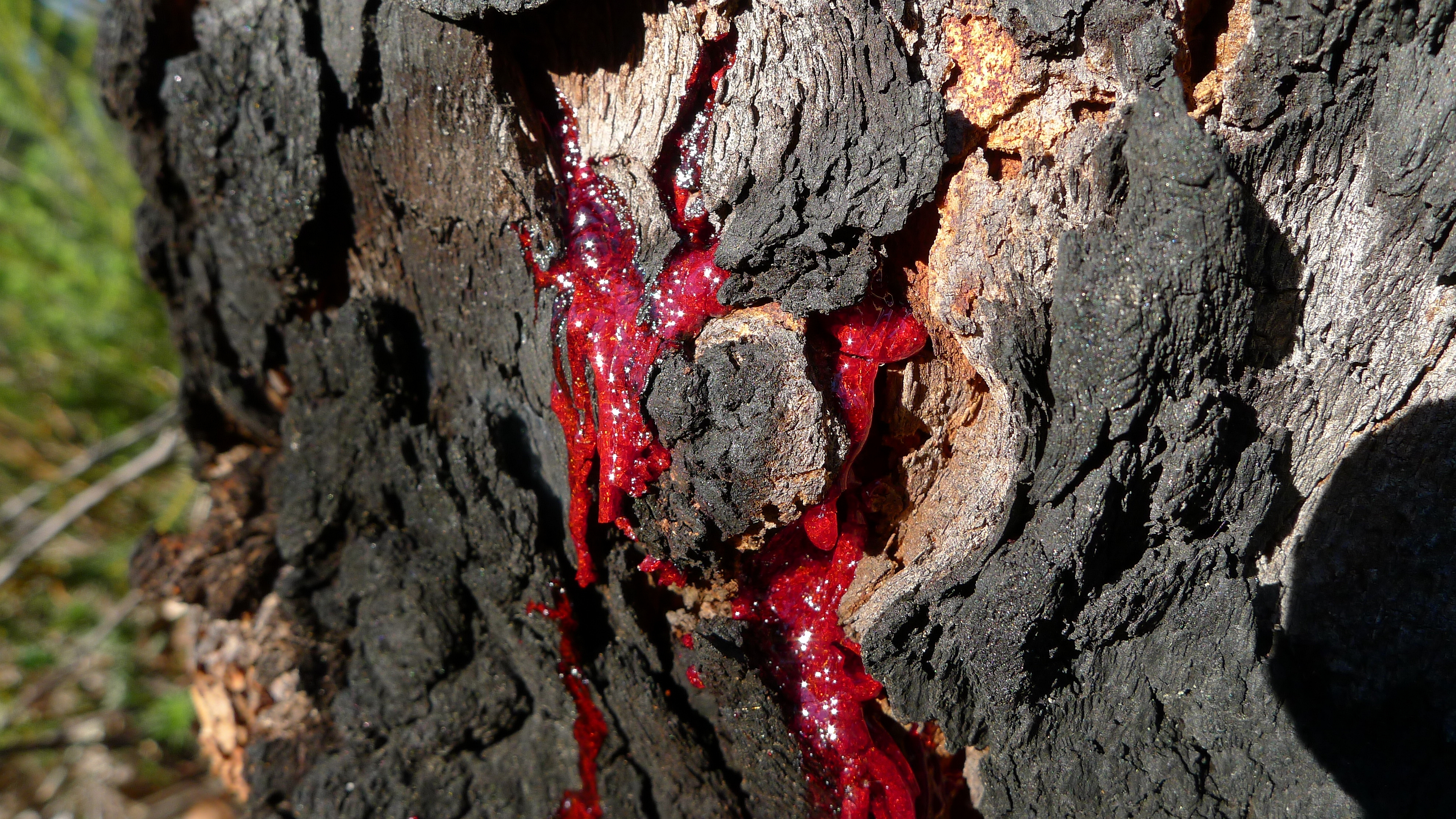
Trunk of Corymbia gummifera with red bleeding (Kino)

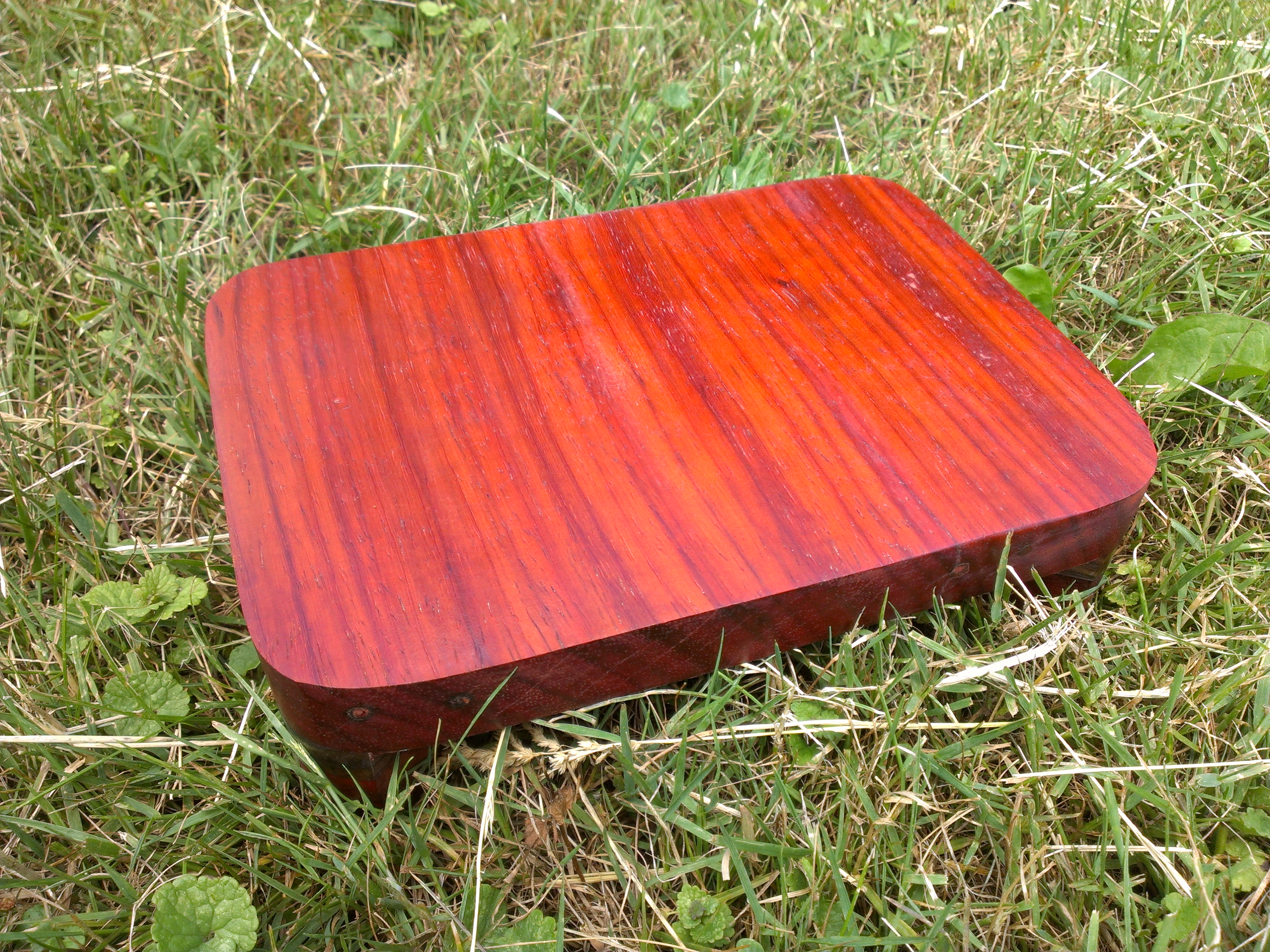
Pterocarpus soyauxii bonsai stand

Bloodwood is a common name for several unrelated trees, including:

- Baloghia inophylla (Brush or Scrub bloodwood), Baloghia marmorata (Marbled bloodwood), Baloghia parviflora (Small-flowered bloodwood), all found in Australia
- Brosimum rubescens, a tree found in Central and South America
- Many Myrtaceae trees in the genus Corymbia from Australia, formerly from the genus Eucalyptus; Corymbia gummifera (Red bloodwood), Corymbia intermedia (Pink bloodwood), Corymbia ptychocarpa (Swamp and Spring bloodwood), Corymbia opaca (Desert bloodwood), Corymbia eximia (Yellow bloodwood) etc.
- Casuarina equisetifolia, found in Southeast Asia, Northern Australia and the Pacific
- Cyrilla racemiflora found in the Neotropics
- Gordonia haematoxylon, a tree from Jamaica
- Haematoxylum campechianum, a tree from Central America and Caribbean
- Lagerstroemia speciosa (Indian bloodwood)
- Several trees from the genus Pterocarpus from Africa and Asia, the trees yields a red exsudate which soon harden into crimson tears (Kino, Dragon's blood); Pterocarpus angolensis, Pterocarpus erinaceus, Pterocarpus rotundifolius, Pterocarpus indicus, Pterocarpus officinalis (Dragon's blood), etc. The Pterocarpus wood is traded under different names but normally not as bloodwood.
- Vachellia haematoxylon (Syn.: Acacia haematoxylon) Bloodwood-Acacia, southern Africa

== See also ==
- Ironwood
- Rosewood
