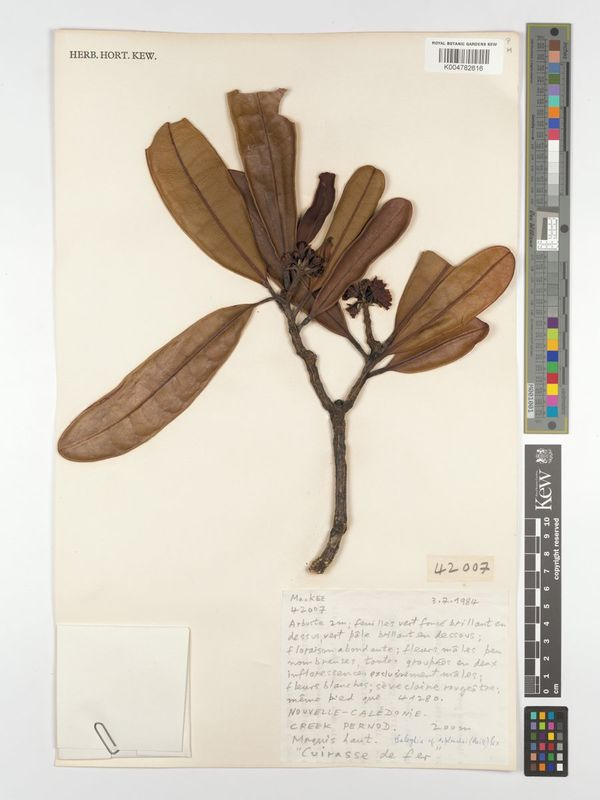

Conservation status
- Least Concern (IUCN 3.1)

Scientific classification
- Kingdom: Plantae
- Clade: Embryophytes
- Clade: Tracheophytes
- Clade: Spermatophytes
- Clade: Angiosperms
- Clade: Eudicots
- Clade: Rosids
- Order: Malpighiales
- Family: Euphorbiaceae
- Genus: Baloghia
- Species: B. deplanchei

Binomial name
- Baloghia deplanchei (Baill.) Pax

Synonyms
- Codiaeum deplanchei Baill.

= Baloghia deplanchei =

Species of flowering plant

Baloghia deplanchei is a species of flowering plant in the family Euphorbiaceae. It is a shrub endemic to New Caledonia. The species was described in 1873, and is listed as of Least Concern by the IUCN.

== Taxonomy ==
The species was described by Henri Ernest Baillon in 1873, and placed in the genus Codiaeum. In 1911, Ferdinand Albin Pax moved it to Baloghia.

== Distribution ==
Baloghia deplanchei is endemic to the wet tropical biome of south-east New Caledonia, with one observation in Kouaoua. Its estimated extent of occurrence is 2,077 square kilometres (802 sq mi). The species grows in shrublands and dense humid forests, on ultramafic substrates, at elevations of 10–500 metres (33–1,640 ft).

== Description ==
Baloghia deplanchei is a shrub.

== Conservation ==
In 2018, the IUCN assessed Baloghia deplanchei as of Least Concern. Some populations may be impacted by mining and fire. The species is not legally protected, but occurs in protected areas.
