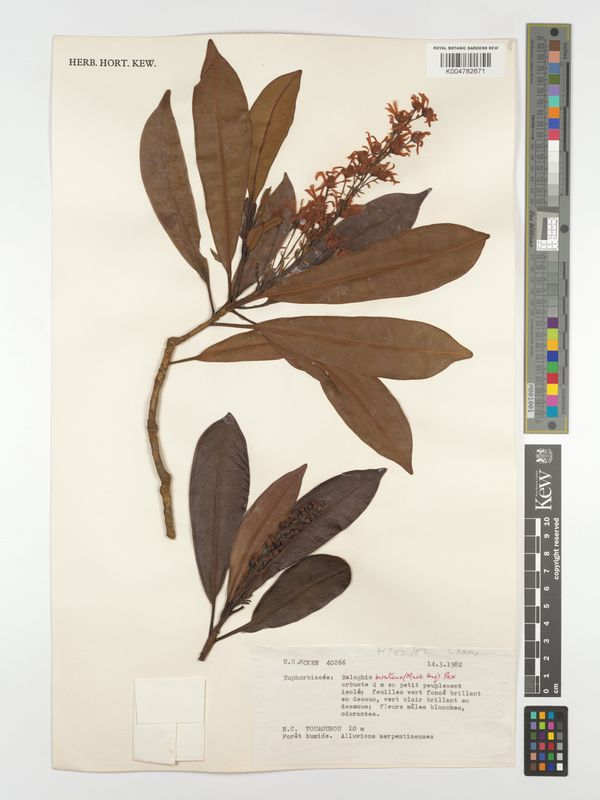

Conservation status
- Vulnerable (IUCN 3.1)

Scientific classification
- Kingdom: Plantae
- Clade: Embryophytes
- Clade: Tracheophytes
- Clade: Spermatophytes
- Clade: Angiosperms
- Clade: Eudicots
- Clade: Rosids
- Order: Malpighiales
- Family: Euphorbiaceae
- Genus: Baloghia
- Species: B. montana

Binomial name
- Baloghia montana (Müll.Arg.) Pax

Synonyms
- Codiaeum montanum (Müll.Arg.) Baill.; Steigeria montana Müll.Arg.; Baloghia montana var. neohebridensis Airy Shaw

= Baloghia montana =

Species of flowering plant

Baloghia montana is a species of flowering plant in the family Euphorbiaceae. It is a shrub or tree endemic to New Caledonia. The species was described in 1865, and is listed as Vulnerable by the IUCN.

== Taxonomy ==
The species was described by Johannes Müller Argoviensis in 1865, and initially placed in the genus Steigeria. In 1873, Henri Ernest Baillon moved the species to the genus Codiaeum. In 1911, Johannes Müller Argoviensis moved it to the genus Baloghia.

== Distribution ==
Baloghia montana is endemic to the wet tropical biome of New Caledonia. Its extent of occurrence is around 5,481 square kilometres (2,116 sq mi). The species grows in dense, humid forests, on volcanic sediments, at elevations of 200–800 metres (660–2,620 ft).

== Description ==
Baloghia montana is a shrub or tree.

== Conservation ==
In 2018, the IUCN assessed Baloghia montana as Vulnerable. It is threatened by invasive species (including feral pigs and the Javan rusa), mining, and fires. The species is not legally protected, but occurs in Parc des Grandes Fougères, a protected area.
