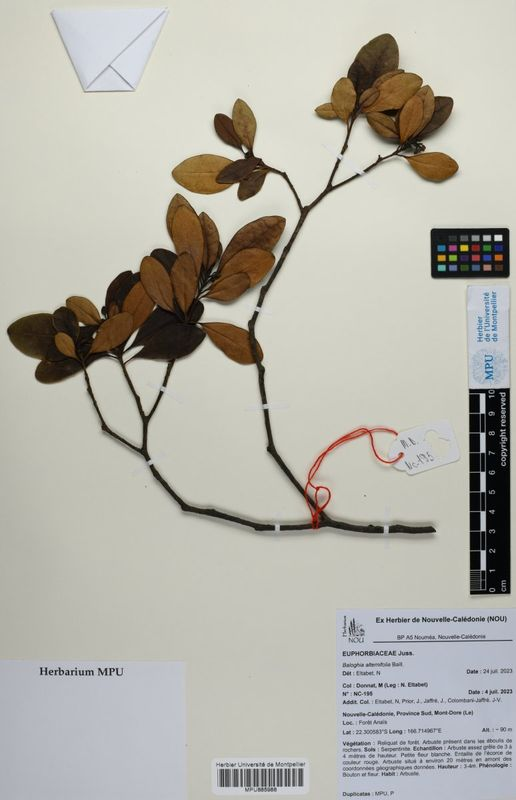

Conservation status
- Least Concern (IUCN 3.1)

Scientific classification
- Kingdom: Plantae
- Clade: Embryophytes
- Clade: Tracheophytes
- Clade: Spermatophytes
- Clade: Angiosperms
- Clade: Eudicots
- Clade: Rosids
- Order: Malpighiales
- Family: Euphorbiaceae
- Genus: Baloghia
- Species: B. alternifolia

Binomial name
- Baloghia alternifolia Baill.

Synonyms
- Codiaeum alternifolium (Baill.) Müll.Arg.

= Baloghia alternifolia =

Species of flowering plant

Baloghia alternifolia is a species of flowering plant in the family Euphorbiaceae. It is a shrub or tree endemic to New Caledonia. The IUCN lists the species as of Least Concern.

== Taxonomy ==
The species was described by Henri Ernest Baillon in 1862. Johannes Müller Argoviensis placed it in the genus Codiaeum.

== Distribution ==
Baloghia alternifolia is endemic to the wet tropical biome of New Caledonia. It is common in Grande Terre, and present on the islands of Ouen and Belep. The species' extent of occurrence is around 17,741 square kilometres (6,850 sq mi).

Baloghia alternifolia grows in forest edges and in shrublands, on ultramafic surfaces, at elevations of up to 600 metres (2,000 ft).

== Description ==
Baloghia alternifolia is a shrub or tree with yellowish-white flowers.

== Conservation ==
In 2018, the IUCN assessed Baloghia alternifolia as of Least Concern. It may be affected by mining in Tiebaghi, and by fires. The species is not legally protected, but is found in protected areas.
