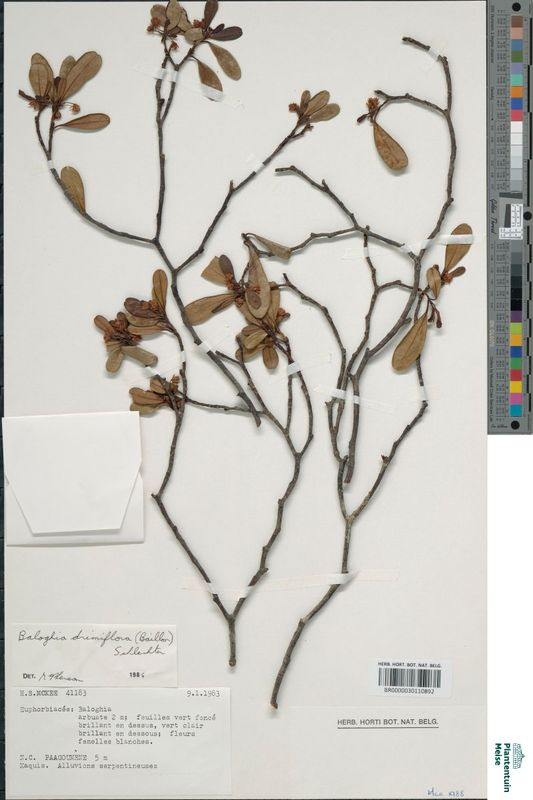

Conservation status
- Near Threatened (IUCN 3.1)

Scientific classification
- Kingdom: Plantae
- Clade: Embryophytes
- Clade: Tracheophytes
- Clade: Spermatophytes
- Clade: Angiosperms
- Clade: Eudicots
- Clade: Rosids
- Order: Malpighiales
- Family: Euphorbiaceae
- Genus: Baloghia
- Species: B. drimiflora

Binomial name
- Baloghia drimiflora (Baill.) Schltr.

Synonyms
- Codiaeum drimiflorum Baill.

= Baloghia drimiflora =

Species of flowering plant

Baloghia drimiflora is a species of flowering plant in the family Euphorbiaceae. It is a shrub or tree endemic to New Caledonia. The species was described in 1873, and is listed as Near Threatened by the IUCN.

== Taxonomy ==
The species was first described by Henri Ernest Baillon in 1873, and placed in the genus Codiaeum. In 1906, Rudolf Schlechter moved it to the genus Baloghia.

== Distribution ==
Baloghia drimiflora is native to the wet tropical biome of north-west New Caledonia. It is endemic to New Caledonia. The species is present from Avangui to Poum, and is also found on Yandé Island. Its extent of occurrence is around 3,859 square kilometres (1,490 sq mi).

The species grows in shrublands, on ultramafic substrates, at elevations of 5–500 metres (16–1,640 ft).

== Description ==
Baloghia drimiflora is a shrub or tree.

== Conservation ==
In 2018, the IUCN assessed Baloghia drimiflora as Near Threatened. The species is abundant, but may be threatened by fires and mining. It is not legally protected, and is not present in protected areas.
