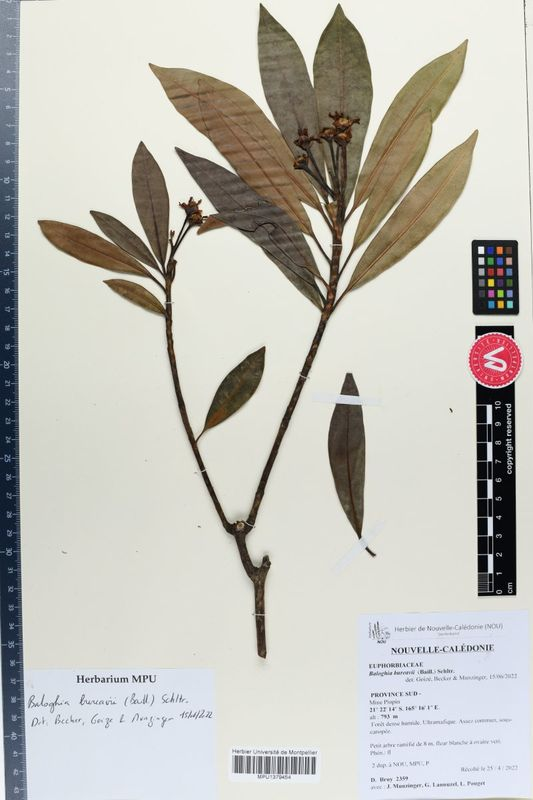

Conservation status
- Least Concern (IUCN 3.1)

Scientific classification
- Kingdom: Plantae
- Clade: Embryophytes
- Clade: Tracheophytes
- Clade: Spermatophytes
- Clade: Angiosperms
- Clade: Eudicots
- Clade: Rosids
- Order: Malpighiales
- Family: Euphorbiaceae
- Genus: Baloghia
- Species: B. bureavii

Binomial name
- Baloghia bureavii Schltr.

Synonyms
- Codiaeum bureavii Baill.

= Baloghia bureavii =

Species of flowering plant

Baloghia bureavii is a species of flowering plant in the family Euphorbiaceae. It is a shrub or tree endemic to New Caledonia. The species was described in 1873, and is listed as of Least Concern by the IUCN.

== Taxonomy ==
The species was described by Henri Ernest Baillon in 1873, and initially placed in the genus Codiaeum. Rudolf Schlechter moved the species to Baloghia in 1906.

== Distribution ==
Baloghia bureavii is native to the wet tropical biome of central and south-east New Caledonia. It is endemic to New Caledonia, and has a large distribution across Grande Terre. The species' extent of occurrence is around 6,633 square kilometres (2,561 sq mi).

The species grows in dense, humid forests, on ultramafic substrate, at elevations of 10–1,300 metres (33–4,265 ft).

== Description ==
Baloghia bureavii is a shrub or tree.

== Conservation ==
In 2018, the IUCN assessed Baloghia bureavii as of Least Concern. Some subpopulations may be affected by mining, fire, feral pigs, and the Javan Rusa.

Baloghia bureavii is not legally protected, but occurs in protected areas, including Blue River Provincial Park.
