= Baloghia pininsularis =

Conservation status
- Critically Endangered (IUCN 3.1)

Scientific classification
- Kingdom: Plantae
- Clade: Embryophytes
- Clade: Tracheophytes
- Clade: Spermatophytes
- Clade: Angiosperms
- Clade: Eudicots
- Clade: Rosids
- Order: Malpighiales
- Family: Euphorbiaceae
- Genus: Baloghia
- Species: B. pininsularis

Binomial name
- Baloghia pininsularis Guillaumin

Species of flowering plant

Baloghia pininsularis is a species of plant in the family Euphorbiaceae. It is endemic to New Caledonia.
