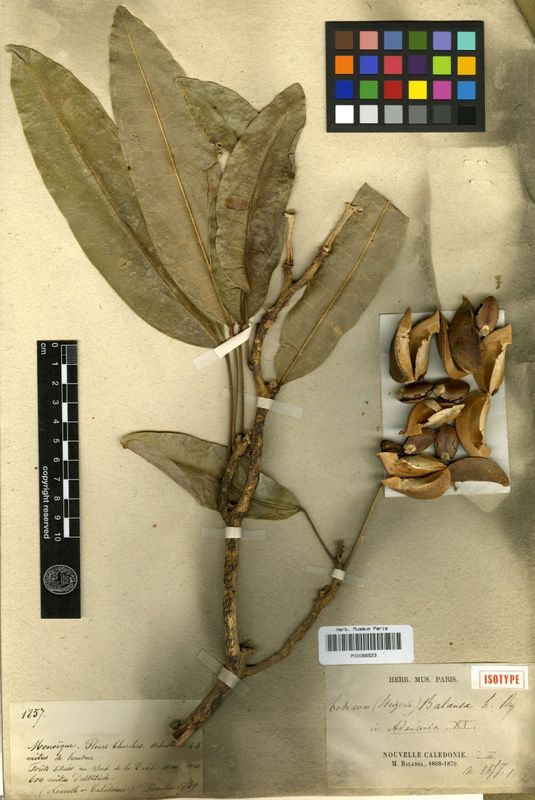

Conservation status
- Vulnerable (IUCN 3.1)

Scientific classification
- Kingdom: Plantae
- Clade: Embryophytes
- Clade: Tracheophytes
- Clade: Spermatophytes
- Clade: Angiosperms
- Clade: Eudicots
- Clade: Rosids
- Order: Malpighiales
- Family: Euphorbiaceae
- Genus: Baloghia
- Species: B. balansae

Binomial name
- Baloghia balansae Pax

Synonyms
- Codiaeum balansae Baill.

= Baloghia balansae =

Species of flowering plant

Baloghia balansae is a species of flowering plant in the family Euphorbiaceae. It is a shrub or tree endemic to New Caledonia. The species was described in 1911, and has been assessed as Vulnerable by the IUCN.

== Taxonomy ==
The species was described by Ferdinand Albin Pax in 1911.

== Distribution ==
Baloghia balansae is native to the wet tropical biome of central Grande Terre, New Caledonia. It is endemic to New Caledonia. The species' estimated extent of occurrence is 1,320 square kilometres (510 sq mi). It grows in dense humid forests, on volcanic sediments and ultramafic substrates, at elevations of 300–500 metres (980–1,640 ft).

== Description ==
Baloghia balansae is a shrub or tree.

== Conservation ==
In 2018, the IUCN assessed Baloghia balansae as Vulnerable. The species is threatened by fires, feral pigs, and the Rusa deer.

Baloghia balansae is not legally protected, but does occur in the protected area of Nodéla.
