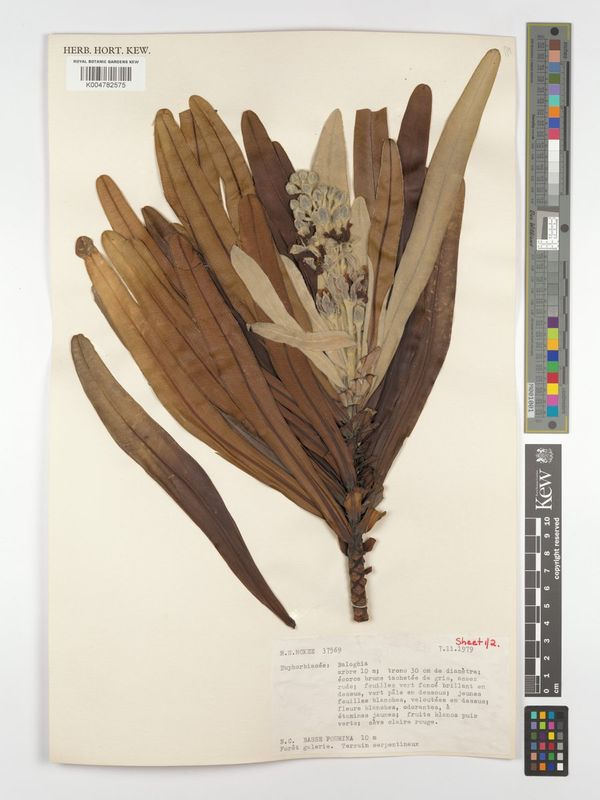

Conservation status
- Endangered (IUCN 3.1)

Scientific classification
- Kingdom: Plantae
- Clade: Embryophytes
- Clade: Tracheophytes
- Clade: Spermatophytes
- Clade: Angiosperms
- Clade: Eudicots
- Clade: Rosids
- Order: Malpighiales
- Family: Euphorbiaceae
- Genus: Baloghia
- Species: B. anisomera

Binomial name
- Baloghia anisomera Guillaumin

= Baloghia anisomera =

Species of flowering plant

Baloghia anisomera is a species of flowering plant in the family Euphorbiaceae. It is a tree endemic to New Caledonia. The species was described in 1922, and is listed as Endangered by the IUCN.

== Taxonomy ==
The species was described by André Guillaumin in 1922.

== Distribution ==
Baloghia anisomera is native to the wet tropical biome of central and south-east New Caledonia. It is endemic to New Caledonia, and has an estimated extent of occurrence of 732 square kilometres (283 sq mi). The species is known from three locations.

It grows in low forests and shrublands, on ultramafic substrates, at elevations up to 550 metres (1,800 ft).

== Description ==
Baloghia anisomera is a tree.

== Conservation ==
In 2018, the IUCN assessed Baloghia anisomera as Endangered. It is threatened by mining and fires. The species is legally protected in Province Nord, but is not known to be present in protected areas.
