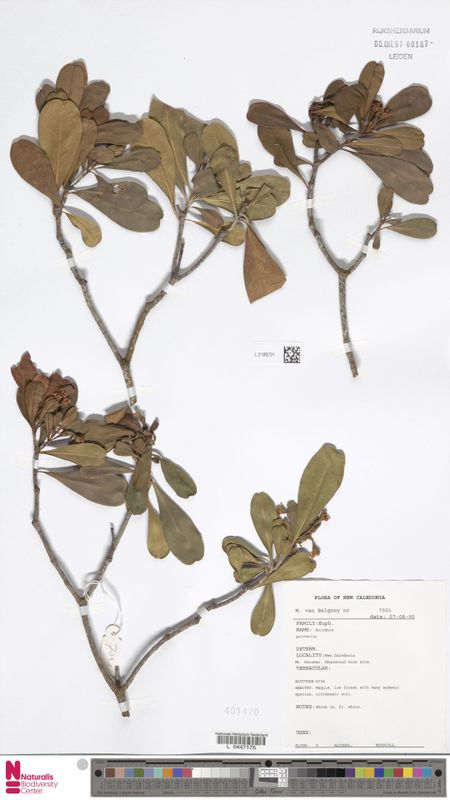

Conservation status
- Critically Endangered (IUCN 3.1)

Scientific classification
- Kingdom: Plantae
- Clade: Embryophytes
- Clade: Tracheophytes
- Clade: Spermatophytes
- Clade: Angiosperms
- Clade: Eudicots
- Clade: Rosids
- Order: Malpighiales
- Family: Euphorbiaceae
- Genus: Baloghia
- Species: B. pulchella

Binomial name
- Baloghia pulchella Schltr. ex Pax

= Baloghia pulchella =

Species of flowering plant

Baloghia pulchella is a species of flowering plant in the family Euphorbiaceae. It is a shrub or tree endemic to New Caledonia. The species was described in 1911, and is listed as Critically Endangered by the IUCN.

== Taxonomy ==
Ferdinand Albin Pax published the name Baloghia pulchella in 1911, following an earlier invalid publication by Rudolf Schlechter.

== Distribution ==
Baloghia pulchella is native to the wet tropical biome of New Caledonia. It is endemic to New aledonia, and known only from Mount Dzumac, in southern Grande Terre. The species' extent of occurrence is around 16 square kilometres (6.2 sq mi).

The species grows in shrublands, on ultramafic substrates, at elevations of 400–900 metres (1,300–3,000 ft).

== Description ==
Baloghia pulchella is a shrub or tree.

== Conservation ==
In 2018, the IUCN assessed Baloghia pulchella as Critically Endangered. The species is known from a single location, and has not been observed since 1983. It is threatened by fires, human intrusion, and feral pigs.

Baloghia pulchella is not legally protected, but has been found in Réserve Naturelle de la Haute-Dumbéa, a protected area.
