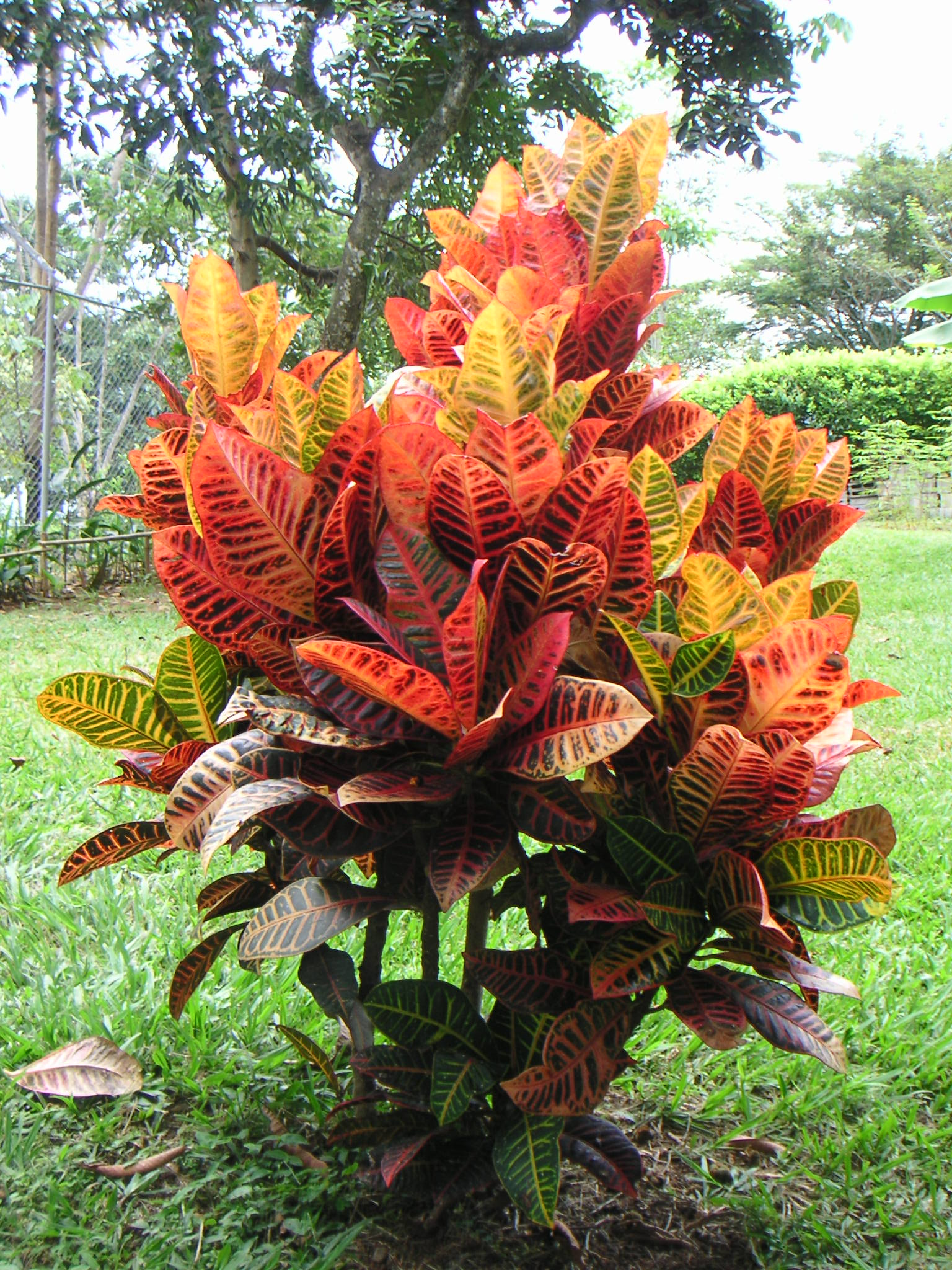
- Cultivated form
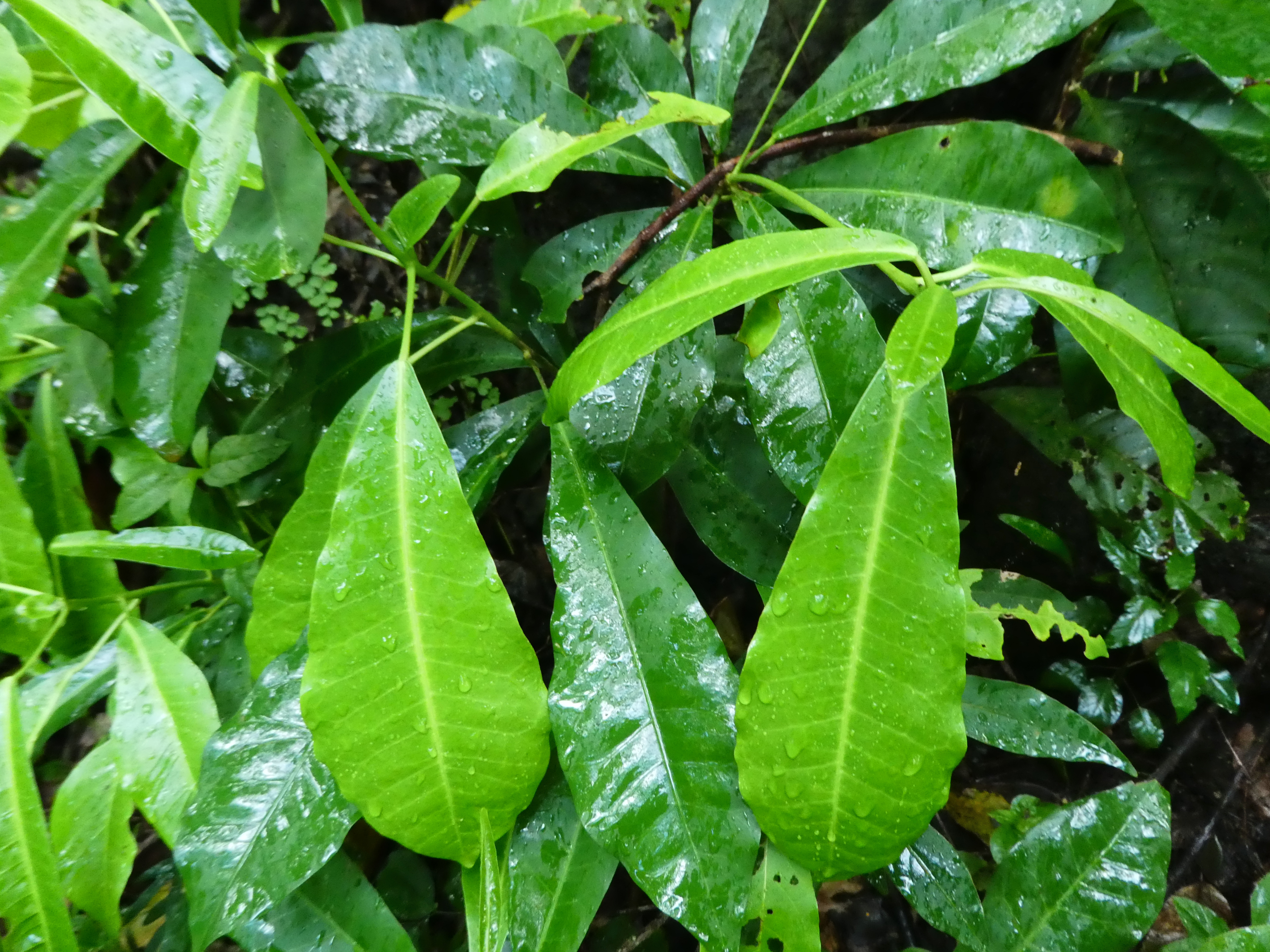
- Natural form in rainforest of Queensland

Conservation status
- Least Concern (IUCN 3.1)

Scientific classification
- Kingdom: Plantae
- Clade: Tracheophytes
- Clade: Angiosperms
- Clade: Eudicots
- Clade: Rosids
- Order: Malpighiales
- Family: Euphorbiaceae
- Genus: Codiaeum
- Species: C. variegatum

Binomial name
- Codiaeum variegatum (L.) Rumph. ex A.Juss.

Synonyms
- Codiaeum chrysosticton Rumph. ex Spreng.; Codiaeum variegatum var. genuinum Müll.Arg.; Croton variegatus L.; Crozophyla variegata (L.) Raf.; Oxydectes variegata (L.) Kuntze; Phyllaurea variegata (L.) W.Wight

= Codiaeum variegatum =

Species of flowering plant

Codiaeum variegatum, commonly known as croton or variegated croton amongst many other names, is a species of plant in the Euphorbiaceae family. Initially described by Carl Linnaeus in 1753, its native range is from Java east to Fiji, and from the Philippines south to Queensland, Australia. It is widely cultivated and has been introduced to many other countries.

== Description ==
Codiaeum variegatum is an evergreen and monoecious tropical shrub growing to 3 m (9.8 ft) tall, with thick, somewhat "leathery" and shiny, alternately arranged leaves. The foliage may measure from 5.0–30 cm (2.0–11.8 in) long by 0.5–8.0 cm (0.20–3.15 in) broad. The shape of mature leaves may appear diamond- or teardrop-shaped, even violin-like or ruler-lanceolate, lanceolate, oblong, elliptical, ovate-inverted, ovate-spatulate. The species is known for its vivid coloration (especially in higher sunlight), displaying almost "tie-dye"-like patterns of green, yellow, and purple, in varying hues and intensity, depending on variety. The petiole has a length of 0.2 to 2.5 cm. Similarly to other euphorbs, the inflorescences are long racemes, 8–30 cm (3.1–11.8 in) long, with male and female flowers separated. Male flowers are white, with five small petals and 20–30 stamens. The pollens are oval in shape and about 52x32 microns in size. The female flowers are yellowish and lacking petals. The blooming period is usually in early autumn, depending on location. The inedible and toxic fruit (for most mammals) is a capsule measuring roughly 9 mm (0.35 in) in diameter, containing three seeds of 6 mm (0.24 in) diameter.

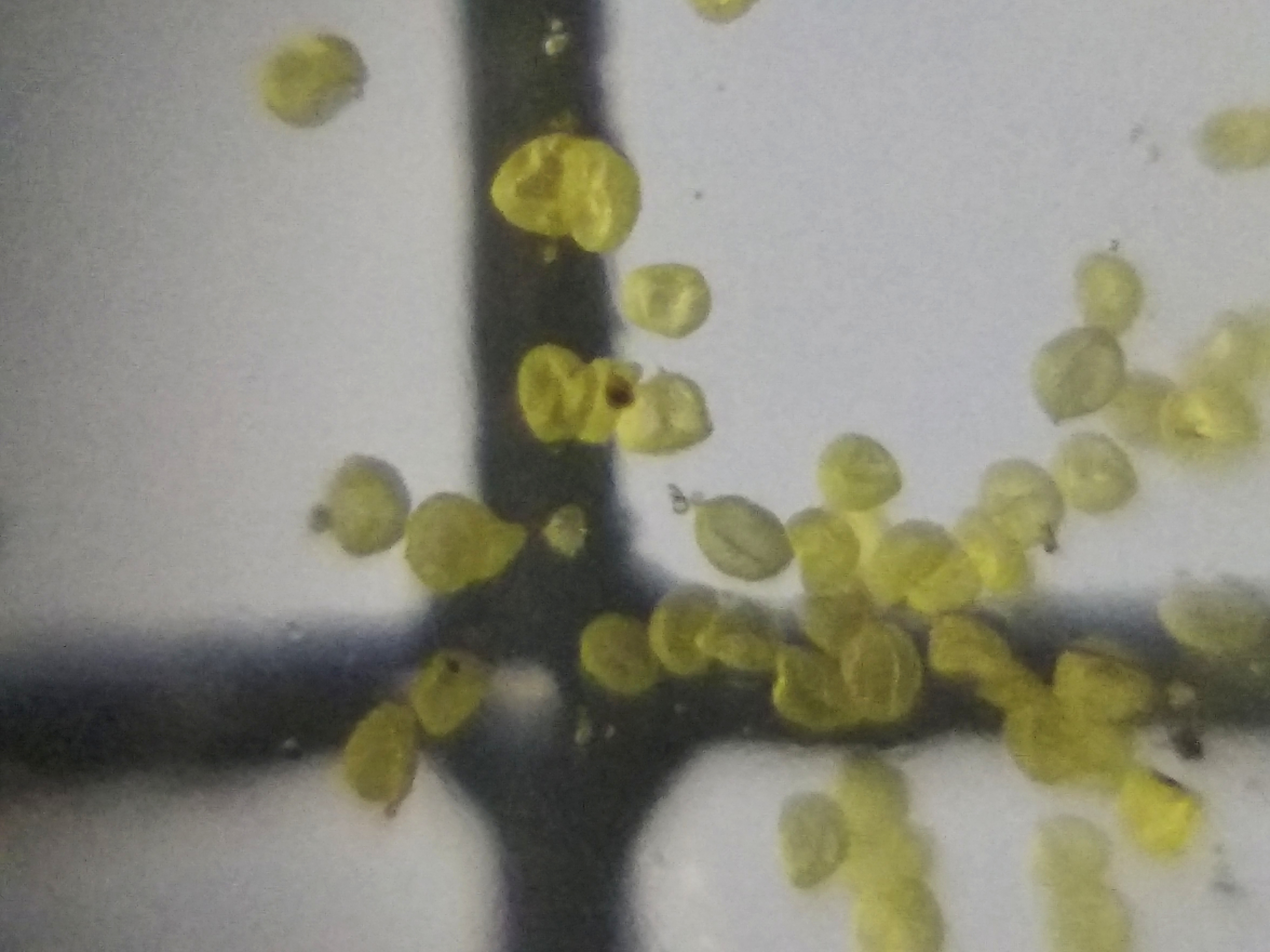
Pollen

== Taxonomy ==
This plant was first described in 1753 as Croton variegatus by Carl Linnaeus, and the currently accepted name, Codiaeum variegatum, was published by French botanist Adrien-Henri de Jussieu in 1824. Because this is a highly variable species, it has been described numerous times since Linnaeus' original publication, with various authors giving it various names. As of October 2025, Plants of the World Online accepts two varieties, namely C. v. var. cavernicola, native to Borneo, and C. v. var. variegata, of which there are 250 synonyms. In addition to that, more than 300 cultivars have been developed by growers around the world.

== Distribution ==
The natural range of the variegated croton is Malesia (Borneo, Java, the Lesser Sunda Islands, Maluku, the Philippines, Sulawesi), Papuasia (Bismarck Archipelago, New Guinea, the Solomon Islands), Queensland, and the Pacific islands of Fiji, the Santa Cruz Islands and Vanuatu. It is now found much further afield due to it being widely cultivated.

== Cultivation ==
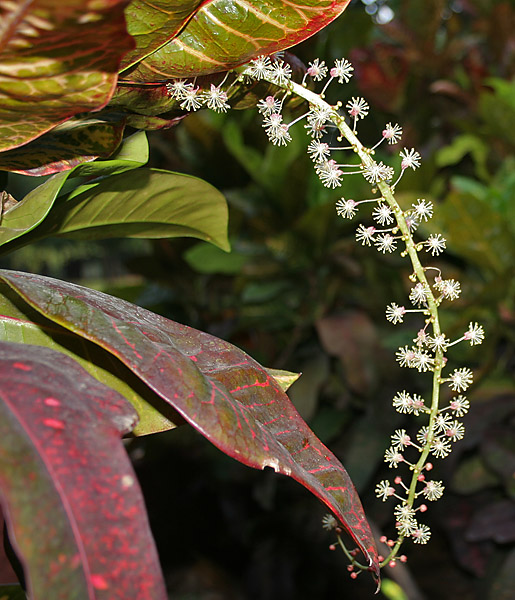
Male inflorescence on a plant in Hyderabad, India

In tropical climates, crotons make attractive hedges and potted patio specimens, valued for their striking foliage. They only survive outdoors where temperatures do not normally drop below 10 to 13 °C (50 to 55 °F) in winter; colder temperatures can cause leaf loss. In colder climates, the plants are grown in greenhouses or as house plants. The cultivated garden crotons are usually smaller than the wild plant, rarely over 1.8 m (5.9 ft) tall, and occur in a wide diversity of leaf shapes and colours. They are sometimes grouped under the name Codiaeum variegatum var. pictum (Lodd.) Müll. Arg., though this is not botanically distinct from the species and usually treated as a synonym of it.

=== Cultivars ===
The several hundred cultivars are selected and bred for their foliage. Depending on the cultivar, the leaves may be ovate to linear, entire to deeply lobed or crinkled, and variegated with green, white, purple, orange, yellow, red, or pink. The colour patterns may follow the veins or the margins, or be in blotches on the leaf. Popular cultivars include 'Spirale', which has spirally twisted red and green leaves; 'Andreanum', which has broadly oval yellow leaves with gold veins and margins; 'Majesticum', which has pendulous branches, with linear leaves up to 25 cm (9.8 in) long with midrib veins yellow maturing to red; and 'Aureo-maculatum', which has leaves spotted with yellow.

== Toxicity ==
As with the majority of the spurges, when broken or cut, every part of C. variegatum will "bleed" and drip a milky, caustic sap, eventually drying into a latex-like consistency. Care must be taken to avoid touching this latex, such as only handling the plant while wearing sufficiently protective gloves, as well as eye goggles or sunglasses. Generally, small, inadvertent drops of the sap on one's hands or skin will cause no ill effect in the majority of the population, provided it is promptly washed off using soapy, warm water—this may even be followed with the use of a hand sanitizer or even a mildly diluted isopropyl alcohol. However, direct contact between the sap of Euphorbiaceae and the eyes, ears, nose, mouth, genitals, or any open wound, is strongly discouraged and may result in unknown side effects. Complications stemming from sap contact may range from mild to extreme burning pain, itchiness, rash or temporary dulling of the senses; depending on the region of the body affected, this sensory reaction may include temporary or long-term complications with sight, hearing, taste, feeling or smell, among other issues. In certain sensitive-skinned individuals, contact with small amounts of the sap can cause contact dermatitis. The entire plant, including its bark, roots, inflorescences and foliage, is poisonous. The primary alkaloid present is the chemical compound 5-desoxyingenol. The plant contains an oil which is violently purgative and a suspected carcinogen. Consumption of the seeds can be fatal to children and even adults.

== Gallery ==
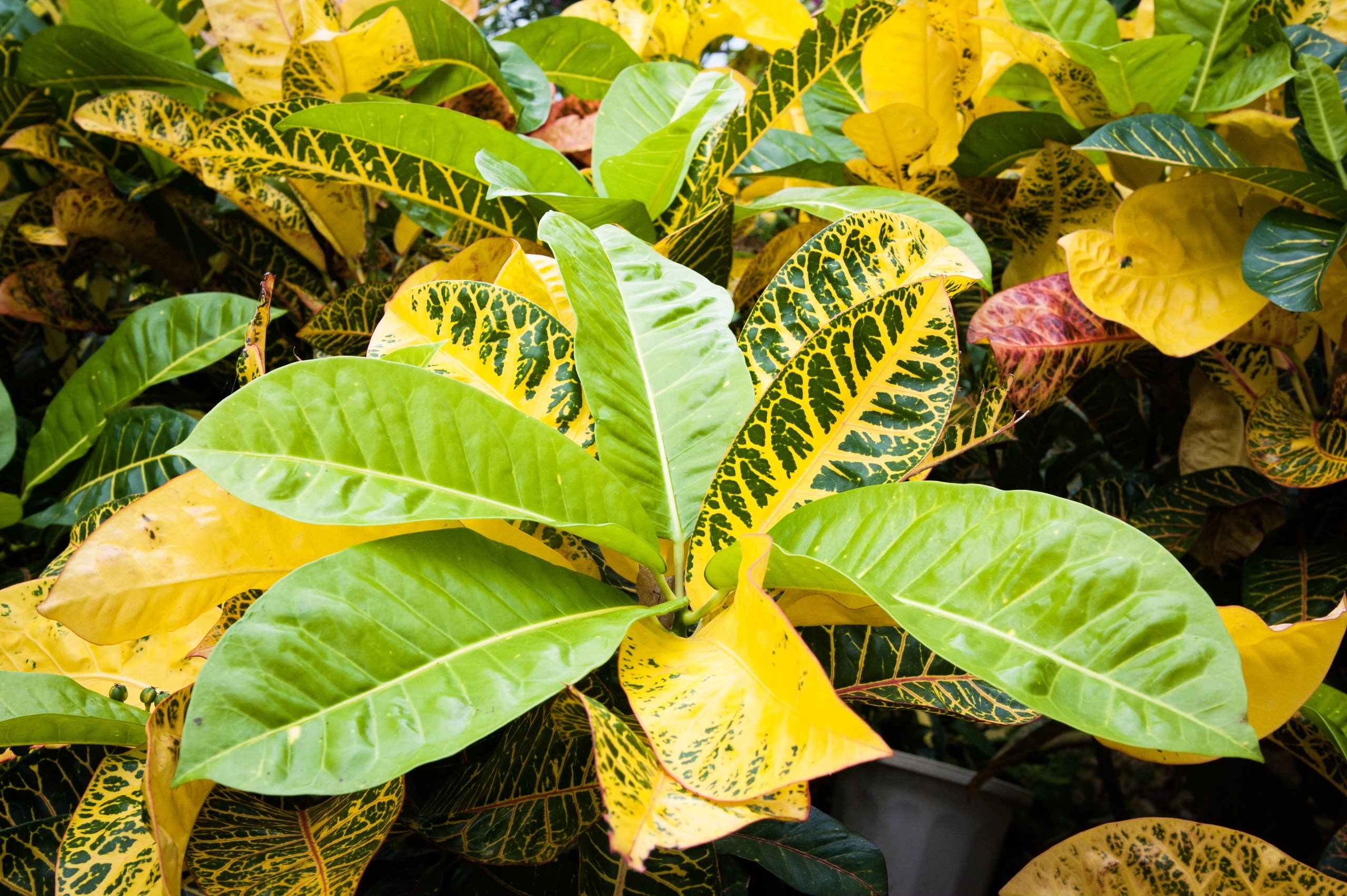
C. variegatum in Miyako-jima, Okinawa Prefecture, Japan

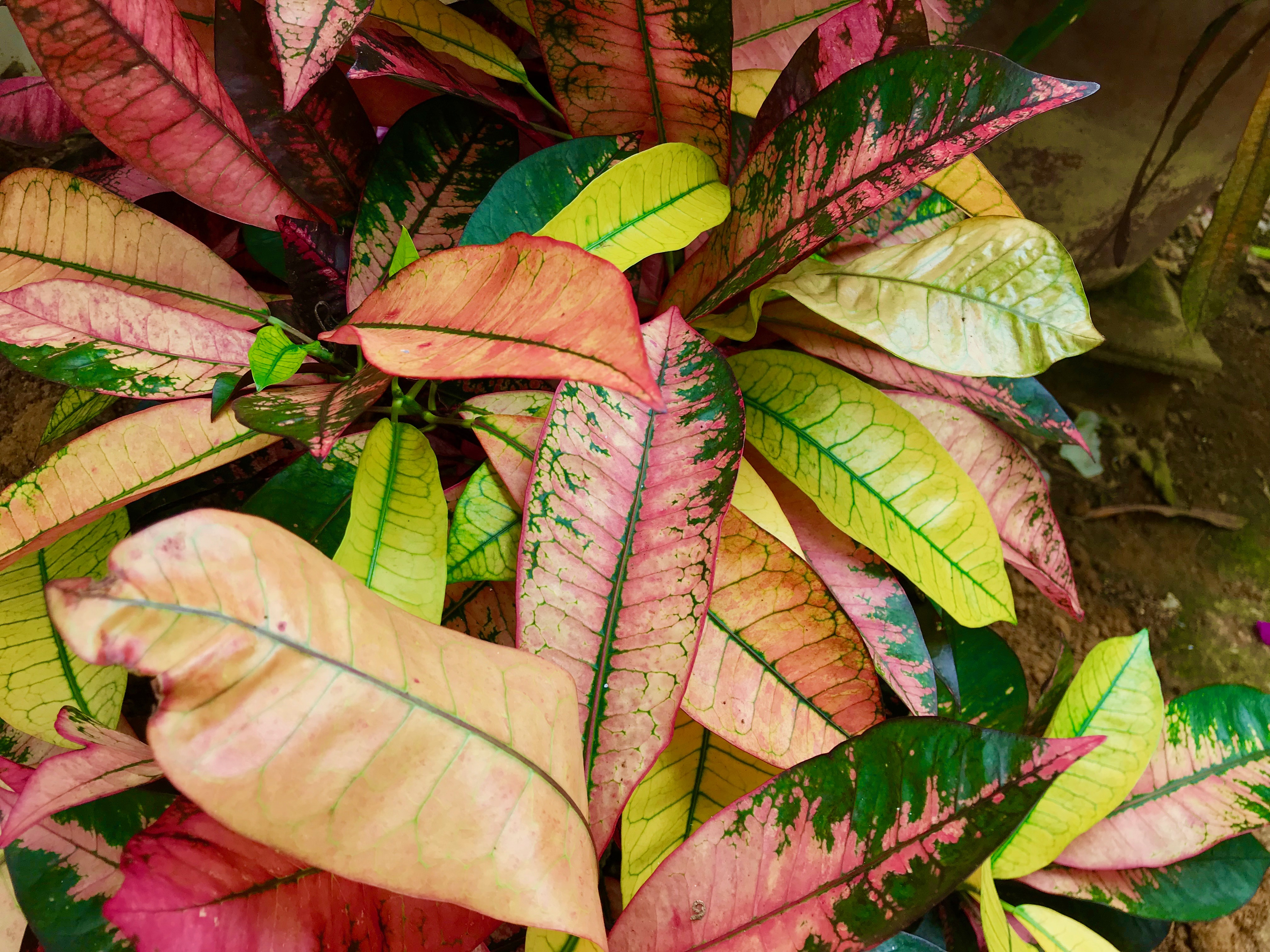
C. variegatum in Miyako-jima, Okinawa Prefecture

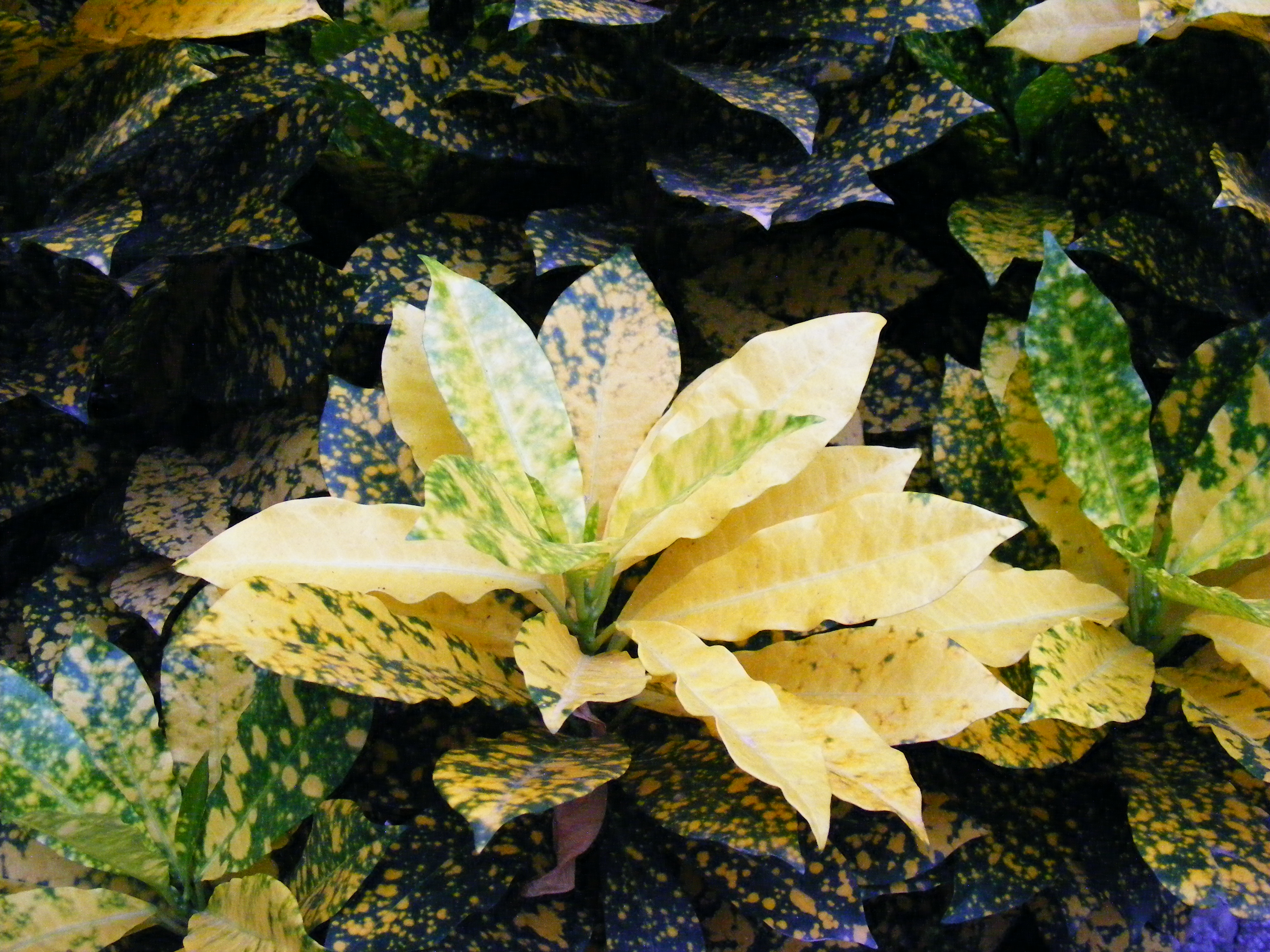
Completely yellow leaves on a specimen in Kolkata, India

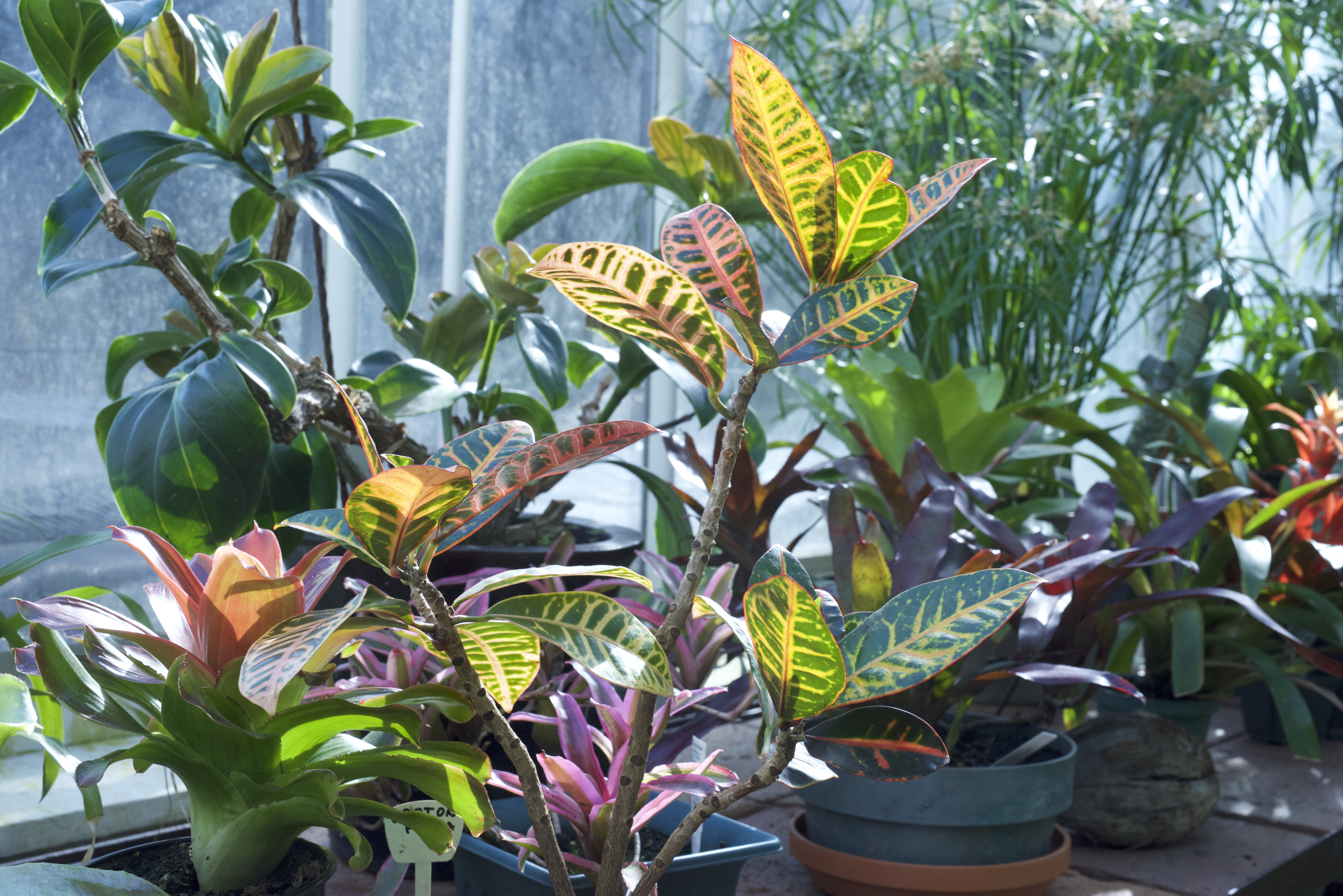
Croton 'Petra' in a botanical garden

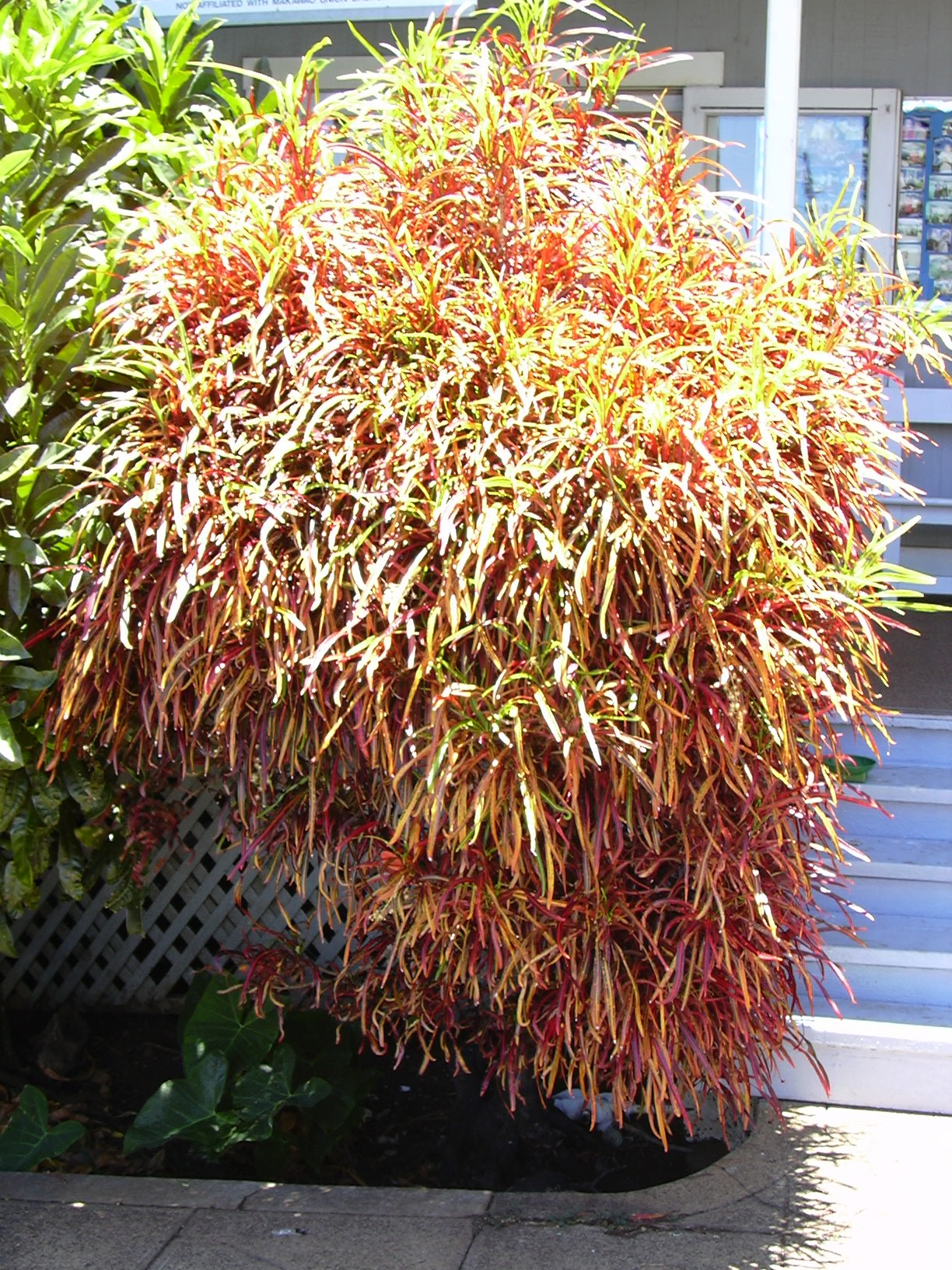
Narrow-leaved variety

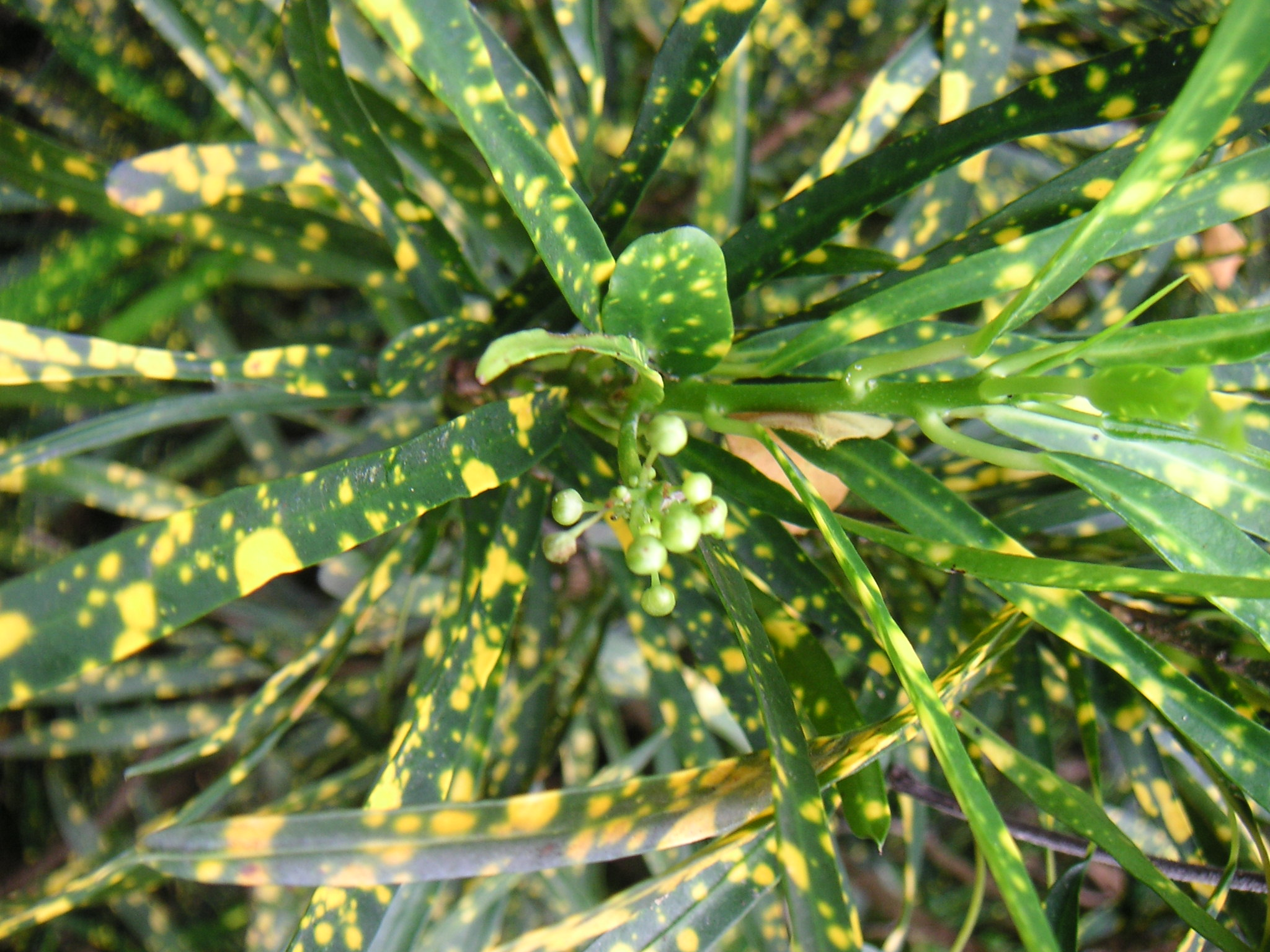
A green-yellow variegated variety

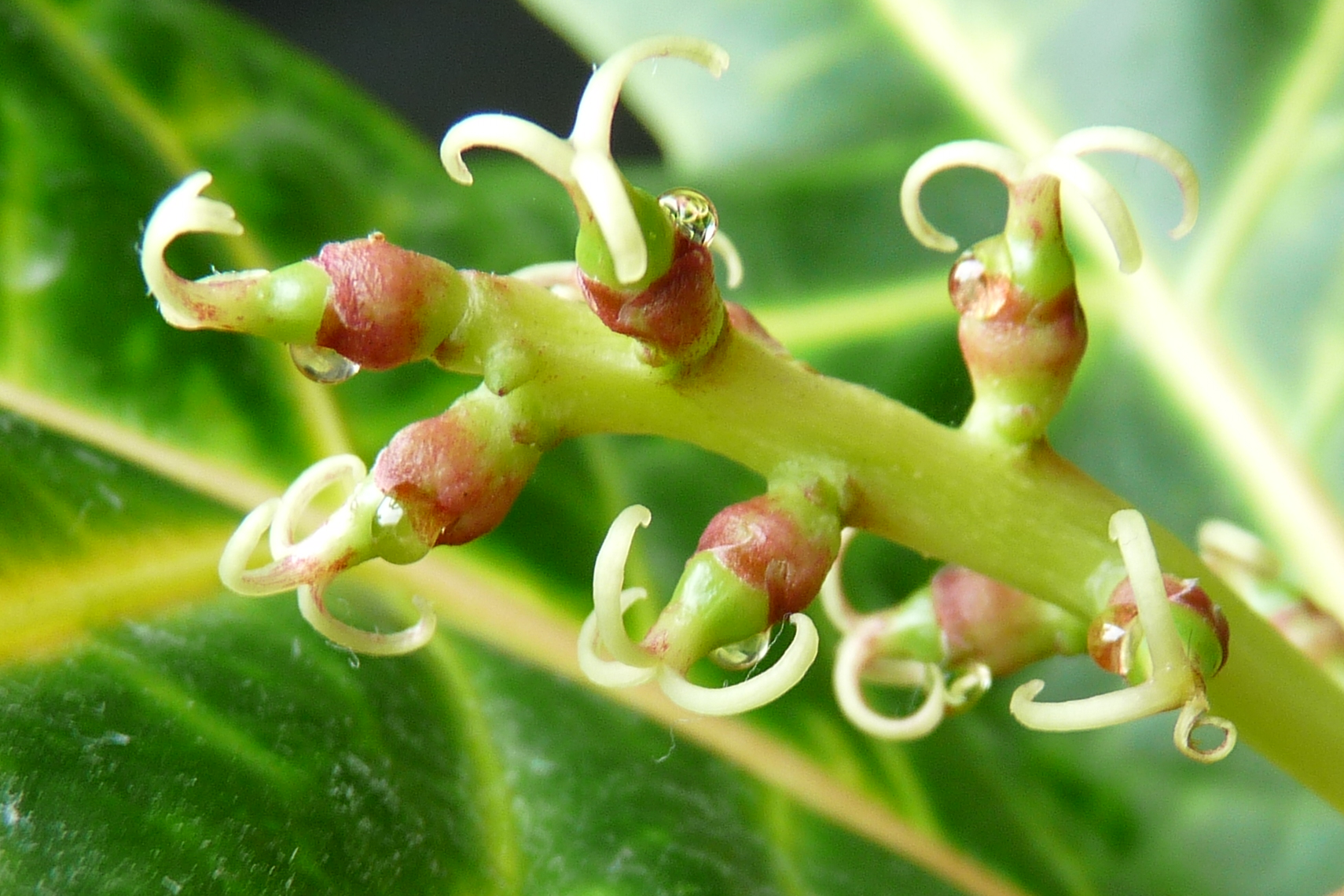
Female flowers

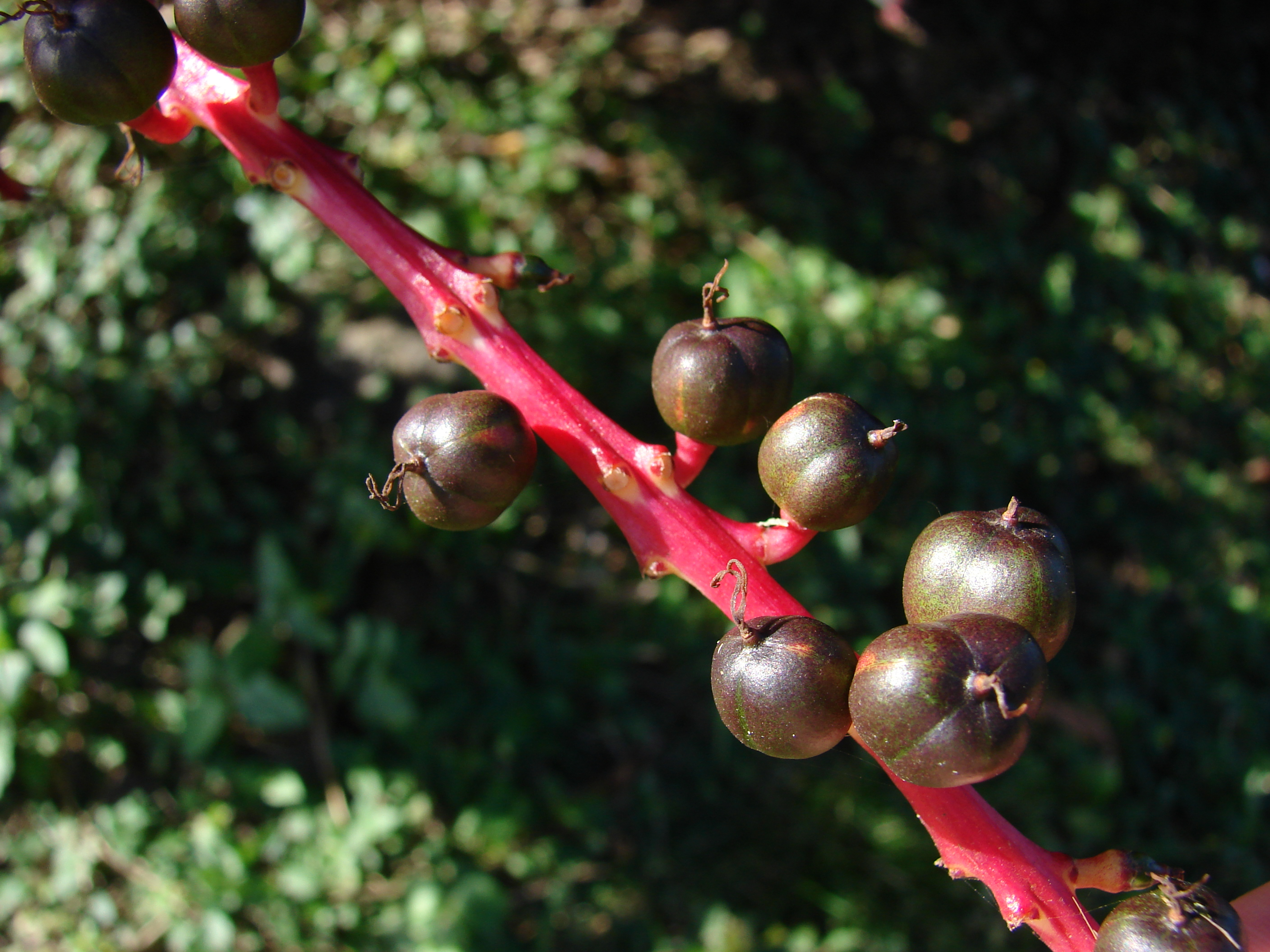
Young fruits
