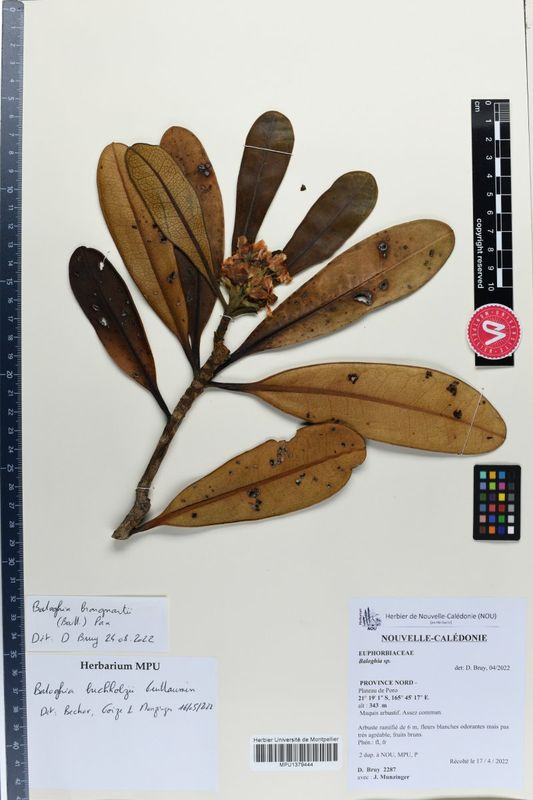

Conservation status
- Near Threatened (IUCN 3.1)

Scientific classification
- Kingdom: Plantae
- Clade: Embryophytes
- Clade: Tracheophytes
- Clade: Spermatophytes
- Clade: Angiosperms
- Clade: Eudicots
- Clade: Rosids
- Order: Malpighiales
- Family: Euphorbiaceae
- Genus: Baloghia
- Species: B. brongniartii

Binomial name
- Baloghia brongniartii Pax

Synonyms
- Codiaeum brongniartii Baill.

= Baloghia brongniartii =

Species of flowering plant

Baloghia brongniartii is a species of flowering plant in the family Euphorbiaceae. It is a shrub or tree enedmic to New Caledonia. The species was described in 1911, and is listed as Near Threatened by the IUCN.

== Taxonomy ==
The species was described by Ferdinand Albin Pax in 1911.

== Distribution ==
Baloghia brongniartii is native to the wet tropical biome of east-central New Caledonia. It is restricted to the east coast of Grande Terre, from Yaté to Houaïlou. The species has an estimated extent of occurrence of 1,289 square kilometres (498 sq mi).

The species grows in shrublands, on ultramafic substrates, at altitudes of 35–500 metres (115–1,640 ft).

== Description ==
Baloghia brongniartii is a shrub or tree.

== Conservation ==
In 2018, the IUCN assessed Baloghia brongniartii as Near Threatened. The species is threatened by fires, mining, and the invasive Rusa deer. It is not legally protected, but occurs in Réserve Naturelle du Barrage de Yaté, a protected area.
