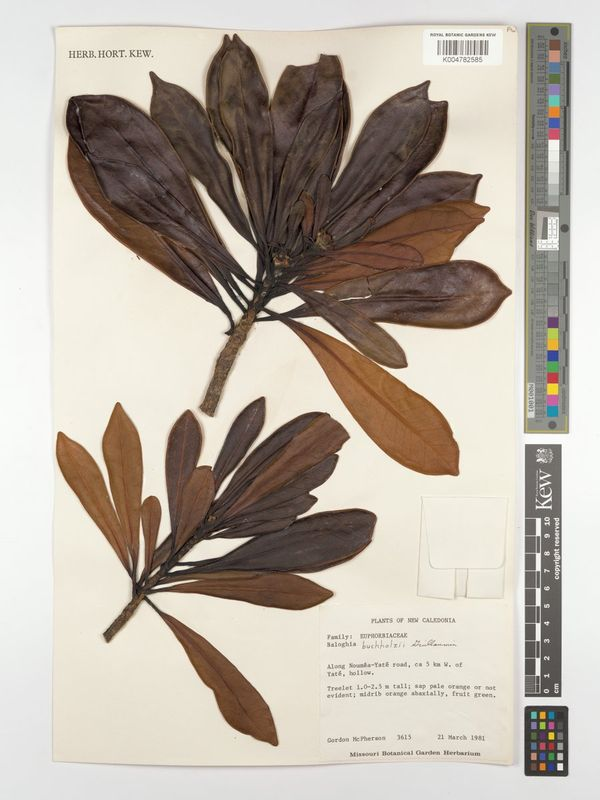

Conservation status
- Least Concern (IUCN 3.1)

Scientific classification
- Kingdom: Plantae
- Clade: Embryophytes
- Clade: Tracheophytes
- Clade: Spermatophytes
- Clade: Angiosperms
- Clade: Eudicots
- Clade: Rosids
- Order: Malpighiales
- Family: Euphorbiaceae
- Genus: Baloghia
- Species: B. buchholzii

Binomial name
- Baloghia buchholzii Guillaumin

Synonyms
- Baloghia mackeeana Guillaumin

= Baloghia buchholzii =

Species of flowering plant

Baloghia buchholzii is a species of flowering plant in the family Euphorbiaceae. It is a shrub or tree endemic to New Caledonia. The species was described in 1949, and is listed as of Least Concern by the IUCN.

== Taxonomy ==
Baloghia buchholzii was described by André Guillaumin in 1949. It may be two distinct species.

== Distribution ==
Baloghia buchholzii is endemic to the wet tropical biome of New Caledonia. Its distribution on Grande Terre is wide and discontinuous. The species' extent of occurrence is around 9,075 square kilometres (3,504 sq mi).

The species grows in humid, dense forests, on ultramafic and volcanic sediments, at elevations of 150–1,250 metres (490–4,100 ft).

== Description ==
Baloghia buchholzii is a shrub or tree. It grows 0.5–6 metres (1.6–19.7 ft) high.

== Conservation ==
In 2020, the IUCN assessed Baloghia buchholzii as of Least Concern. It does not face major threats. The species is not legally protected, but does occur in protected areas, including Mount Humboldt.
