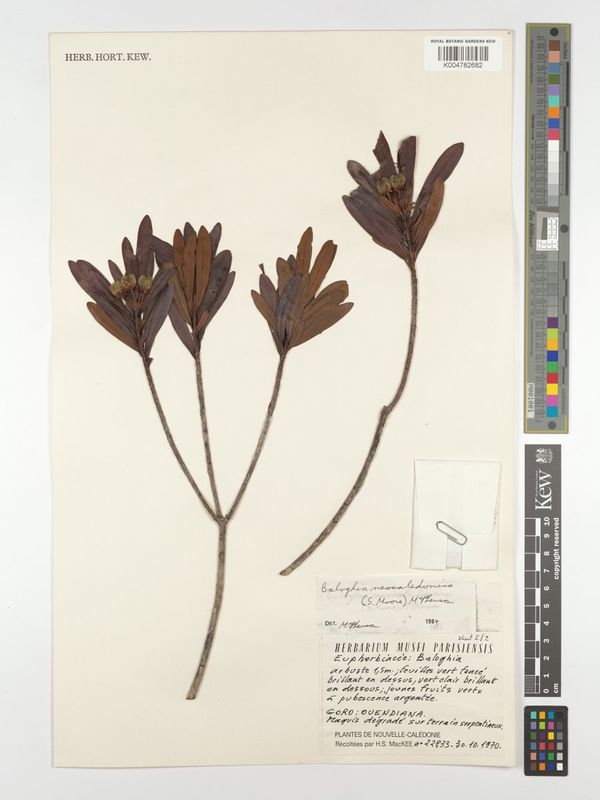

Conservation status
- Vulnerable (IUCN 3.1)

Scientific classification
- Kingdom: Plantae
- Clade: Embryophytes
- Clade: Tracheophytes
- Clade: Spermatophytes
- Clade: Angiosperms
- Clade: Eudicots
- Clade: Rosids
- Order: Malpighiales
- Family: Euphorbiaceae
- Genus: Baloghia
- Species: B. neocaledonica

Binomial name
- Baloghia neocaledonica (S.Moore) McPherson

Synonyms
- Ricinocarpos neocaledonicus S.Moore

= Baloghia neocaledonica =

Species of flowering plant

Baloghia neocaledonica is a species of flowering plant in the family Euphorbiaceae. It is a shrub endemic to New Caledonia. The species was described in 1921, and is listed as Vulnerable by the IUCN.

== Taxonomy ==
The species was described by Spencer Le Marchant Moore in 1921. Moore placed it in the genus Ricinocarpos. In 1987, Gordon McPherson moved the species to Baloghia.

== Distribution ==
Baloghia neocaledonica is native to the wet tropical biome of south-east New Caledonia. It is endemic to New Caledonia, and has a discontinous distribution. It is present in Yaté, and on the south-east coast of Grande Terre. The extimated extent of occurrence is 1,186 square kilometres (458 sq mi).

The species grows in shrublands and gallery forests, on ultramafic substrates, at elevations of 50–350 metres (160–1,150 ft).

== Description ==
Baloghia neocaledonica is a shrub.

== Conservation ==
In 2018, the IUCN assessed Baloghia neocaledonica as Vulnerable. It is threatened by mining and fires. The species is not legally protected, and is not present in protected areas.
