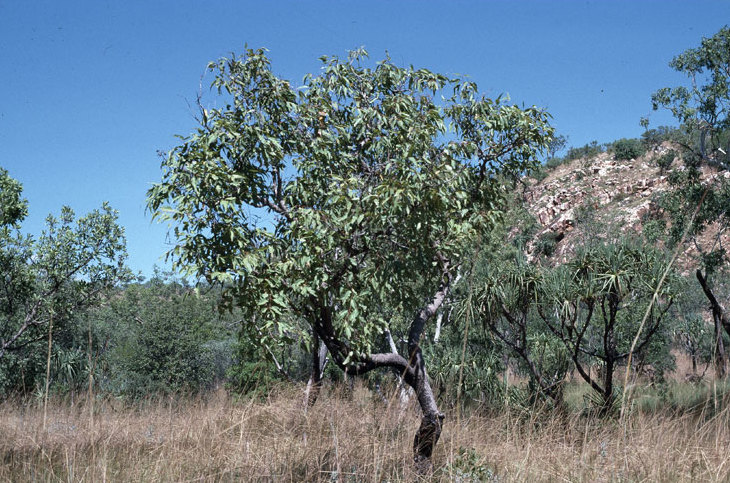
- At March Fly Glen, Wunaamin Miliwundi Ranges

Scientific classification
- Kingdom: Plantae
- Clade: Tracheophytes
- Clade: Angiosperms
- Clade: Eudicots
- Clade: Rosids
- Order: Myrtales
- Family: Myrtaceae
- Genus: Corymbia
- Species: C. ptychocarpa

Binomial name
- Corymbia ptychocarpa (F.Muell.) K.D.Hill & L.A.S.Johnson

Synonyms
- Eucalyptus ptychocarpa F.Muell.

= Corymbia ptychocarpa =

Swamp bloodwood

Species of plant

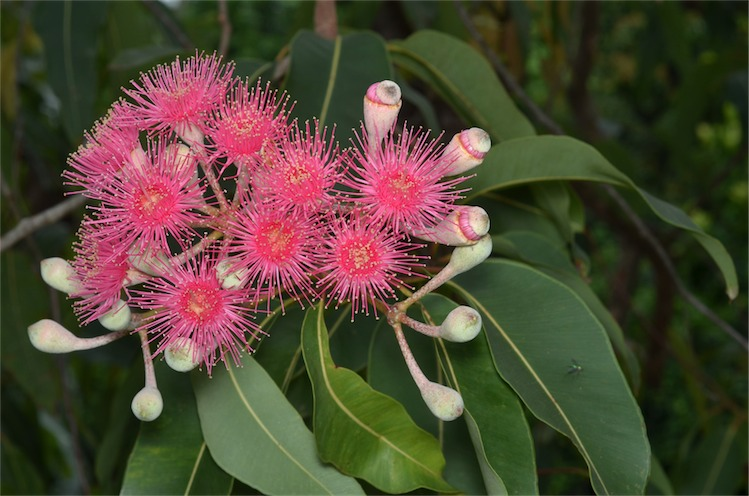
Buds and flowers

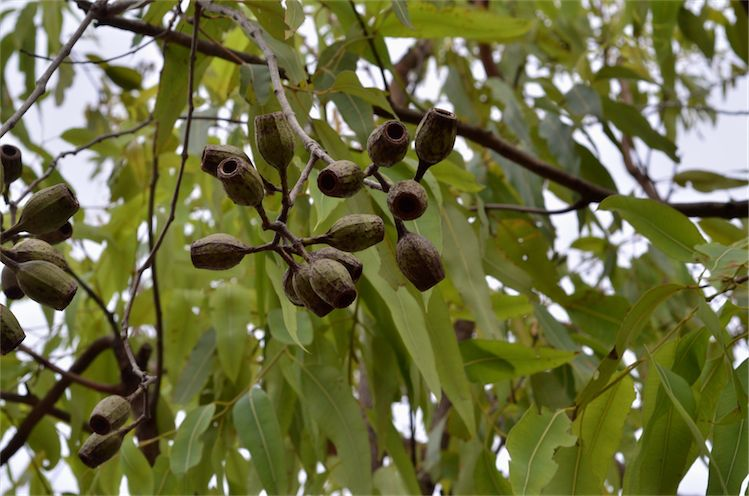
Fruit

Corymbia ptychocarpa, commonly known as swamp bloodwood or spring bloodwood, is a species of tree that is endemic to northwestern Australia. It has rough bark on the trunk and branches, broadly lance-shaped adult leaves, flower buds in groups of seven, creamy yellow, pink or red flowers, and barrel-shaped, ribbed fruit.

== Description ==
Corymbia ptychocarpa is a tree that typically grows to a height of 4.5 to 20 metres (15 to 66 ft) and has thick, rough, tessellated, brownish bark on the trunk and branches. It has the form of a crooked tree that tends to flop when young and often has drooping branches. Young plants and coppice regrowth have oblong to round or elliptical, later egg-shaped leaves that are 60–300 mm (2.4–11.8 in) long, 70–130 mm (2.8–5.1 in) wide and petiolate. Adult leaves are leathery, paler on the lower surface, broadly lance-shaped, 110–460 mm (4.3–18.1 in) long and 27–130 mm (1.1–5.1 in) wide, tapering to a petiole 15–40 mm (0.6–1.6 in) long. The midrib is pale yellow in contrast to the green lamina and the lateral veins are parallel to each other. The flowers are borne on the ends of branchlets on a branched peduncle 10–60 mm (0.4–2.4 in) long, each branch of the peduncle with seven buds on pedicels 10–34 mm (0.4–1.3 in) long. Mature buds are oval to pear-shaped, 13–24 mm (0.51–0.94 in) long and 11–18 mm (0.43–0.71 in) wide with a rounded to blunt-conical operculum. Flowering occurs from February to May and the flowers are creamy yellow, pink or red. The fruit is a woody, barrel-shaped capsule 32–55 mm (1.3–2.2 in) long and 26–45 mm (1.0–1.8 in) wide with about eight sharp ribs on the sides and the valves enclosed in the fruit.

== Taxonomy and naming ==
Swamp bloodwood was first formally described in 1859 by Ferdinand von Mueller, who gave it the name Eucalyptus ptychocarpa and published the description in the Journal of the Proceedings of the Linnean Society, Botany. In 1995 Ken Hill and Lawrence Alexander Sidney Johnson changed the name to Corymbia ptychocarpa.

In the same paper, Hill and Johnson described two subspecies and the names are accepted by the Australian Plant Census:

- Corymbia ptychocarpa subsp. aptycha K.D.Hill & L.A.S.Johnson that differs from the autonym in having the flower buds and fruit not or only indistinctly ribbed.
- Corymbia ptychocarpa (F.Muell.) K.D.Hill & L.A.S.Johnson subsp. ptychocarpa.

== Distribution and habitat ==
Corymbia ptychocarpa is found from the Kimberley region of Western Australia and through the Top End of the Northern Territory to near Doomadgee in far north-western Queensland. It grows in sandy soils and alluvium along watercourses and near springs. In the Northern Territory it occurs on the Arnhem Plateau, Daly Basin, Ord Victoria Plain, Pine Creek and the Victoria Bonaparte biogeographic regions.

Subspecies aptycha is restricted to the Top End between the Cobourg Peninsula, Yirrkala and El Sharana in Arnhem Land.

It is also grown as a street tree in parts of Queensland, such as Cairns and Townsville.

== See also ==
- List of Corymbia species
