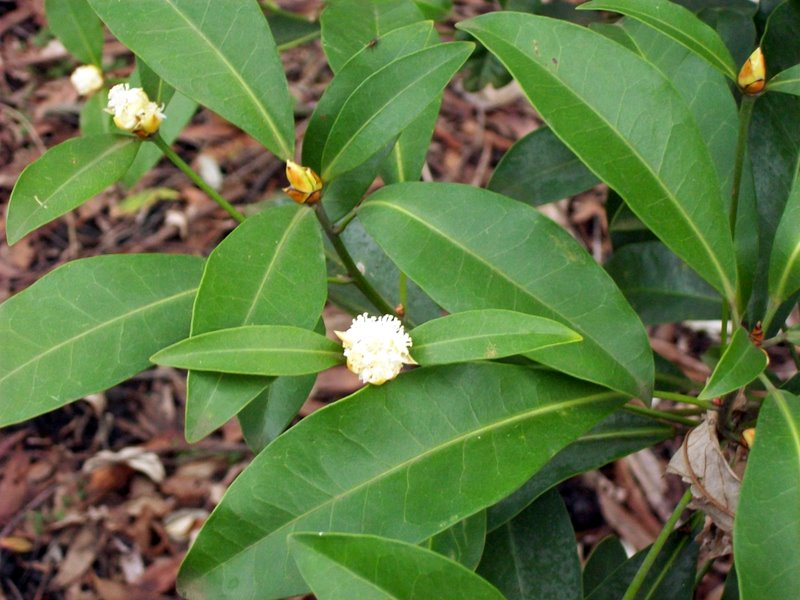
- Baloghia marmorata

Scientific classification
- Kingdom: Plantae
- Clade: Embryophytes
- Clade: Tracheophytes
- Clade: Spermatophytes
- Clade: Angiosperms
- Clade: Eudicots
- Clade: Rosids
- Order: Malpighiales
- Family: Euphorbiaceae
- Subfamily: Crotonoideae
- Tribe: Codiaeae
- Genus: Baloghia; Endl.

Type species
- Baloghia lucida Endl.

Synonyms
- Steigeria Müll.Arg.

= Baloghia =

Genus of flowering plants

Baloghia is a genus of plants in the family Euphorbiaceae first described as a genus in 1833. It is native to Australia (Queensland, New South Wales, Lord Howe I., Norfolk Island), and New Caledonia. Cocconerion is a close relative.

Species

1. Baloghia alternifolia – New Caledonia
2. Baloghia anisomera – New Caledonia
3. Baloghia balansae – New Caledonia
4. Baloghia brongniartii – New Caledonia
5. Baloghia buchholzii – New Caledonia
6. Baloghia bureavii – New Caledonia
7. Baloghia deplanchei – New Caledonia
8. Baloghia drimiflora – New Caledonia
9. Baloghia inophylla – Queensland, New South Wales, Norfolk I., Lord Howe I., New Caledonia, Loyalty Is.
10. Baloghia marmorata – Queensland, New South Wales
11. Baloghia montana – New Caledonia
12. Baloghia neocaledonica – New Caledonia
13. Baloghia parviflora – Atherton Tableland
14. Baloghia pininsularis – Îsle des Pins SE of New Caledonia
15. Baloghia pulchella – Mt. Dzumac in New Caledonia

Formerly included

moved to Austrobuxus Fontainea Scagea

1. B. carunculata – Austrobuxus carunculatus
2. B. oligostemon – Scagea oligostemon
3. B. pancheri – Fontainea pancheri
