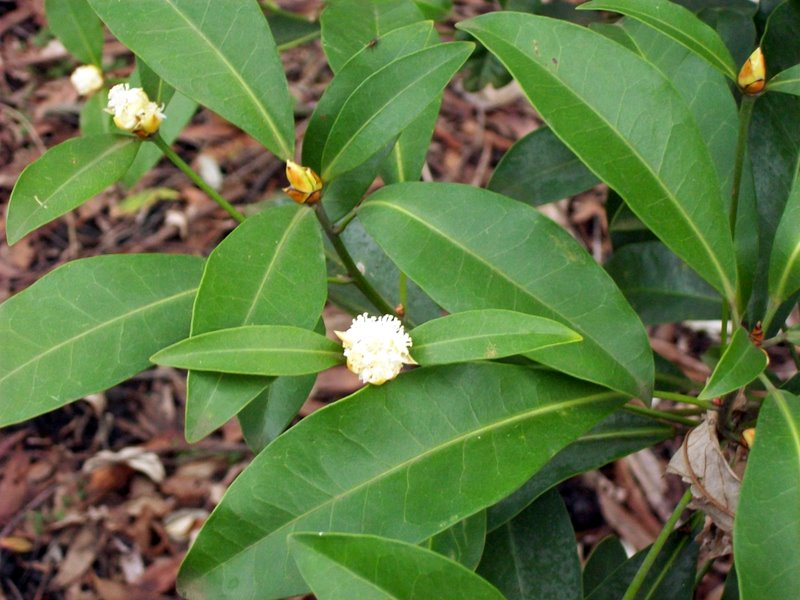
- Leaves and male flowers of Baloghia marmorata

Scientific classification
- Kingdom: Plantae
- Clade: Embryophytes
- Clade: Tracheophytes
- Clade: Spermatophytes
- Clade: Angiosperms
- Clade: Eudicots
- Clade: Rosids
- Order: Malpighiales
- Family: Euphorbiaceae
- Genus: Baloghia
- Species: B. marmorata

Binomial name
- Baloghia marmorata C.T.White

= Baloghia marmorata =

Marbled baloghia

Species of tree

Baloghia marmorata is a rare rainforest plant of eastern Australia. It is commonly known as the marbled baloghia.

== Distribution ==
Occurring in a few places in the Big Scrub, such as Victoria Park Nature Reserve and Davis Scrub Nature Reserve, and as far north as Gympie in Queensland, the habitat is subtropical rainforest at low altitude on red brown basaltic soils, with a high rainfall.

== Description ==
A small tree reaching 8 metres in height and a trunk diameter of 8 cm. The trunk is usually straight with fairly smooth bark, creamy and green with some brown vertical streaks. Small branches are smooth and slender, green near the leaves.

Leaves are alternate on the stem, not toothed, lanceolate to reverse ovate in shape, glossy green, 8 to 15 cm long, and 2 to 5 cm wide. A pair of glands occurs on the edge of the leaf, about 5 mm from where the stalk joins the leaf. Leaf stalks are 2 to 4 cm long, with a grooved channel on the upper side.

Creamy flowers occur in the months of July to September. Male and female flowers form on separate racemes. The fruit matures from August to October, being a fawn capsule around 2 cm in diameter, which is three or four-celled with a single round seed about 1.5 cm long. It is coloured dark red with cream spots, giving a marbled appearance. Regeneration from seed is not well known; however, cuttings strike well.
