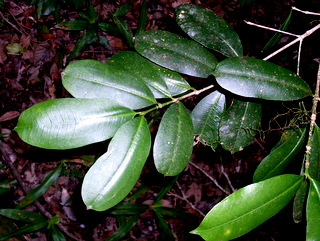
- At the Allyn River, Barrington Tops, New South Wales

Conservation status
- Least Concern (NCA)

Scientific classification
- Kingdom: Plantae
- Clade: Embryophytes
- Clade: Tracheophytes
- Clade: Spermatophytes
- Clade: Angiosperms
- Clade: Eudicots
- Clade: Rosids
- Order: Malpighiales
- Family: Euphorbiaceae
- Genus: Baloghia
- Species: B. inophylla

Binomial name
- Baloghia inophylla (G.Forst.) P.S.Green

Synonyms
- Homotypic: Codiaeum inophyllum (G.Forst.) Müll.Arg.; Croton inophyllus G.Forst.; Rottlera inophyllum (G.Forst.) Endl.; Trevia inophyllum (G.Forst.) Spreng.; Heterotypic: Baloghia lucida Endl.; Codiaeum lucidum (Endl.) Müll.Arg.; Synaspisma peltatum Endl.

= Baloghia inophylla =

Scrub bloodwood

Species of plant in the spurge family

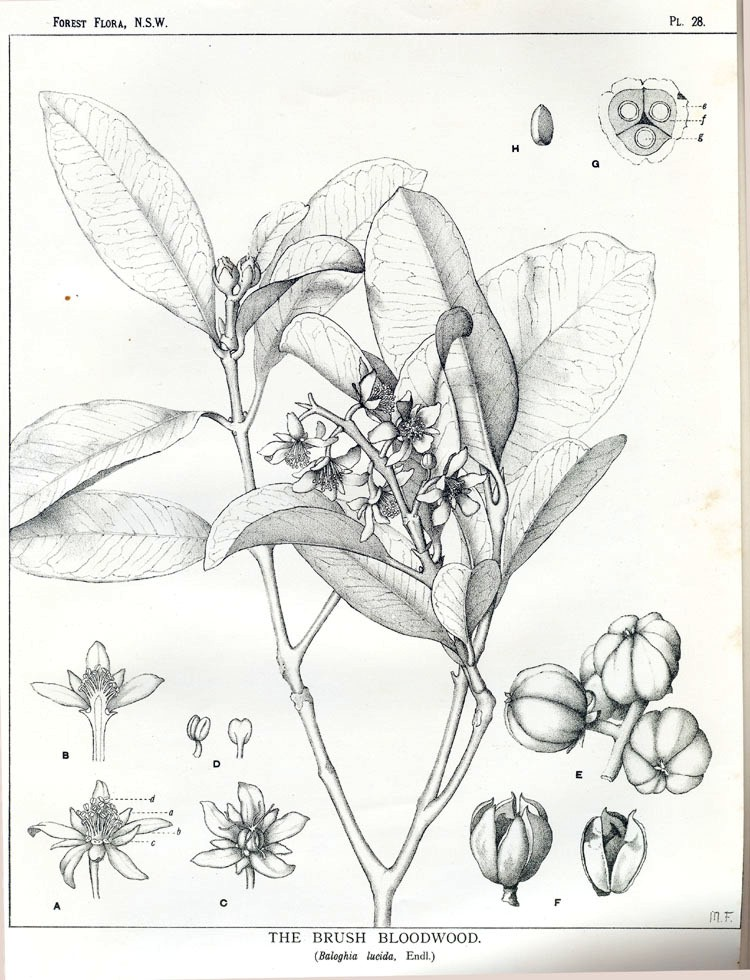
Drawing by Margaret Flockton

Baloghia inophylla, commonly known as the scrub bloodwood, brush bloodwood or ivory birch, is a plant in the spurge family Euphorbiaceae, native to rainforests of eastern Australia and New Caledonia.

== Description ==
Baloghia inophylla is a medium-sized tree, reaching 25 metres (82 ft) in height and with a trunk diameter of 50 cm (20 in). The trunk is usually cylindrical, though some tree bases are fluted. The bark is creamy brown, with reddish and brown markings. The bark also features raised squarish plates of bark.

Leaves are thick and glossy, 7–13 cm (3–5 in) long. They are opposite, simple, not toothed, mostly oblong in shape, though at other times elliptical or oval. Identification of this species is made easier when noticing the blunt leaf point and nearly horizontal leaf veins. At the base of the leaf are two swollen glands. Leaf stalks are 8 mm (0.3 in) long, and somewhat channelled on the upper side.

Creamy pink flowers occur on racemes from May to January. The five-petaled flower is fragrant, relatively large and attractive. Male and female flowers form on separate racemes.

The fruit matures from February to May, though occasionally at other times of the year. It is a brown roundish capsule 12 to 18 mm (0.5 to 0.7 in) long. Inside are three cells, with a single mottled brown seed inside, 8 mm (0.3 in) long, although many capsules contain no seeds. Fresh seed germinates reliably, and cuttings strike well.

== Taxonomy ==
This plant was first formally described by the German botanist Johann George Adam Forster, who gave it the name Croton inophyllus. His description was based on a specimen from New Caledonia, and was published in his book Florulae insularum Australium :prodromus in 1786.. A number of other names have since been published by other authors (see Synonyms), some based on the same plant specimens that were used for Forster's original description (homotypic names), and some based on other specimens of the plant (heterotypic names). In 1986 all of these alternate names were transferred to the new combination Baloghia inophylla by the English botanist Peter Shaw Green who published his work in the Kew Bulletin.

== Distribution and habitat ==
The scrub bloodwood occurs along almost the entire east coast of Australia, from Tilba Tilba in southern New South Wales, to Coen on Cape York Peninsula. It also occurs on Lord Howe and Norfolk Islands as well as New Caledonia. The habitat is tropical, subtropical and warm temperate rainforest. The altitudinal range in north Queensland is 400 to 900 m (1,300 to 3,000 ft).
