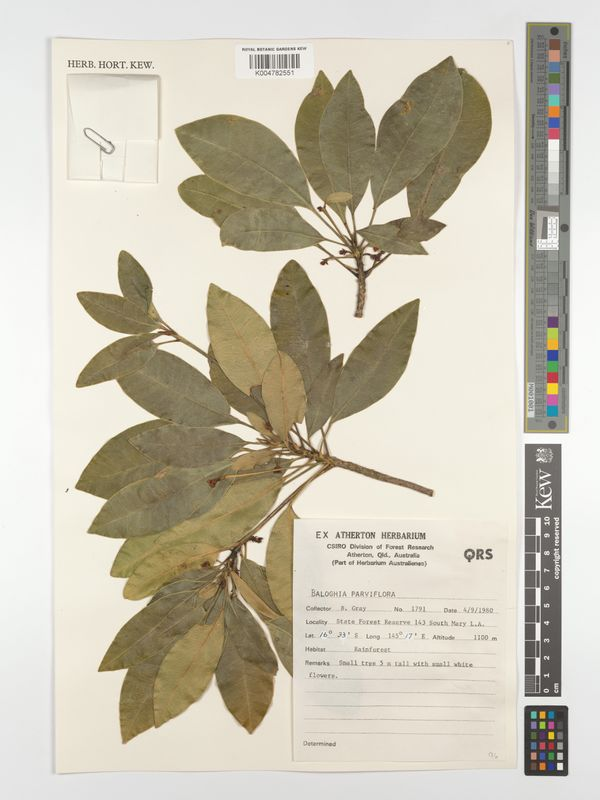

Conservation status
- Least Concern (IUCN 3.1)

Scientific classification
- Kingdom: Plantae
- Clade: Embryophytes
- Clade: Tracheophytes
- Clade: Spermatophytes
- Clade: Angiosperms
- Clade: Eudicots
- Clade: Rosids
- Order: Malpighiales
- Family: Euphorbiaceae
- Genus: Baloghia
- Species: B. parviflora

Binomial name
- Baloghia parviflora C.T.White

= Baloghia parviflora =

Species of flowering plant

Baloghia parviflora is a species of flowering plant in the family Euphorbiaceae. It is a shrub or tree with alternately arranged leaves, and white flowers. The species is endemic to Queensland, Australia.

Baloghia parviflora was described in 1942, and is listed as of Least Concern by the IUCN.

== Taxonomy ==
The species was described by Cyril Tenison White in 1942.

== Distribution ==
Baloghia parviflora is native to the wet tropical biome of Atherton Tableland, Queensland, Australia. It is endemic to Queensland.

The species grows in the understorey of mountainous rainforests, at elevations of 700–1,000 metres (2,300–3,300 ft).

== Description ==
Baloghia parviflora is a shrub or tree that grows up to 20 metres (66 ft) high. It sometimes has a watery, pale red exudate.

The leaves are arranged alternately, and have 6–62 millimetres (0.24–2.44 in) stems. The leaves are cuneate-oblanceolate, obovate or oblong, 2.5–23 centimetres (0.98–9.06 in) long, and 0.7–8 centimetres (0.28–3.15 in) wide.

Baloghia parviflora has white flowers. The male flowers are 3–4 millimetres (0.12–0.16 in) long, 4.6–5 millimetres (0.18–0.20 in) wide, and grow on 1–2 millimetres (0.039–0.079 in) stems. The sepals are lanceolate-ovate, 3–3.5 millimetres (0.12–0.14 in) long, and around 2 millimetres (0.079 in) wide. The petals are lanceolate-ovate, 4–4.5 millimetres (0.16–0.18 in) long, and 2–2.2 millimetres (0.079–0.087 in) wide. The male flowers have ten to fifteen stamens.

The female flowers are 4–5 millimetres (0.16–0.20 in) long, 7–8 millimetres (0.28–0.31 in) wide, and grow on 2–4 millimetres (0.079–0.157 in) stems. The sepals are lanceolate-ovate, around 4 millimetres (0.16 in) long, and 2.5–3 millimetres (0.098–0.118 in) wide. The petals are lanceolate-ovate, 4–5.5 millimetres (0.16–0.22 in) long, and around 3 millimetres (0.12 in) wide. The plant flowers throughout the year.

The fruit is round, around 12 millimetres (0.47 in) long, and 14–16 millimetres (0.55–0.63 in) wide. The seeds are round or ellipsoid, 7–8 millimetres (0.28–0.31 in) long, and 5–5.5 millimetres (0.20–0.22 in) wide. The seeds take three to four weeks to germinate. The plant fruits throughout the year.

== Conservation ==
In 2023, the IUCN assessed Baloghia parviflora as of Least Concern. It has a large population, and faces no major threats.
