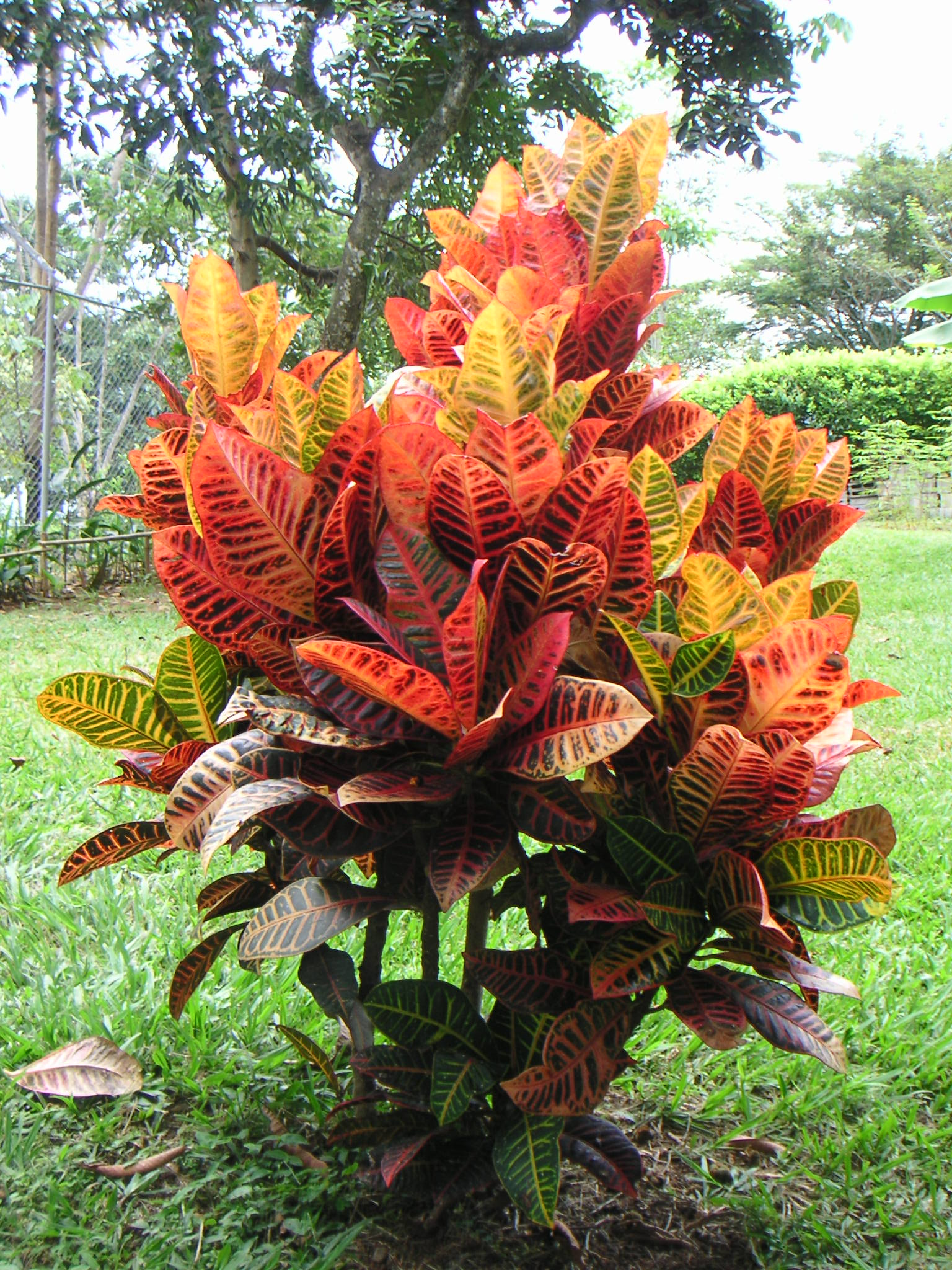
- Codiaeum variegatum

Scientific classification
- Kingdom: Plantae
- Clade: Embryophytes
- Clade: Tracheophytes
- Clade: Spermatophytes
- Clade: Angiosperms
- Clade: Eudicots
- Clade: Rosids
- Order: Malpighiales
- Family: Euphorbiaceae
- Subfamily: Crotonoideae
- Tribe: Codiaeae
- Genus: Codiaeum; A.Juss.

Synonyms
- Crozophyla Raf.; Junghuhnia Miq.; Phyllaurea Lour., rejected name; Synaspisma Endl.

= Codiaeum =

Genus of flowering plants

Codiaeum is a genus of plants under the family Euphorbiaceae first described as a genus in 1824. It is native to insular Southeast Asia, northern Australia and Papuasia.

They are shrubs with leathery leaves and often confused with the genus Croton. Some species, especially Codiaeum variegatum, are cultivated as houseplants.

Species

1. Codiaeum affine - Banggi
2. Codiaeum bractiferum - Lesser Sundas, Maluku
3. Codiaeum ciliatum - Philippines
4. Codiaeum finisterrae - NE New Guinea
5. Codiaeum hirsutum - Philippines
6. Codiaeum ludovicianum - Louisiade
7. Codiaeum luzonicum - Philippines
8. Codiaeum macgregorii - Philippines
9. Codiaeum megalanthum - Philippines
10. Codiaeum membranaceum - Cape York Pen
11. Codiaeum oligogynum - New Caledonia
12. Codiaeum palawanense - Palawan
13. Codiaeum peltatum - New Caledonia incl Loyalty
14. Codiaeum stellingianum - Kai Is, New Guinea
15. Codiaeum tenerifolium - New Guinea
16. Codiaeum trichocalyx - Luzon
17. Codiaeum variegatum - Indonesia, Philippines, New Guinea, Bismarck, Solomon, Fiji

Formerly included

moved to other genera: Austrobuxus Baloghia Blachia Fontainea Sphyranthera Trigonostemon

1. C. alternifolium - Baloghia alternifolia
2. C. andamanicum - Blachia andamanica
3. C. aurantiacum - Trigonostemon aurantiacus
4. C. balansae - Baloghia balansae
5. C. brongniartii - Baloghia brongniartii
6. C. bureavii - Baloghia bureavii
7. C. carunculatum - Austrobuxus carunculatus
8. C. deplanchei - Baloghia deplanchei
9. C. drimiflorum - Baloghia drimiflora
10. C. inophyllum - Baloghia inophylla
11. C. lucidum - Baloghia inophylla
12. C. lutescens - Sphyranthera lutescens
13. C. montanum - Baloghia montana
14. C. pancheri - Fontainea pancheri
15. C. pentzii - Blachia pentzii
16. C. umbellatum - Blachia umbellata
