= List of Hylaeus species =

This is a list of 744 species in the genus Hylaeus, masked bees.

== Hylaeus species ==
- Hylaeus aberrans (Bridwell, 1919)^{i c g}
- Hylaeus abjunctus Cockerell, 1936^{i c g}
- Hylaeus aborigensis Dathe, 1994^{i c g}
- Hylaeus absolutus (Gribodo, 1894)^{i c g}
- Hylaeus absonulus Cockerell, 1936^{i c g}
- Hylaeus abyssinicus (Alfken, 1905)^{i c g}
- Hylaeus acariphorus Snelling, 1985^{i c g}
- Hylaeus accipitris (Cockerell, 1914)^{i c g}
- Hylaeus acer Dathe, 1980^{i c g}
- Hylaeus adamauanis Dathe, 2015^{g}
- Hylaeus adriaticus (Warncke, 1972)^{i c g}
- Hylaeus advocatus (Nurse, 1903)^{i c g}
- Hylaeus aenigmus (Viereck, 1903)^{i c g}
- Hylaeus affinis (Smith, 1853)^{i c g b}
- Hylaeus agilis (Smith, 1876)^{i c g}
- Hylaeus akoko Magnacca & Daly, 2003^{i c g}
- Hylaeus alampes Moure, 1942^{i c g}
- Hylaeus albocuneatus (Cockerell, 1913)^{i c g}
- Hylaeus albomaculatus (Smith, 1879)^{i c g}
- Hylaeus albonitens (Cockerell, 1905)^{i c g}
- Hylaeus albonotatus (Walker, 1871)^{i c g}
- Hylaeus albozebratus Michener, 1965^{i c g}
- Hylaeus alcyoneus (Erichson, 1842)^{i c g}
- Hylaeus alexandrinus (Warncke, 1992)^{i c g}
- Hylaeus alfkeni (Friese, 1913)^{i c g}
- Hylaeus alocaspidus Snelling, 1975^{i c g}
- Hylaeus alpinus (Morawitz, 1867)^{i c g}
- Hylaeus altaicus Dathe, 1986^{i c g}
- Hylaeus amatulus (Cockerell, 1922)^{i c g}
- Hylaeus amatus (Cockerell, 1909)^{i c g}
- Hylaeus amazonicus (Gribodo, 1894)^{i c g}
- Hylaeus amelanocephalus Rayment, 1954^{i c g}
- Hylaeus ameliae Cockerell, 1942^{i c g}
- Hylaeus amharicus Dathe, 2014^{g}
- Hylaeus amiculiformis (Cockerell, 1909)^{i c g}
- Hylaeus amiculinus (Cockerell, 1922)^{i c g}
- Hylaeus amiculus (Smith, 1879)^{i c g}
- Hylaeus ancoratus (Cockerell, 1912)^{i c g}
- Hylaeus andrenoides (Perkins, 1899)^{i c g}
- Hylaeus angustatus (Schenck, 1861)^{i c g}
- Hylaeus angustifrons Morawitz, 1876^{i c g}
- Hylaeus angustulus (Perkins, 1899)^{i c g}
- Hylaeus anmelanocephalus Rayment, 1954^{i c g}
- Hylaeus annularis (Kirby, 1802)^{i c g}
- Hylaeus annulatus (Linnaeus, 1758)^{i c g b}
- Hylaeus anomalus (Perkins, 1899)^{i c g}
- Hylaeus anthracinus (Smith, 1853)^{i c g}
- Hylaeus aralis (Cockerell, 1916)^{i c g}
- Hylaeus araxanus (Warncke, 1981)^{i c g}
- Hylaeus arenarius Morawitz, 1876^{i c g}
- Hylaeus armeniacus (Warncke, 1981)^{i c g}
- Hylaeus arnoldi (Friese, 1913)^{i c g}
- Hylaeus arsenicus (Vachal, 1901)^{i c g}
- Hylaeus asiaticus (Dalla Torre, 1896)^{i c g}
- Hylaeus asininus (Cockerell & Casad, 1895)^{i c g}
- Hylaeus asper (Vachal, 1909)^{i c g}
- Hylaeus asperithorax (Rayment, 1927)^{i c g}
- Hylaeus aspricollis (Vachal, 1901)^{i c g}
- Hylaeus assimulans (Perkins, 1899)^{i c g}
- Hylaeus aterrimus (Friese, 1911)^{i c}
- Hylaeus atriceps (Friese, 1911)^{i c g}
- Hylaeus atripes (Vachal, 1901)^{i c g}
- Hylaeus auriferus (Cockerell, 1918)^{i c g}
- Hylaeus azorae (Warncke, 1992)^{i c g}
- Hylaeus aztecus (Cresson, 1869)^{i c g}
- Hylaeus bacillarius (Cockerell, 1914)^{i c g}
- Hylaeus basalis (Smith, 1853)^{i c g b}
- Hylaeus basilautus (Rayment, 1953)^{i c g}
- Hylaeus basimacula (Cameron, 1904)^{i c g}
- Hylaeus basirufus (Vachal, 1910)^{i c g}
- Hylaeus baudinensis (Cockerell, 1905)^{i c g}
- Hylaeus beaumonti (Benoist, 1943)^{i c g}
- Hylaeus bellicosus (Cameron, 1897)^{i c g}
- Hylaeus benguetensis (Cockerell, 1919)^{i c g}
- Hylaeus benoisti Michener, 2000^{i c g}
- Hylaeus bequaerti (Schrottky, 1910)^{i c g}
- Hylaeus bequaertianus Bridwell, 1919^{i c g}
- Hylaeus bernhardi Dathe, 2014^{g}
- Hylaeus bertonii (Schrottky, 1907)^{i c g}
- Hylaeus bevisi (Cockerell, 1917)^{i c g}
- Hylaeus biarmicus (Warncke, 1992)^{i c g}
- Hylaeus bicoloratus (Smith, 1853)^{i c g}
- Hylaeus bicolorellus Michener, 1965^{i c g}
- Hylaeus bicuneatus (Cockerell, 1910)^{i c g}
- Hylaeus bidentatus (Smith, 1853)^{i c g}
- Hylaeus bifasciatus (Jurine, 1807)^{i c g}
- Hylaeus binotatus (Alfken, 1914)^{i c g}
- Hylaeus binus (Vachal, 1909)^{i c g}
- Hylaeus bipunctatus (Fabricius, 1798)^{i c g}
- Hylaeus biscutellus (Vachal, 1909)^{i c g}
- Hylaeus bituberculatus (Smith, 1879)^{i c g}
- Hylaeus blanchae Rayment, 1953^{i c g}
- Hylaeus bolivianus (Schrottky, 1910)^{i c g}
- Hylaeus boninensis Yasumatsu, 1955^{i c g}
- Hylaeus borchii Rayment, 1935^{i c g}
- Hylaeus borneensis (Cockerell, 1920)^{i c g}
- Hylaeus bothros (Schrottky, 1910)^{i c g}
- Hylaeus bouyssoui (Vachal, 1899)^{i c g}
- Hylaeus brachycephalus (Morawitz, 1868)^{i c g}
- Hylaeus brachyceratomerus (Moure, 1941)^{i c g}
- Hylaeus brasiliensis (Schrottky, 1910)^{i c g}
- Hylaeus braunsi (Alfken, 1905)^{i c g}
- Hylaeus breviceps Morawitz, 1876^{i c g}
- Hylaeus brevicornis Nylander, 1852^{i c g}
- Hylaeus brevior (Cockerell, 1918)^{i c g}
- Hylaeus breviradius (Vachal, 1901)^{i c g}
- Hylaeus bridwelli Ikudome, 1989^{i c g}
- Hylaeus buddhae Meade-Waldo, 1923^{i c g}
- Hylaeus burnsi (Michener, 1965)^{i c}
- Hylaeus caarendyensis (Schrottky, 1906)^{i c g}
- Hylaeus callosulus Meade-Waldo, 1923^{i c g}
- Hylaeus callosus (Cockerell, 1910)^{i c g}
- Hylaeus calvus (Metz, 1911)^{i c g b}
- Hylaeus camerunensis Dathe, 2014^{g}
- Hylaeus canariensis Erlandsson, 1983^{i c g}
- Hylaeus capicola (Alfken, 1914)^{i c g}
- Hylaeus capitosus (Smith, 1876)^{i c g}
- Hylaeus cardioscapus Cockerell, 1924^{i c g}
- Hylaeus cecidonastes Moure, 1972^{i c g}
- Hylaeus ceniberus (Cockerell, 1910)^{i c g}
- Hylaeus certus (Cockerell, 1921)^{i c g}
- Hylaeus cervinus (Warncke, 1992)^{i c g}
- Hylaeus chasanensis (Romankova, 1995)^{i c g}
- Hylaeus chimani Dathe, 2014^{g}
- Hylaeus chlorosomus (Cockerell, 1913)^{i c g}
- Hylaeus chlorostictus (Perkins, 1899)^{i c g}
- Hylaeus chromaticus (Cockerell, 1912)^{i c g}
- Hylaeus chrysaspis (Cockerell, 1910)^{i c g}
- Hylaeus chukar (Warncke, 1992)^{i c g}
- Hylaeus cinereus (Warncke, 1992)^{i c g}
- Hylaeus claviger (Cockerell)^{g}
- Hylaeus clavigerus (Cockerell, 1936)^{i c g}
- Hylaeus cliffordiellus Rayment, 1953^{i c g}
- Hylaeus clypearis (Schenck, 1853)^{i c g}
- Hylaeus cockerelli (Schrottky, 1906)^{i c g}
- Hylaeus colei Rayment, 1935^{i c g}
- Hylaeus coloradensis (Cockerell, 1896)^{i c g}
- Hylaeus communis Nylander, 1852^{i c g}
- Hylaeus concinnus Cockerell, 1924^{i c g}
- Hylaeus confluens (Smith, 1853)^{i c g}
- Hylaeus conformis Förster, 1871^{i c g}
- Hylaeus confusus Nylander, 1852^{i c g}
- Hylaeus coniceps (Blackburn, 1886)^{i c g}
- Hylaeus connectens (Perkins, 1899)^{i c g}
- Hylaeus conspicuus (Metz, 1911)^{i c g}
- Hylaeus constrictiformis (Cockerell, 1910)^{i c g}
- Hylaeus constrictus (Cockerell, 1905)^{i c g}
- Hylaeus contradictus (Cockerell, 1919)^{i c g}
- Hylaeus convergens Dathe, 2000^{i c g}
- Hylaeus cookii (Metz, 1911)^{i c g}
- Hylaeus coriaceus (Pérez, 1895)^{i c g}
- Hylaeus cornutus Curtis, 1831^{i c g}
- Hylaeus coroicensis (Cockerell, 1918)^{i c g}
- Hylaeus coronatulus (Cockerell, 1914)^{i c g}
- Hylaeus coronatus (Cockerell, 1905)^{i c g}
- Hylaeus costaricensis (Friese, 1917)^{i c}
- Hylaeus crabronoides (Perkins, 1899)^{i c g}
- Hylaeus crassanus (Warncke, 1972)^{i c g}
- Hylaeus crassifemoratus (Cockerell, 1922)^{i c g}
- Hylaeus cribellatus (Vachal, 1901)^{i c g}
- Hylaeus cribratus (Bridwell, 1919)^{i c g}
- Hylaeus crispulus Dathe, 1980^{i c g}
- Hylaeus cruentus (Vachal, 1910)^{i c g}
- Hylaeus crustatus (Vachal, 1909)^{i c g}
- Hylaeus culiciformis (Schrottky, 1906)^{i c g}
- Hylaeus cuneiferus (Cockerell, 1919)^{i c g}
- Hylaeus curtellus Moure, 1960^{i c g}
- Hylaeus curtulus (Vachal, 1910)^{i c g}
- Hylaeus curvicarinatus (Cameron, 1905)^{i c g}
- Hylaeus cuscoanus (Strand, 1911)^{i c g}
- Hylaeus cyaneomicans (Cockerell, 1910)^{i c g}
- Hylaeus cyanophilus (Cockerell, 1910)^{i c g}
- Hylaeus cyanurus (Kirby, 1802)^{i c g}
- Hylaeus cypricolus (Warncke, 1972)^{i c g}
- Hylaeus damascenus (Magretti, 1890)^{i c g}
- Hylaeus dathei Chen & Xu^{g}
- Hylaeus daviesiae Houston, 1981^{i c g}
- Hylaeus decaoctus (Warncke, 1992)^{i c g}
- Hylaeus deceptorius (Benoist, 1959)^{i c g}
- Hylaeus delicatus (Cockerell, 1911)^{i c g}
- Hylaeus dentiferellus (Strand, 1912)^{i c g}
- Hylaeus desertoris Houston, 1981^{i c g}
- Hylaeus dictyotus Snelling, 1982^{i c g}
- Hylaeus difficilis (Perkins, 1899)^{i c g}
- Hylaeus difformis (Eversmann, 1852)^{i c g}
- Hylaeus digitatus (Houston, 1975)^{i c g}
- Hylaeus dilatatus (Kirby, 1802)^{g}
- Hylaeus dimidiatus (Perkins, 1899)^{i c g}
- Hylaeus dinkleri (Friese, 1898)^{i c g}
- Hylaeus diplonymus (Schulz, 1906)^{i c g}
- Hylaeus disjunctus (Cockerell, 1905)^{i c g}
- Hylaeus distractus (Cockerell, 1914)^{i c g}
- Hylaeus dolichocephalus Morawitz, 1876^{i c g}
- Hylaeus dominae Cockerell, 1936^{i c g}
- Hylaeus donbakeri Dathe, 1995^{i c g}
- Hylaeus dorni Dathe, 1986^{i c g}
- Hylaeus douglasi Michener, 1965^{i c g}
- Hylaeus dregei (Strand, 1912)^{i c g}
- Hylaeus dromedarius (Cockerell, 1910)^{i c g}
- Hylaeus dubiosus (Cresson, 1869)^{i c g}
- Hylaeus duckei (Alfken, 1904)^{i c g}
- Hylaeus dumetorum (Perkins, 1899)^{i c g}
- Hylaeus eardleyi Dathe, 2014^{g}
- Hylaeus ebmeri Dathe, 1980^{i c g}
- Hylaeus elatus (Warncke, 1981)^{i c g}
- Hylaeus elegans (Smith, 1853)^{i c}
- Hylaeus elongatus (Smith, 1879)^{i c g}
- Hylaeus emir Dathe, 2000^{i c g}
- Hylaeus episcopalis (Cockerell, 1896)^{i c g b}
- Hylaeus eugeniellus (Cockerell, 1910)^{i c g}
- Hylaeus euphorbiae Dathe, 2015^{g}
- Hylaeus eurygnathus Snelling, 1980^{i c g}
- Hylaeus euryscapus Förster, 1871^{i c g}
- Hylaeus euxanthus (Cockerell, 1910)^{i c g}
- Hylaeus excelsus (Alfken, 1931)^{i c g}
- Hylaeus exiguus (Schrottky, 1902)^{i c g}
- Hylaeus exleyae (Houston, 1975)^{i c g}
- Hylaeus expansus (Vachal, 1909)^{i c g}
- Hylaeus extensicornis Cockerell, 1936^{i c g}
- Hylaeus extensus (Cockerell, 1916)^{i c g}
- Hylaeus extrinsecus Snelling, 1982^{i c g}
- Hylaeus facilis (Smith, 1879)^{i c g}
- Hylaeus feai (Vachal, 1895)^{i c g}
- Hylaeus fedorica (Cockerell, 1909)^{i c g}
- Hylaeus fedtschenkoi Cockerell, 1906^{g}
- Hylaeus femoralis (Schrottky, 1902)^{i c g}
- Hylaeus fertoni (Vachal, 1891)^{i c g}
- Hylaeus fijiensis (Cockerell, 1909)^{i c g}
- Hylaeus filicum (Perkins, 1911)^{i c g}
- Hylaeus finitimus (Perkins, 1899)^{i c g}
- Hylaeus fissus (Vachal, 1901)^{i c g}
- Hylaeus flammipes (Robertson, 1893)^{i c g}
- Hylaeus flavifrons (W. F. Kirby, 1880)^{i c g}
- Hylaeus flavipes (Smith, 1853)^{i c g}
- Hylaeus flaviscutum (Alfken, 1914)^{i c g}
- Hylaeus flavohumeralis (Cockerell, 1918)^{i c g}
- Hylaeus flavojugatus (Cockerell, 1912)^{i c g}
- Hylaeus floralis (Smith, 1873)^{i c g}
- Hylaeus floridanus (Robertson, 1893)^{i c g}
- Hylaeus formosus Krombein, 1953^{i c g}
- Hylaeus fortis Cockerell, 1936^{i c g}
- Hylaeus fossifer Dathe, 1995^{i c g}
- Hylaeus foveatus (Rayment, 1950)^{i c g}
- Hylaeus fraternus (Bingham, 1898)^{i c g}
- Hylaeus frederici (Cockerell, 1905)^{i c}
- Hylaeus friesei (Alfken, 1904)^{i c g}
- Hylaeus frontalis Morawitz, 1876^{i c g}
- Hylaeus fuliginosus (Warncke, 1970)^{i c g}
- Hylaeus fumata (Strand, 1912)^{i c g}
- Hylaeus funereus (Warncke, 1992)^{i c g}
- Hylaeus fuscipennis (Smith, 1879)^{i c g}
- Hylaeus gabonicus (Vachal, 1899)^{i c g}
- Hylaeus gaigei (Cockerell, 1916)^{i c g}
- Hylaeus garrulus (Warncke, 1981)^{i c g}
- Hylaeus garzettus (Warncke, 1992)^{i c g}
- Hylaeus gaullei (Vachal, 1899)^{i c g}
- Hylaeus gazagnairei (Vachal, 1891)^{i c g}
- Hylaeus geminus (Vachal, 1910)^{i c g}
- Hylaeus genualis (Vachal, 1909)^{i c g}
- Hylaeus georgicus (Cockerell, 1898)^{i c g}
- Hylaeus gessianus Dathe, 2014^{g}
- Hylaeus gibbus Saunders, 1850^{i c g}
- Hylaeus gigas (Friese, 1911)^{i c g}
- Hylaeus glacialis Morawitz, 1872^{i c g}
- Hylaeus gliddenae Magnacca & Daly, 2003^{i c g}
- Hylaeus globula (Vachal, 1903)^{i c g}
- Hylaeus globuliferus (Cockerell, 1929)^{i c g}
- Hylaeus graafii Cockerell, 1936^{i c g}
- Hylaeus gracilicornis (Morawitz, 1867)^{i c g}
- Hylaeus gracillimus (Schrottky, 1902)^{i c g}
- Hylaeus graenicheri Mitchell, 1951^{i c g b}
- Hylaeus granulatus (Metz, 1911)^{i c g}
- Hylaeus greavesi (Rayment, 1935)^{i c g}
- Hylaeus gredleri Förster, 1871^{i c g}
- Hylaeus gressitti Hirashima, 1979^{i c g}
- Hylaeus gribodoi (Vachal, 1895)^{i c g}
- Hylaeus grossus (Cresson, 1869)^{i c g}
- Hylaeus gualanicus (Cockerell, 1912)^{i c g}
- Hylaeus guamensis (Cockerell, 1914)^{i c g}
- Hylaeus guaraniticus (Schrottky, 1906)^{i c g}
- Hylaeus gujaraticus (Nurse, 1903)^{i c g}
- Hylaeus haematopodus (Cockerell, 1913)^{i c g}
- Hylaeus haemorrhous (Benoist, 1946)^{i c g}
- Hylaeus haladanius Dathe, 2015^{g}
- Hylaeus haleakalae (Perkins, 1899)^{i c g}
- Hylaeus halictiformis (Perkins, 1912)^{i c g}
- Hylaeus hameri Dathe, 1995^{i c g}
- Hylaeus haygoodi Bridwell, 1919^{i c g}
- Hylaeus heliacus (Warncke, 1992)^{i c g}
- Hylaeus hellenicus Dathe, 2000^{i c g}
- Hylaeus hemirhodus Michener, 1965^{i c g}
- Hylaeus heraldicus (Smith, 1853)^{i c g}
- Hylaeus heteroclitus Hirashima, 1967^{i c g}
- Hylaeus hilaris (Smith, 1879)^{i c g}
- Hylaeus hirashimai Ikudome, 1989^{i c g}
- Hylaeus hirsutulus (Perkins, 1899)^{i c g}
- Hylaeus hirticaudus Cockerell, 1939^{i c g}
- Hylaeus hobartiellus Cockerell, 1929^{i c g}
- Hylaeus hohmanni Dathe, 1993^{i c g}
- Hylaeus honestus (Smith, 1879)^{i c g}
- Hylaeus hostilis (Perkins, 1899)^{i c g}
- Hylaeus hula (Perkins, 1911)^{i c g}
- Hylaeus hungaricus (Alfken, 1905)^{i c g}
- Hylaeus hurdi Snelling, 1966^{i c g}
- Hylaeus husela (Cockerell, 1910)^{i c g}
- Hylaeus hyalinatus Smith, 1842^{i c g b}
- Hylaeus hydrophilus (Schrottky, 1906)^{i c g}
- Hylaeus hyperpunctatus (Strand, 1909)^{i c g}
- Hylaeus hypoleucus (Cockerell, 1918)^{i c g}
- Hylaeus hyrcanius Dathe, 1980^{i c g}
- Hylaeus ibericus Dathe, 2000^{i c g}
- Hylaeus iheringi (Schrottky, 1910)^{i c g}
- Hylaeus ikedai (Yasumatsu, 1936)^{i c g}
- Hylaeus illinoisensis (Robertson, 1896)^{i c g}
- Hylaeus immarginatus (Alfken, 1914)^{i c g}
- Hylaeus imparilis Förster, 1871^{i c g}
- Hylaeus implicatus Dathe, 1980^{i c g}
- Hylaeus impressiventris (Benoist, 1960)^{i c g}
- Hylaeus incomitatus Snelling, 1970^{i c g}
- Hylaeus incongruus Förster, 1871^{g}
- Hylaeus indecisus Cockerell, 1929^{i c g}
- Hylaeus indistinctus Morawitz, 1890^{i c g}
- Hylaeus infans (Cockerell, 1910)^{i c g}
- Hylaeus infulatus Snelling, 1985^{i c g}
- Hylaeus innocens (Cameron, 1898)^{i c g}
- Hylaeus inquilina (Perkins, 1899)^{i c g}
- Hylaeus insolitus Snelling, 1966^{i c g}
- Hylaeus insularum Yasumatsu & Hirashima, 1965^{i c g}
- Hylaeus iranicus Dathe, 1980^{i c g}
- Hylaeus iridipennis (Schrottky, 1906)^{i c g}
- Hylaeus irritans Dathe, 1980^{i c g}
- Hylaeus isochromus Cockerell, 1936^{i c g}
- Hylaeus itapuensis (Schrottky, 1906)^{i c g}
- Hylaeus izikosalis Dathe, 2014^{g}
- Hylaeus jacksoniae Houston, 1981^{i c g}
- Hylaeus jacobsoni (Friese, 1914)^{i c g}
- Hylaeus jantaris Dathe, 1980^{i c g}
- Hylaeus jirisanensis Chen & Xu^{g}
- Hylaeus joergenseni (Schrottky, 1906)^{i c g}
- Hylaeus kahri Förster, 1871^{i c g}
- Hylaeus kashmirensis (Nurse, 1903)^{i c g}
- Hylaeus kasindensis Cockerell, 1936^{i c g}
- Hylaeus kaszabi Dathe, 1986^{i c g}
- Hylaeus kauaiensis (Perkins, 1899)^{i c g}
- Hylaeus kelvini (Cockerell, 1912)^{i c g}
- Hylaeus kermadecensis Donovan, 2007^{i c g}
- Hylaeus knabi (Cockerell, 1918)^{i c g}
- Hylaeus koenigsmanni Dathe, 1981^{i c g}
- Hylaeus kokeensis Magnacca & Daly, 2003^{i c g}
- Hylaeus kona (Blackburn, 1886)^{i c g}
- Hylaeus koreaensis Chen & Xu^{g}
- Hylaeus kotschisus (Warncke, 1981)^{i c g}
- Hylaeus kozlovi Dathe & Proshchalykin^{g}
- Hylaeus krebsianus (Strand, 1912)^{i c g}
- Hylaeus krombeini Snelling, 1980^{i c g}
- Hylaeus kuakea Magnacca & Daly, 2003^{i c g}
- Hylaeus kukui Magnacca & Daly, 2003^{i c g}
- Hylaeus kurdus (Warncke, 1981)^{i c g}
- Hylaeus labiatifrons (Cockerell, 1896)^{i c g}
- Hylaeus lactiferus (Cockerell, 1910)^{i c g}
- Hylaeus lactipennis (Benoist, 1957)^{i c g}
- Hylaeus laetus (Perkins, 1899)^{i c g}
- Hylaeus larocai Moure, 1972^{i c g}
- Hylaeus lateralis (Smith, 1879)^{i c g}
- Hylaeus leai (Cockerell, 1912)^{i c g}
- Hylaeus lemuriae (Benoist, 1945)^{i c g}
- Hylaeus lepidulus Cockerell, 1924^{i c g}
- Hylaeus leptocephalus (Morawitz, 1870)^{i c g b}
- Hylaeus leptospermi (Cockerell, 1922)^{i c g}
- Hylaeus leucolippa (Friese, 1913)^{i c g}
- Hylaeus leviceps (Houston, 1975)^{i c g}
- Hylaeus libericus (Cockerell, 1936)^{i c g}
- Hylaeus lightfooti Bridwell, 1919^{i c g}
- Hylaeus limbifrons (Cresson, 1869)^{i c g}
- Hylaeus lineaticeps (Friese, 1913)^{i c g}
- Hylaeus lineolatus (Schenck, 1861)^{i c g}
- Hylaeus liogonius (Vachal, 1899)^{i c g}
- Hylaeus littleri (Cockerell, 1918)^{i c}
- Hylaeus livius (Warncke, 1992)^{i c g}
- Hylaeus longiceps (Perkins, 1899)^{i c g}
- Hylaeus longimaculus (Alfken, 1936)^{i c g}
- Hylaeus longulus (Pérez, 1903)^{i c g}
- Hylaeus lubbocki (Cockerell, 1905)^{i c g}
- Hylaeus luctuosus (Benoist, 1944)^{i c g}
- Hylaeus lumbellus (Vachal, 1910)^{i c g}
- Hylaeus lunicraterius Snelling, 1970^{i c g}
- Hylaeus luteobalteatus (Dours, 1872)^{i c g}
- Hylaeus luzonicus (Cockerell, 1914)^{i c g}
- Hylaeus lychnis (Vachal, 1910)^{i c g}
- Hylaeus macilentus Ikudome, 1989^{i c g}
- Hylaeus maculatus (Alfken, 1904)^{i c g}
- Hylaeus maculipennis (Smith, 1879)^{i c g}
- Hylaeus maculipes (Cockerell, 1936)^{i c g}
- Hylaeus maculosus (Friese, 1921)^{i c g}
- Hylaeus maderensis (Cockerell, 1921)^{g}
- Hylaeus magnificus Cockerell, 1942^{i c g}
- Hylaeus magrettii (Vachal, 1892)^{i c g}
- Hylaeus mahafaly Hensen, 1987^{i c g}
- Hylaeus maiellus Rayment, 1935^{i c g}
- Hylaeus major (Strand, 1912)^{i c g}
- Hylaeus makaha ^{g}
- Hylaeus malagassus (Benoist, 1945)^{i c g}
- Hylaeus mana Magnacca & Daly, 2003^{i c g}
- Hylaeus mapirensis (Schrottky, 1910)^{i c g}
- Hylaeus margaretae Hirashima & Tadauchi, 1984^{i c g}
- Hylaeus maritimus Bridwell, 1910^{i c g}
- Hylaeus matamoko Donovan, 2007^{i c g}
- Hylaeus matsumurai Bridwell, 1919^{i c g}
- Hylaeus mauiensis (Perkins, 1899)^{i c g}
- Hylaeus maximilianus Dathe, 2006^{i c g}
- Hylaeus medialis Morawitz, 1890^{i c g}
- Hylaeus mediolucens Cockerell, 1911^{g}
- Hylaeus mediovirens (Cockerell, 1913)^{i c g}
- Hylaeus megalotis (Swenk & Cockerell, 1910)^{i c g}
- Hylaeus melaleucae Rayment, 1953^{i c g}
- Hylaeus melanocephalus (Cockerell, 1922)^{i c g}
- Hylaeus melanosoma (Cockerell, 1920)^{i c g}
- Hylaeus melanothrix (Perkins, 1899)^{i c g}
- Hylaeus melba (Warncke, 1992)^{i c g}
- Hylaeus mellon Dathe & Proshchalykin^{g}
- Hylaeus meridianus Yasumatsu & Hirashima, 1965^{i c g}
- Hylaeus meridionalis Förster, 1871^{i c g}
- Hylaeus meriti Rayment, 1935^{i c g}
- Hylaeus mesillae (Cockerell, 1896)^{i c g b}
- Hylaeus mexicanus (Cresson, 1869)^{i c}
- Hylaeus microphenax (Cockerell, 1910)^{i c g}
- Hylaeus microstictus Cockerell, 1942^{i c g}
- Hylaeus mimicus Magnacca & Daly, 2003^{i c g}
- Hylaeus mindanensis (Cockerell, 1915)^{i c g}
- Hylaeus minusculus (Cockerell, 1913)^{i c g}
- Hylaeus mirandus (Rayment, 1930)^{i c g}
- Hylaeus modestus Say, 1837^{i c g b}
- Hylaeus monedulus (Warncke, 1992)^{i c g}
- Hylaeus mongolicus Morawitz, 1890^{i c g}
- Hylaeus monilicornis Motschulski, 1863^{i c g}
- Hylaeus monostictus Cockerell, 1924^{i c g}
- Hylaeus montacuti (Cockerell, 1942)^{i c g}
- Hylaeus montanus (Nurse, 1903)^{i c g}
- Hylaeus monticola Bridwell, 1919^{i c g}
- Hylaeus montivagus Dathe, 1986^{i c g}
- Hylaeus moricei (Friese, 1898)^{i c g}
- Hylaeus multigibbosus Michener, 1965^{i c g}
- Hylaeus munageus Ikudome, 2004^{i c g}
- Hylaeus muranus (Warncke, 1970)^{i c g}
- Hylaeus murihiku Donovan, 2007^{i c g}
- Hylaeus murrayensis Rayment, 1935^{i c g}
- Hylaeus murrumbidgeanus Houston, 1981^{i c g}
- Hylaeus musgravei Cockerell, 1929^{i c g}
- Hylaeus mustelus (Vachal, 1894)^{i c g}
- Hylaeus mutatus (Perkins, 1899)^{i c g}
- Hylaeus nalo Magnacca & Daly, 2003^{i c g}
- Hylaeus namaquensis Cockerell, 1942^{i c g}
- Hylaeus nanseiensis Ikudome, 1989^{i c g}
- Hylaeus nasalis Morawitz, 1876^{i c g}
- Hylaeus nasutus (Vachal, 1910)^{i c g}
- Hylaeus neavei Cockerell, 1942^{i c g}
- Hylaeus nelumbonis (Robertson, 1890)^{i c g}
- Hylaeus nesoprosopoides Bridwell, 1919^{i c g}
- Hylaeus nevadensis (Cockerell, 1896)^{i c g}
- Hylaeus niger Bridwell, 1919^{i c g}
- Hylaeus nigrescens (Cockerell, 1918)^{i c g}
- Hylaeus nigricallosus Morawitz, 1890^{i c g}
- Hylaeus nigricans (Friese, 1913)^{i c g}
- Hylaeus nigriconcavus (Houston, 1975)^{i c g}
- Hylaeus nigripennis (Vachal, 1909)^{i c g}
- Hylaeus nigritus (Fabricius, 1798)^{i c g}
- Hylaeus niloticus (Warncke, 1970)^{i c g}
- Hylaeus nimbatus Dathe, 1986^{i c g}
- Hylaeus nippon Hirashima, 1977^{i c g}
- Hylaeus nivaliformis Dathe, 1977^{i c g}
- Hylaeus nivalis (Morawitz, 1867)^{i c g}
- Hylaeus niveofasciatus (Dours, 1872)^{i c g}
- Hylaeus nivicola Meade-Waldo, 1923^{i c g}
- Hylaeus noomen Hirashima, 1977^{i c g}
- Hylaeus nottoni Dathe, 2014^{g}
- Hylaeus nubilosus (Smith, 1853)^{i c g}
- Hylaeus nunenmacheri Bridwell, 1919^{i c g}
- Hylaeus nyassanus (Strand, 1912)^{i c g}
- Hylaeus nyrocus (Warncke, 1992)^{i c g}
- Hylaeus oblitus (Warncke, 1970)^{i c g}
- Hylaeus obtusatus (Smith, 1879)^{i c g}
- Hylaeus odontophora Strand, 1914^{g}
- Hylaeus oehlkei Dathe, 2010^{g}
- Hylaeus oenanthe (Warncke, 1992)^{i c g}
- Hylaeus ofarrelli Michener, 1965^{i c g}
- Hylaeus ogilviei Cockerell, 1936^{i c g}
- Hylaeus omanicus Dathe, 1995^{i c g}
- Hylaeus ombrias (Perkins, 1910)^{i c g}
- Hylaeus opacissimus (Cockerell, 1919)^{i c g}
- Hylaeus opaciventris (Friese, 1925)^{i c g}
- Hylaeus orbicus (Vachal, 1910)^{i c g}
- Hylaeus oresbius Snelling, 1980^{i c g}
- Hylaeus orientalicus (Warncke, 1981)^{i c g}
- Hylaeus ornatus Mitchell, 1951^{i c g b}
- Hylaeus oromialis Dathe, 2014^{g}
- Hylaeus palavanicus (Cockerell, 1915)^{i c g}
- Hylaeus pallidicornis Morawitz, 1876^{i c g}
- Hylaeus palmaris (Vachal, 1901)^{i c g}
- Hylaeus pamelae Dathe, 2014^{g}
- Hylaeus panamensis Michener, 1954^{i c g b}
- Hylaeus pannosus (Vachal, 1909)^{i c g}
- Hylaeus pannuceus Snelling, 1980^{i c g}
- Hylaeus papuanus (Hirashima & Roberts, 1986)^{i c g}
- Hylaeus paradifformis Ikudome, 1989^{i c g}
- Hylaeus paradisicola Hirashima & Tadauchi, 1984^{i c g}
- Hylaeus paradoxicus (Perkins, 1899)^{i c g}
- Hylaeus paradoxus (Schrottky, 1907)^{i c g}
- Hylaeus paraguayensis (Schrottky, 1906)^{i c g}
- Hylaeus parmatus Snelling, 1980^{i c g}
- Hylaeus paulistanus (Schrottky, 1906)^{i c g}
- Hylaeus paulus Bridwell, 1919^{i c g}
- Hylaeus paulyi Dathe, 2014^{g}
- Hylaeus paumako (Magnacca, 2025)
- Hylaeus pectoralis Förster, 1871^{i c g}
- Hylaeus pele (Perkins, 1911)^{i c g}
- Hylaeus peltates Snelling, 1980^{i c g}
- Hylaeus penalaris Dathe, 1979^{i c g}
- Hylaeus penangensis (Cockerell, 1920)^{i c g}
- Hylaeus perater Cockerell, 1936^{i c g}
- Hylaeus perdensus Cockerell, 1936^{i c g}
- Hylaeus peregrinus Dathe, 1986^{i c g}
- Hylaeus perforatus (Smith, 1873)^{i c g}
- Hylaeus pergibbosus Cockerell, 1926^{i c g}
- Hylaeus perhumilis (Cockerell, 1914)^{i c g}
- Hylaeus peringueyi (Bridwell, 1919)^{i c g}
- Hylaeus perkinsianus (Timberlake, 1926)^{i c g}
- Hylaeus perpictus Rayment, 1935^{i c g}
- Hylaeus perplexus (Smith, 1854)^{i c}
- Hylaeus perrufus Cockerell, 1929^{i c g}
- Hylaeus personatellus (Cockerell, 1915)^{i c g}
- Hylaeus perspicuus (Perkins, 1899)^{i c g}
- Hylaeus peruvianus (Schrottky, 1910)^{i c g}
- Hylaeus pesenkoi Proshchalykin & Dathe, 2016^{g}
- Hylaeus petroselini (Schrottky, 1906)^{i c g}
- Hylaeus pfankuchi (Alfken, 1919)^{i c g}
- Hylaeus phaeoscapus Snelling, 1982^{i c g}
- Hylaeus philoleucus (Cockerell, 1910)^{i c g}
- Hylaeus pictipes Nylander, 1852^{i c g}
- Hylaeus pictulus Michener, 1965^{i c g}
- Hylaeus pictus (Smith, 1853)^{i c g}
- Hylaeus pilosulus (Pérez, 1903)^{i c g}
- Hylaeus pirus Dathe, 1986^{i c g}
- Hylaeus polifolii (Cockerell, 1901)^{i c g b}
- Hylaeus polybiaeformis (Schrottky, 1907)^{i c g}
- Hylaeus polybioides (Schrottky, 1906)^{i c g}
- Hylaeus pomarinus (Warncke, 1992)^{i c g}
- Hylaeus porcatus Snelling, 1980^{i c g}
- Hylaeus potaninii Morawitz, 1890^{i c g}
- Hylaeus praenotatus Förster, 1871^{i c g}
- Hylaeus preposterosus Snelling, 1982^{i c g}
- Hylaeus primulipictus (Cockerell, 1905)^{i c g}
- Hylaeus probligenatus Houston, 1981^{i c g}
- Hylaeus procurvus (Rayment, 1939)^{i c g}
- Hylaeus promontorii Meade-Waldo, 1923^{i c g}
- Hylaeus proteae Cockerell, 1942^{i c g}
- Hylaeus proximus (Smith, 1879)^{i c g}
- Hylaeus przewalskyi Morawitz, 1886^{i c g}
- Hylaeus psaenythioides Snelling, 1985^{i c g}
- Hylaeus psammobius (Perkins, 1911)^{i c g}
- Hylaeus psammophilus (Schrottky, 1906)^{i c g}
- Hylaeus pubescens (Perkins, 1899)^{i c g}
- Hylaeus puerulus (Vachal, 1910)^{i c g}
- Hylaeus pumilus Dathe, 2015^{g}
- Hylaeus punctatus (Brullé, 1832)^{i c g b}
- Hylaeus punctiferus Cockerell, 1936^{i c g}
- Hylaeus punctulatissimus Smith, 1842^{i c g}
- Hylaeus punctus Förster, 1871^{i c g}
- Hylaeus pyrenaicus Dathe, 2000^{i c g}
- Hylaeus quadratifer (Cockerell, 1912)^{i c g}
- Hylaeus quadratus (Smith, 1853)^{i c g}
- Hylaeus quadriceps (Smith, 1879)^{i c g}
- Hylaeus quadricornis (Hedicke, 1926)^{i c g}
- Hylaeus quartinae (Gribodo, 1894)^{i c g}
- Hylaeus rawi Snelling, 1982^{i c g}
- Hylaeus recisus (Vachal, 1910)^{i c g}
- Hylaeus reditus Cockerell, 1936^{i c g}
- Hylaeus relegatus (Smith, 1876)^{i c g}
- Hylaeus repentens (Nurse, 1903)^{i c g}
- Hylaeus rhodesicus (Cockerell, 1942)^{i c g}
- Hylaeus rhodognathus Cockerell, 1936^{i c g}
- Hylaeus riekianus Houston, 1981^{i c g}
- Hylaeus rinki (Gorski, 1852)^{i c g}
- Hylaeus rivalis (Schrottky, 1906)^{i c g}
- Hylaeus robertianus (Cameron, 1906)^{i c g}
- Hylaeus rotensis (Yasumatsu, 1939)^{i c g}
- Hylaeus rotundiceps (Smith, 1879)^{i c g}
- Hylaeus royesi Raw, 1984^{i c g}
- Hylaeus rubicola Saunders, 1850^{i c g}
- Hylaeus rubrifacialis (Strand, 1912)^{i c g}
- Hylaeus rubroplagiatus (Cameron, 1905)^{i c g}
- Hylaeus rudbeckiae (Cockerell & Casad, 1895)^{i c g}
- Hylaeus ruficeps (Smith, 1853)^{i c g}
- Hylaeus rufipedoides (Strand, 1911)^{i c g}
- Hylaeus rufipes (Smith, 1853)^{i c}
- Hylaeus rufipictus (Strand, 1912)^{i c g}
- Hylaeus rufoclypeatus (Friese, 1917)^{i c g}
- Hylaeus rufulus (Friese, 1908)^{i c g}
- Hylaeus rugicollis Morawitz, 1873^{i c g}
- Hylaeus rugipunctus (Alfken, 1914)^{i c g}
- Hylaeus rugosus (Smith, 1879)^{i c g}
- Hylaeus rugulosus (Perkins, 1899)^{i c g}
- Hylaeus saltensis (Friese, 1908)^{i c g}
- Hylaeus sanctus Cockerell, 1936^{i c g}
- Hylaeus sandacanensis (Cockerell, 1919)^{i c g}
- Hylaeus sanguinipictus (Cockerell, 1914)^{i c g}
- Hylaeus saniculae (Robertson, 1896)^{i c g}
- Hylaeus sansibaribius (Strand, 1912)^{i c g}
- Hylaeus sariensis Dathe, 1980^{i c g}
- Hylaeus satelles (Blackburn, 1886)^{i c g}
- Hylaeus schwarzii (Cockerell, 1896)^{i c g b}
- Hylaeus scintillans (Cockerell, 1922)^{i c g}
- Hylaeus scintilliformis (Cockerell, 1913)^{i c g}
- Hylaeus scintillus (Cockerell, 1912)^{i c g}
- Hylaeus scrobicauda (Vachal, 1901)^{i c g}
- Hylaeus scrupeus (Vachal, 1909)^{i c g}
- Hylaeus sculptilis (Schrottky, 1910)^{i c g}
- Hylaeus sculptus (Cockerell, 1911)^{i c g}
- Hylaeus scutaticornis Michener, 1965^{i c g}
- Hylaeus scutellaris Morawitz, 1873^{i c g}
- Hylaeus scutellatus (Spinola, 1838)^{i c g}
- Hylaeus scutispinus (Alfken, 1914)^{i c g}
- Hylaeus scutulus (Vachal, 1894)^{i c g}
- Hylaeus seabrai Urban & Moure, 2002^{i c g}
- Hylaeus seclusus Cockerell & Sumner, 1931^{i c g}
- Hylaeus secretus (Nurse, 1903)^{i c g}
- Hylaeus sedens Snelling, 1980^{i c g}
- Hylaeus sejunctus Snelling, 1970^{i c g}
- Hylaeus semicastaneus (Cockerell, 1918)^{i c g}
- Hylaeus semipersonatus Cockerell, 1929^{i c g}
- Hylaeus semirufus (Cockerell, 1914)^{i c g}
- Hylaeus serotinellus (Cockerell, 1906)^{i c g}
- Hylaeus setosifrons (Perkins, 1899)^{i c g}
- Hylaeus sibiricus (Strand, 1909)^{i c g}
- Hylaeus sidensis (Warncke, 1981)^{i c g}
- Hylaeus signatus (Panzer, 1798)^{i c g}
- Hylaeus simplex (Perkins, 1899)^{i c g}
- Hylaeus simplior Meade-Waldo, 1923^{i c g}
- Hylaeus simplus Houston, 1993^{i c g}
- Hylaeus simpsoni Cockerell, 1942^{i c g}
- Hylaeus simulans Cockerell, 1942^{i c g}
- Hylaeus simus (Vachal, 1895)^{i c g}
- Hylaeus sinensis Dathe, 2005^{i c g}
- Hylaeus sinuatus (Schenck, 1853)^{i c g}
- Hylaeus solaris Magnacca & Daly, 2003^{i c g}
- Hylaeus sonorensis Cockerell, 1924^{i c g}
- Hylaeus soror (Pérez, 1903)^{i c g}
- Hylaeus sparsus (Cresson, 1869)^{i c g}
- Hylaeus specularis (Perkins, 1899)^{i c g}
- Hylaeus sphecodoides (Perkins, 1899)^{i c g}
- Hylaeus spilotus Förster, 1871^{i c g}
- Hylaeus stenops (Schrottky, 1910)^{i c g}
- Hylaeus stentoriscapus Dathe, 1986^{i c g}
- Hylaeus stictifrons (Cockerell, 1936)^{i c g}
- Hylaeus stilbaspis (Vachal, 1901)^{i c g}
- Hylaeus strenuus (Cameron, 1897)^{i c g}
- Hylaeus stubbei Dathe, 1986^{i c g}
- Hylaeus styriacus Förster, 1871^{i c g}
- Hylaeus subbutea (Warncke, 1992)^{i c g}
- Hylaeus subconstrictus (Cockerell, 1922)^{i c g}
- Hylaeus subcoronatus Rayment, 1935^{i c g}
- Hylaeus subfortis (Cockerell, 1942)^{i c g}
- Hylaeus subgriseus (Cockerell, 1918)^{i c g}
- Hylaeus sublateralis (Cockerell, 1914)^{i c g}
- Hylaeus sublucens Cockerell, 1936^{i c g}
- Hylaeus submonticola Ikudome, 1989^{i c g}
- Hylaeus subplebeius (Cockerell, 1905)^{i c g}
- Hylaeus subreditus Cockerell, 1942^{i c g}
- Hylaeus suffusus (Cockerell, 1896)^{i c g}
- Hylaeus sulphuripes (Gribodo, 1894)^{i c g}
- Hylaeus taclobanus (Cockerell, 1915)^{i c g}
- Hylaeus taeniolatus Förster, 1871^{i c g}
- Hylaeus tagala (Ashmead, 1905)^{i c g}
- Hylaeus taihorinica Strand, 1914^{g}
- Hylaeus takumiae Magnacca & Daly, 2003^{i c g}
- Hylaeus tardus (Warncke, 1981)^{i c g}
- Hylaeus telmenicus Dathe, 1986^{i c g}
- Hylaeus tenuis (Alfken, 1914)^{i c g}
- Hylaeus tephronotus (Warncke, 1992)^{i c g}
- Hylaeus teruelus (Warncke, 1981)^{i c g}
- Hylaeus tetris Dathe, 2000^{i c g}
- Hylaeus theodorei (Perkins, 1912)^{i c g}
- Hylaeus thyreus Snelling, 1980^{i c g}
- Hylaeus timberlakei Snelling, 1970^{i c g}
- Hylaeus tinctulus Cockerell, 1932^{i c g}
- Hylaeus titanius (Friese, 1925)^{i c g}
- Hylaeus torquatus (Warncke, 1992)^{i c g}
- Hylaeus transversicostata ^{g}
- Hylaeus transversus (Vachal, 1909)^{i c g}
- Hylaeus transvittatus (Cockerell, 1917)^{i c g}
- Hylaeus triangulum Fabricius, 1793^{i c g}
- Hylaeus tricolor (Schrottky, 1906)^{i c g}
- Hylaeus trifidus (Alfken, 1936)^{i c g}
- Hylaeus trilobatus (Cockerell, 1910)^{i c g}
- Hylaeus trimerops (Cockerell, 1916)^{i c g}
- Hylaeus trinotatus (Pérez, 1895)^{i c g}
- Hylaeus trisignatus Morawitz, 1876^{i c g}
- Hylaeus trisulcus (Vachal, 1910)^{i c g}
- Hylaeus trivittatus (Friese, 1917)^{i c g}
- Hylaeus tsingtauensis Strand, 1915^{g}
- Hylaeus tuamotuensis Michener, 1965^{i c g}
- Hylaeus tuertonis (Cockerell, 1906)^{i c g}
- Hylaeus turgicollaris Michener, 1965^{i c g}
- Hylaeus tyrolensis Förster, 1871^{i c g}
- Hylaeus ubertus (Vachal, 1910)^{i c g}
- Hylaeus uelleburgensis (Strand, 1912)^{i c g}
- Hylaeus ugandicus (Cockerell, 1939)^{i c g}
- Hylaeus ulanus Dathe, 1986^{i c g}
- Hylaeus ulaula ^{g}
- Hylaeus umtalicus (Cockerell, 1936)^{i c g}
- Hylaeus unicus (Perkins, 1899)^{i c g}
- Hylaeus vachali Meade-Waldo, 1923^{i c g}
- Hylaeus vachalianus Moure, 1960^{i c g}
- Hylaeus valinis Dathe, 1986^{i c g}
- Hylaeus varians Cockerell, 1936^{i c g}
- Hylaeus variegatus (Fabricius, 1798)^{i c g}
- Hylaeus variolosus (Smith, 1853)^{i c g}
- Hylaeus venustus Dathe, 2014^{g}
- Hylaeus versicolor Saunders, 1850^{i c g}
- Hylaeus verticalis (Cresson, 1869)^{i c g b}
- Hylaeus vetustus (Nurse, 1903)^{i c g}
- Hylaeus vigilans (Smith, 1879)^{i c}
- Hylaeus villosellus Moure, 1960^{i c g}
- Hylaeus violaceus (Smith, 1853)^{i c g}
- Hylaeus vittatifrons (Cockerell, 1913)^{i c g}
- Hylaeus volatilis (Smith, 1879)^{i c g}
- Hylaeus volcanicus (Perkins, 1899)^{i c g}
- Hylaeus volusiensis Mitchell, 1951^{i c g}
- Hylaeus vulgaris Morawitz, 1876^{i c g}
- Hylaeus williamsi (Bridwell, 1919)^{i c g}
- Hylaeus wilsoni (Rayment, 1928)^{i c g}
- Hylaeus wootoni (Cockerell, 1896)^{i c}
- Hylaeus worcesteri (Cockerell, 1919)^{i c g}
- Hylaeus woyensis Rayment, 1939^{i c g}
- Hylaeus wynyardensis Cockerell, 1929^{i c g}
- Hylaeus xanthaspis (Cockerell, 1910)^{i c g}
- Hylaeus xanthocephalus (Schrottky, 1906)^{i c g}
- Hylaeus xanthognathus Rayment, 1935^{i c g}
- Hylaeus xanthopoda (Vachal, 1895)^{i c g}
- Hylaeus xanthopsyche (Cockerell, 1922)^{i c g}
- Hylaeus xanthostoma (Alfken, 1914)^{i c g}
- Hylaeus yaguarae (Schrottky, 1913)^{i c g}
- Hylaeus yapensis (Yasumatsu, 1942)^{i c g}
- Hylaeus yasumatsui Snelling, 1970^{i c g}
- Hylaeus yoruba (Bridwell, 1919)^{i c g}
- Hylaeus zamoranicus (Cockerell, 1949)^{i c g}

Data sources: i = ITIS, c = Catalogue of Life, g = GBIF, b = Bugguide.net
