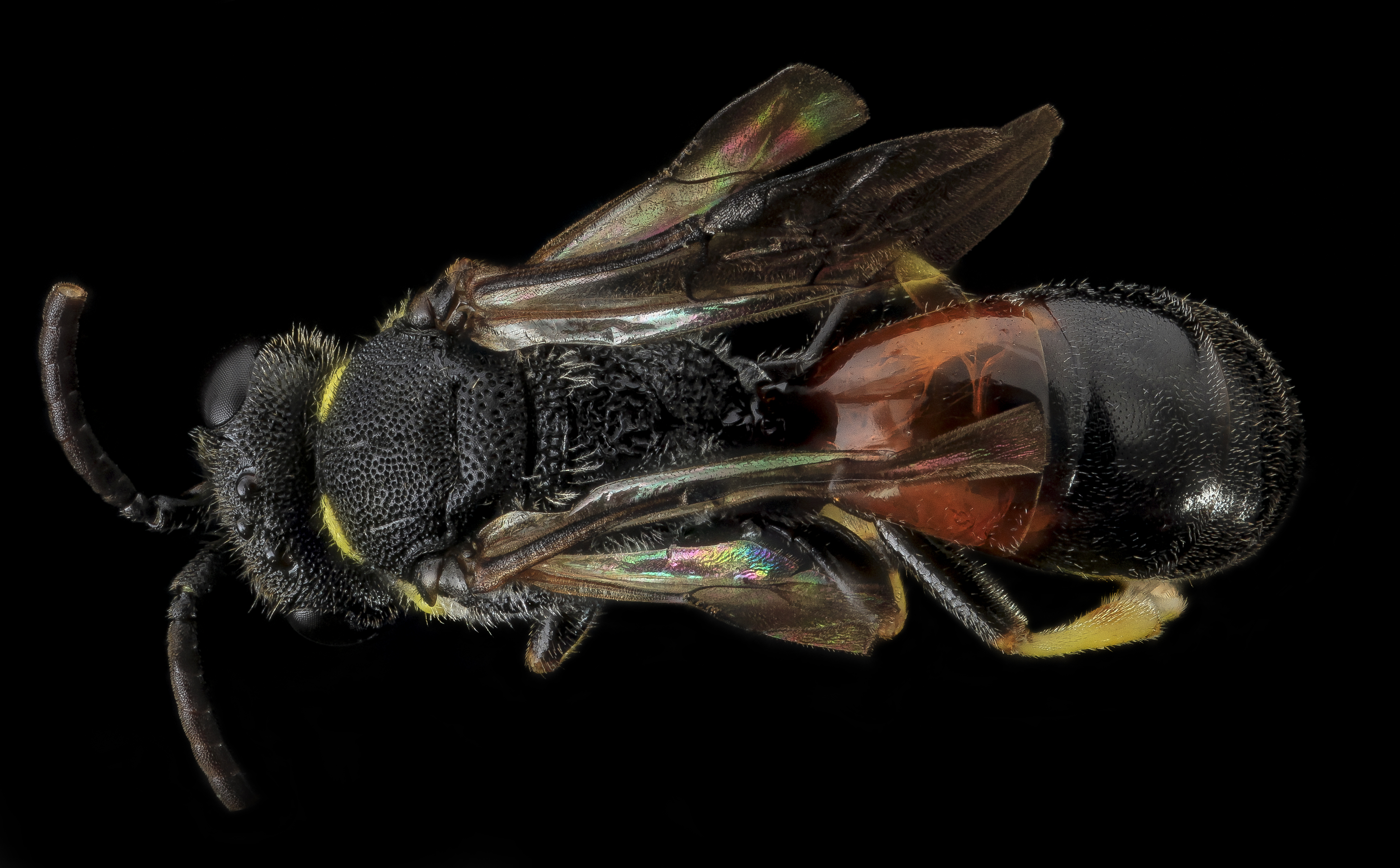

Scientific classification
- Kingdom: Animalia
- Phylum: Arthropoda
- Clade: Pancrustacea
- Class: Insecta
- Order: Hymenoptera
- Family: Colletidae
- Genus: Hylaeus
- Species: H. ornatus

Binomial name
- Hylaeus ornatus Mitchell, 1951

= Hylaeus ornatus =

Species of bee

Hylaeus ornatus is a species of hymenopteran in the family Colletidae. It is found in North America.

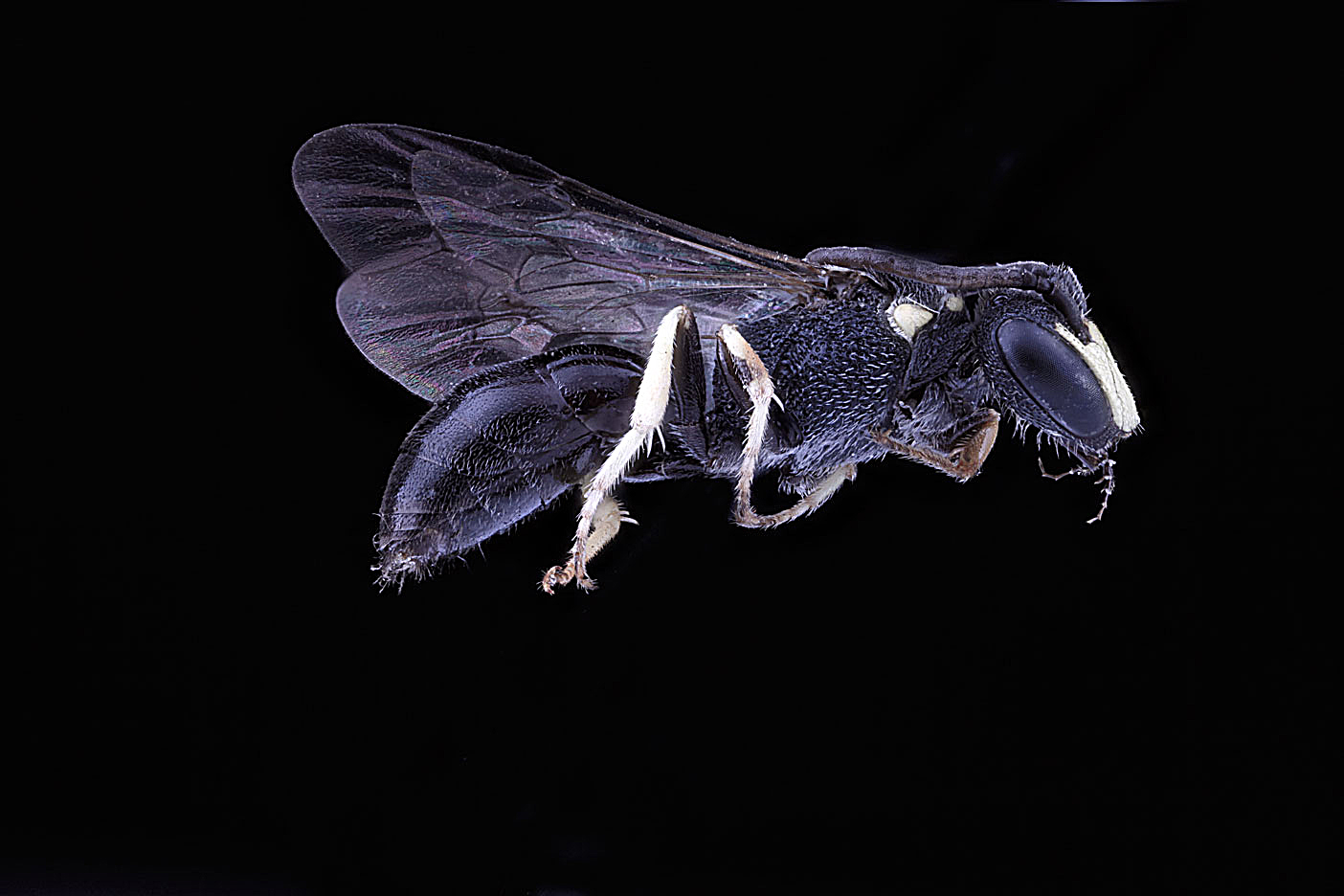
Ornate masked bee, Hylaeus ornatus
