= Hylaeus haematopodus =

Scientific classification
- Kingdom: Animalia
- Phylum: Arthropoda
- Clade: Pancrustacea
- Class: Insecta
- Order: Hymenoptera
- Family: Colletidae
- Genus: Hylaeus
- Species: H. haematopodus

Binomial name
- Hylaeus haematopodus (Cockerell, 1913)

Synonyms
- Prosopis haematopoda Cockerell, 1913

Species of bee

Hylaeus haematopodus, or Hylaeus (Rhodohylaeus) haematopodus, is a species of bee in the family Colletidae and subfamily Hylaeinae. It is endemic to Australia. It was described by British-American entomologist Theodore Dru Alison Cockerell in 1913.

== Description ==
Female body length is about 7 mm. Integumental colouration is mainly black and red, with orange markings.

== Distribution and habitat ==
The type locality is simply "South Australia", without further details.

== Behaviour ==
The adults are flying mellivores.
