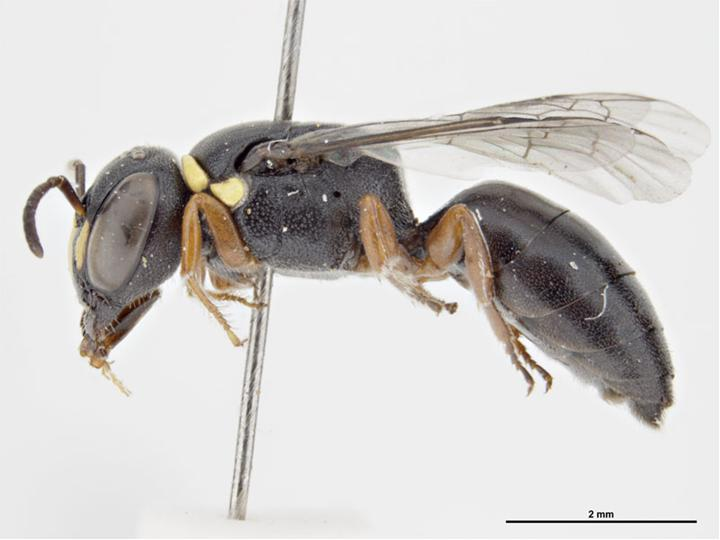
- Female

Scientific classification
- Kingdom: Animalia
- Phylum: Arthropoda
- Clade: Pancrustacea
- Class: Insecta
- Order: Hymenoptera
- Family: Colletidae
- Genus: Hylaeus
- Species: H. douglasi

Binomial name
- Hylaeus douglasi Michener, 1965

Synonyms
- Hylaeus (Prosopisteron) douglasi Michener, 1965

= Hylaeus douglasi =

Species of bee

Hylaeus douglasi, or Hylaeus (Hylaeteron) douglasi, is a species of bee in the family Colletidae and subfamily Hylaeinae. It is endemic to Australia. It was described by American entomologist Charles Duncan Michener in 1965.

== Etymology ==
The specific epithet douglasi honours Athol Douglas of the Western Australian Museum.

== Description ==
Male body length is 7 mm, wing length 5.5 mm. Integumental colouration is mainly black, with yellow markings.

== Distribution and habitat ==
The species occurs in Western Australia. The type locality is Morawa, in the Mid West region.

== Behaviour ==
The adults are flying mellivores. Flowering plants visited by the bees include Grevillea species.

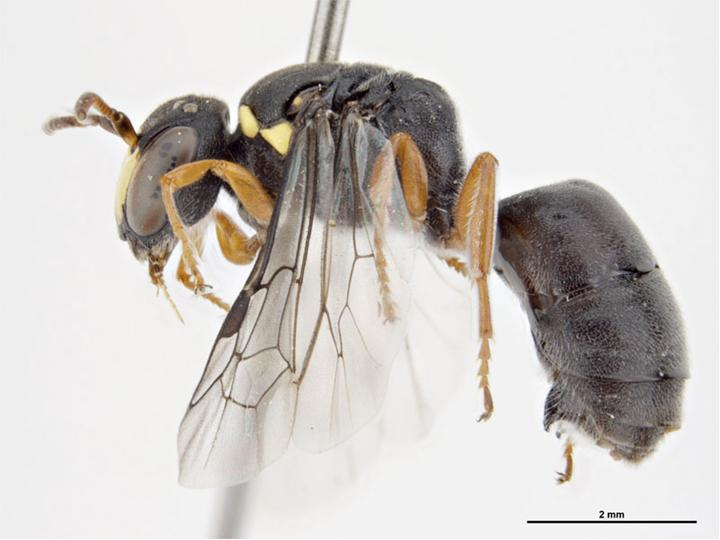
Male
