= Hylaeus colei =

Scientific classification
- Kingdom: Animalia
- Phylum: Arthropoda
- Clade: Pancrustacea
- Class: Insecta
- Order: Hymenoptera
- Family: Colletidae
- Genus: Hylaeus
- Species: H. colei

Binomial name
- Hylaeus colei Rayment, 1935

Synonyms
- Hylaeus lateralis colei Rayment, 1935

Species of bee

Hylaeus colei, or Hylaeus (Rhodohylaeus) colei, is a species of bee in the family Colletidae and subfamily Hylaeinae. It is endemic to Australia. It was described by Australian entomologist Tarlton Rayment in 1935.

== Description ==
Female body length is about 5 mm. Integumental colouration is mainly black and red, with yellow markings.

== Distribution and habitat ==
The species occurs in Victoria in south-eastern Australia. The type locality is Melbourne.

== Behaviour ==
The adults are flying mellivores.
