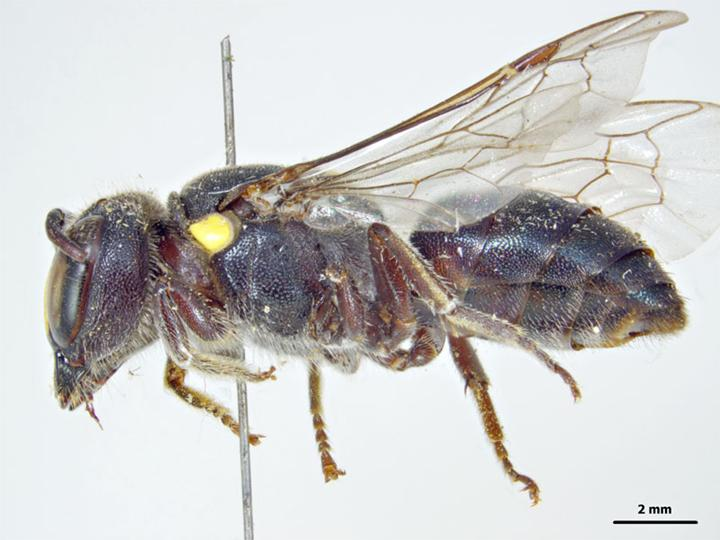
- Female

Scientific classification
- Kingdom: Animalia
- Phylum: Arthropoda
- Clade: Pancrustacea
- Class: Insecta
- Order: Hymenoptera
- Family: Colletidae
- Genus: Hylaeus
- Species: H. perplexus

Binomial name
- Hylaeus perplexus (Smith, 1854)

Synonyms
- Prosopis confusa Smith, 1853; Prosopis perplexa Smith, 1854; Prosopis metallicus Smith, 1862; Prosopis vicina Sichel, 1868; Prosopis major Friese, 1924

= Hylaeus perplexus =

Species of bee

Hylaeus perplexus, or Hylaeus (Euprosopoides) perplexus, is a species of bee in the family Colletidae and subfamily Hylaeinae. It is endemic to Australia. It was described by English entomologist Frederick Smith in 1853.

== Distribution and habitat ==
The species occurs in eastern Australia. Type localities include "New Holland" and Sydney.

== Behaviour ==
The adults are flying mellivores.

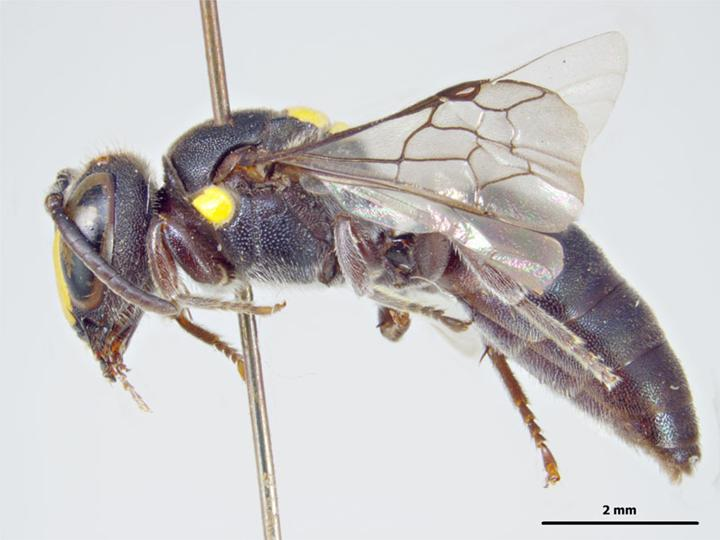
Male
