= Hylaeus procurvus =

Scientific classification
- Kingdom: Animalia
- Phylum: Arthropoda
- Clade: Pancrustacea
- Class: Insecta
- Order: Hymenoptera
- Family: Colletidae
- Genus: Hylaeus
- Species: H. procurvus

Binomial name
- Hylaeus procurvus (Rayment, 1939)

Synonyms
- Sphaerhylaeus procurvus Rayment, 1939

Species of bee

Hylaeus procurvus, or Hylaeus (Prosopisteron) procurvus, is a species of bee in the family Colletidae and subfamily Hylaeinae. It is endemic to Australia. It was described by Australian entomologist Tarlton Rayment in 1939.

== Description ==
Male body length is about 6 mm. Integumental colouration is mainly black, with yellow markings.

== Distribution and habitat ==
The species occurs in south-eastern Australia. The type locality is the Bogong High Plains, in the Victorian Alps, at an elevation of 6,000 ft (1,800 m).

== Behaviour ==
The adults are flying mellivores.
