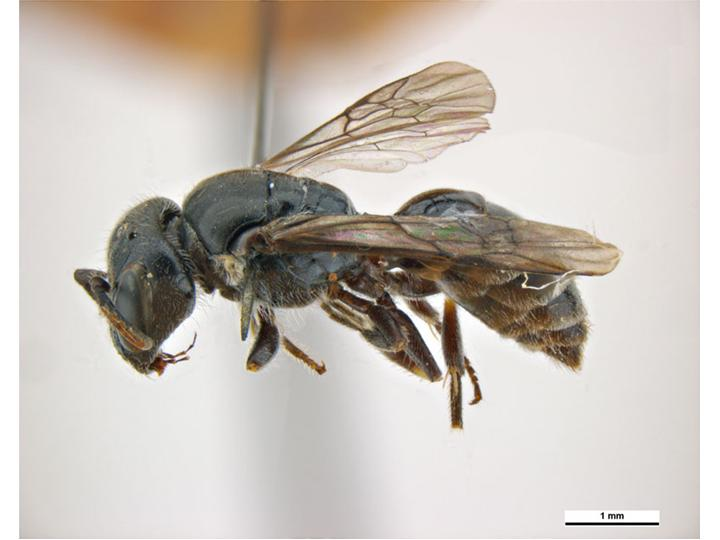
- Female

Scientific classification
- Kingdom: Animalia
- Phylum: Arthropoda
- Clade: Pancrustacea
- Class: Insecta
- Order: Hymenoptera
- Family: Colletidae
- Genus: Hylaeus
- Species: H. semipersonatus

Binomial name
- Hylaeus semipersonatus Cockerell, 1929

= Hylaeus semipersonatus =

Species of bee

Hylaeus semipersonatus, or Hylaeus (Prosopisteron) semipersonatus, is a species of bee in the family Colletidae and subfamily Hylaeinae. It is endemic to Australia. It was described by British-American entomologist Theodore Dru Alison Cockerell in 1929.

== Description ==
Male body length is about 4.5 mm. Integumental colouration is mainly black, with cream markings. According to Cockerell, it is: "A distinct little species, easily known by the partly masked face, with dark femora and mainly black mandibles."

== Distribution and habitat ==
The species occurs in Tasmania. The type locality is Cradle Mountain.

== Behaviour ==
The adults are flying mellivores.
