= Hylaeus scintilliformis =

Scientific classification
- Kingdom: Animalia
- Phylum: Arthropoda
- Clade: Pancrustacea
- Class: Insecta
- Order: Hymenoptera
- Family: Colletidae
- Genus: Hylaeus
- Species: H. scintilliformis

Binomial name
- Hylaeus scintilliformis (Cockerell, 1913)

Synonyms
- Prosopis scintilliformis Cockerell, 1913

Species of bee

Hylaeus scintilliformis, or Hylaeus (Prosopisteron) scintilliformis, is a species of bee in the family Colletidae and subfamily Hylaeinae. It is endemic to Australia. It was described by British-American entomologist Theodore Dru Alison Cockerell in 1913.

== Description ==
Female body length is about 4.5 mm. Integumental colouration is mainly black, with yellow markings.

== Distribution and habitat ==
The species occurs in south-eastern Australia. The type locality is Croydon, Victoria. It has also been recorded from Mount Yule, near Healesville.

== Behaviour ==
The adults are flying mellivores. Flowering plants visited by the bees include Eucalyptus species.
