= Hylaeus sedens =

Scientific classification
- Kingdom: Animalia
- Phylum: Arthropoda
- Clade: Pancrustacea
- Class: Insecta
- Order: Hymenoptera
- Family: Colletidae
- Genus: Hylaeus
- Species: H. sedens

Binomial name
- Hylaeus sedens Snelling, 1980

Species of bee

Hylaeus sedens is a bee species endemic to Asia.
