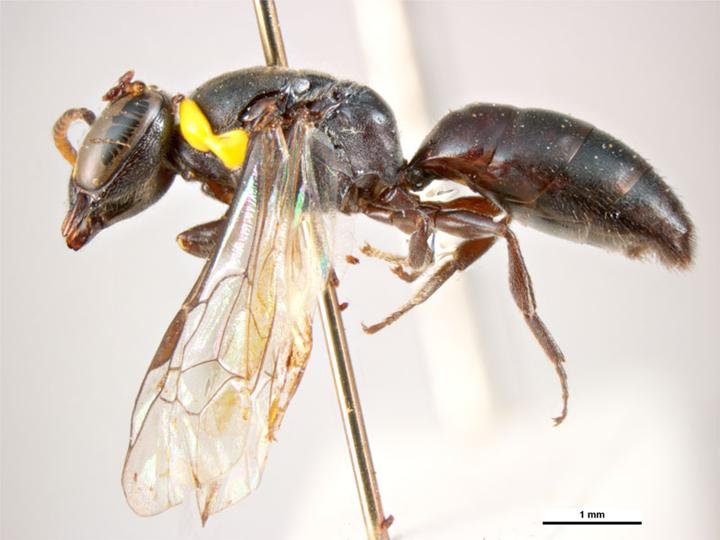
- Female

Scientific classification
- Kingdom: Animalia
- Phylum: Arthropoda
- Clade: Pancrustacea
- Class: Insecta
- Order: Hymenoptera
- Family: Colletidae
- Genus: Hylaeus
- Species: H. callosus

Binomial name
- Hylaeus callosus (Cockerell, 1910)

Synonyms
- Prosopis callosa Cockerell, 1910

= Hylaeus callosus =

Species of bee

Hylaeus callosus is a species of bee in the family Colletidae and subfamily Hylaeinae. It is endemic to Australia. It was described by British-American entomologist Theodore Dru Alison Cockerell in 1910.

== Description ==
Male body length is about 6 mm. Integumental colouration is mainly black, with yellow markings.

== Distribution and habitat ==
The species occurs in Victoria. The type locality is Port Phillip.

== Behaviour ==
The adults are flying mellivores.
