= Hylaeus anmelanocephalus =

Scientific classification
- Kingdom: Animalia
- Phylum: Arthropoda
- Clade: Pancrustacea
- Class: Insecta
- Order: Hymenoptera
- Family: Colletidae
- Genus: Hylaeus
- Species: H. anmelanocephalus

Binomial name
- Hylaeus anmelanocephalus Rayment, 1954

Species of bee

Hylaeus anmelanocephalus is a species of bee in the family Colletidae and subfamily Hylaeinae. It is endemic to Australia. It was described by Australian entomologist Tarlton Rayment in 1954.

== Description ==
Integumental colouration is mainly black, with a red abdomen.

== Distribution and habitat ==
The species occurs in eastern Australia. The type locality is Lane Cove, Sydney.

== Behaviour ==
The adults are solitary flying mellivores. They nest in galleries in wood, and have sedentary larvae.
