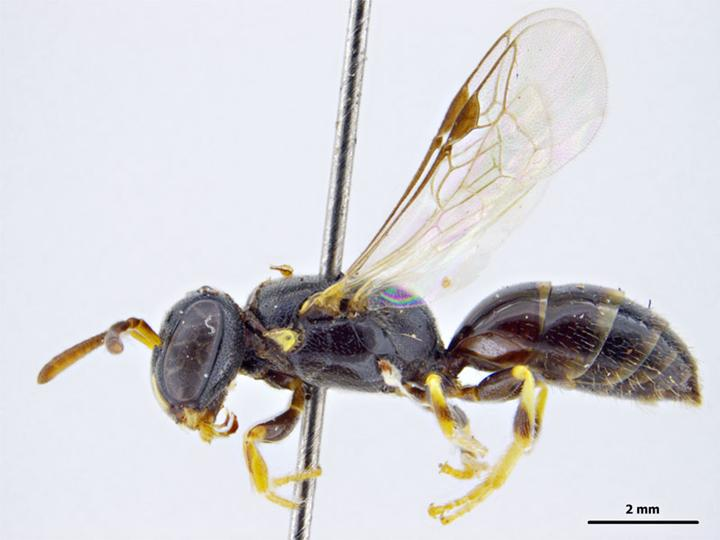
- Female

Scientific classification
- Kingdom: Animalia
- Phylum: Arthropoda
- Clade: Pancrustacea
- Class: Insecta
- Order: Hymenoptera
- Family: Colletidae
- Genus: Hylaeus
- Species: H. sculptus

Binomial name
- Hylaeus sculptus (Cockerell, 1911)

Synonyms
- Heterapis sculpta Cockerell, 1911

= Hylaeus sculptus =

Species of bee

Hylaeus sculptus, or Hylaeus (Gephyrohylaeus) sculptus, is a species of bee in the family Colletidae and subfamily Hylaeinae. It is endemic to Australia. It was described by British-American entomologist Theodore Dru Alison Cockerell in 1911.

== Description ==
Male body length is about 6 mm. Integumental colouration is mainly black, with yellow and ferruginous markings.

== Distribution and habitat ==
The species occurs in tropical north-eastern Australia. The type locality is Mackay, Queensland. It has also been recorded from Bamaga and Kuranda.

== Behaviour ==
The adults are flying mellivores.
