= Hylaeus liogonius =

Scientific classification
- Kingdom: Animalia
- Phylum: Arthropoda
- Clade: Pancrustacea
- Class: Insecta
- Order: Hymenoptera
- Family: Colletidae
- Genus: Hylaeus
- Species: H. liogonius

Binomial name
- Hylaeus liogonius (Vachal, 1899)

Synonyms
- Prosopis liogonia Vachal, 1899

Species of bee

Hylaeus liogonius is a species of bee in the family Colletidae and subfamily Hylaeinae. It is endemic to Australia. It was described by French entomologist Joseph Vachal in 1899.

== Distribution and habitat ==
The type locality is given simply as "Australia" with no further precision.

== Behaviour ==
The adults are flying mellivores.
