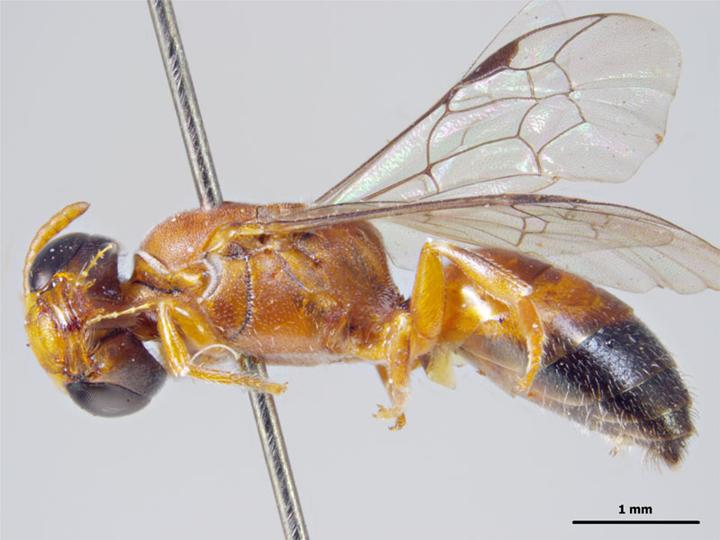
- Female

Scientific classification
- Kingdom: Animalia
- Phylum: Arthropoda
- Clade: Pancrustacea
- Class: Insecta
- Order: Hymenoptera
- Family: Colletidae
- Genus: Hylaeus
- Species: H. perrufus

Binomial name
- Hylaeus perrufus Cockerell, 1929

= Hylaeus perrufus =

Species of bee

Hylaeus perrufus, or Hylaeus (Rhodohylaeus) perrufus, is a species of bee in the family Colletidae and subfamily Hylaeinae. It is endemic to Australia. It was described by British-American entomologist Theodore Dru Alison Cockerell in 1929.

== Description ==
Female body length is about 5.6 mm. Integumental colouration is mainly black and red with orange markings.

== Distribution and habitat ==
The species occurs in eastern mainland Australia. The type locality is the Bunya Mountains of southern Queensland.

== Behaviour ==
The adults are flying mellivores.

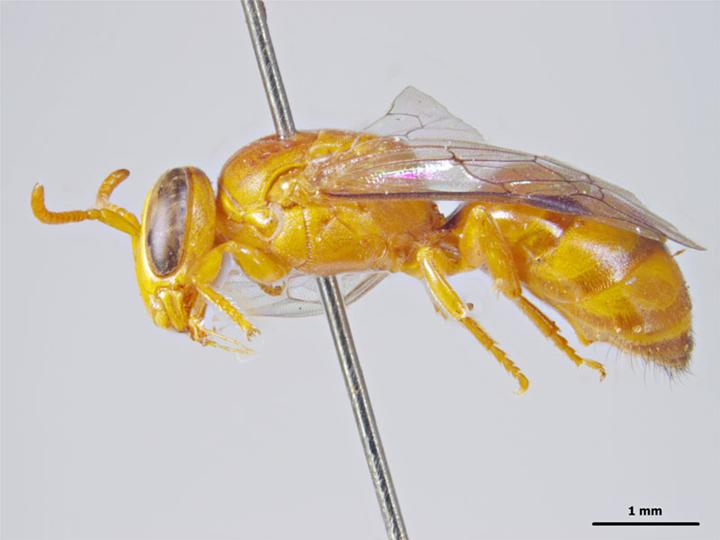
Male
