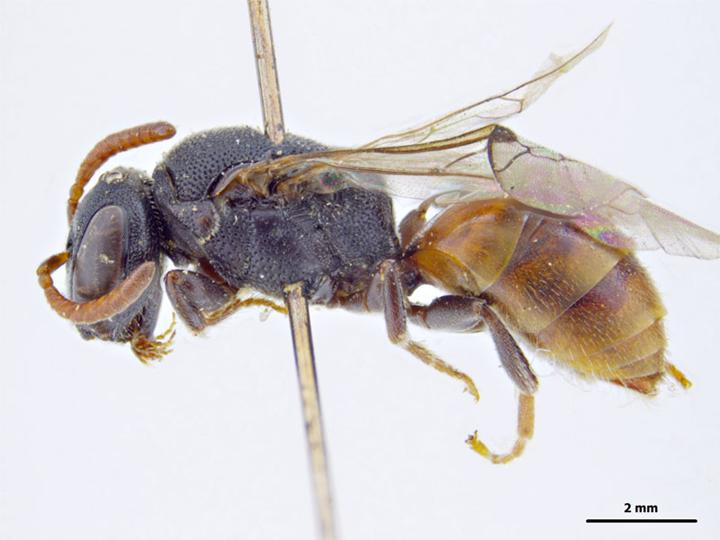
- Female

Scientific classification
- Kingdom: Animalia
- Phylum: Arthropoda
- Clade: Pancrustacea
- Class: Insecta
- Order: Hymenoptera
- Family: Colletidae
- Genus: Hylaeus
- Species: H. constrictiformis

Binomial name
- Hylaeus constrictiformis (Cockerell, 1910)

Synonyms
- Prosopis constrictiformis Cockerell, 1910

= Hylaeus constrictiformis =

Species of bee

Hylaeus constrictiformis, or Hylaeus (Rhodohylaeus) constrictiformis, is a species of bee in the family Colletidae and subfamily Hylaeinae. It is endemic to Australia. It was described by British-American entomologist Theodore Dru Alison Cockerell in 1910.

== Description ==
Male body length is about 4 mm.

== Distribution and habitat ==
The species occurs in tropical north-eastern Australia. The type locality is Cooktown, Queensland.

== Behaviour ==
The adults are flying mellivores.

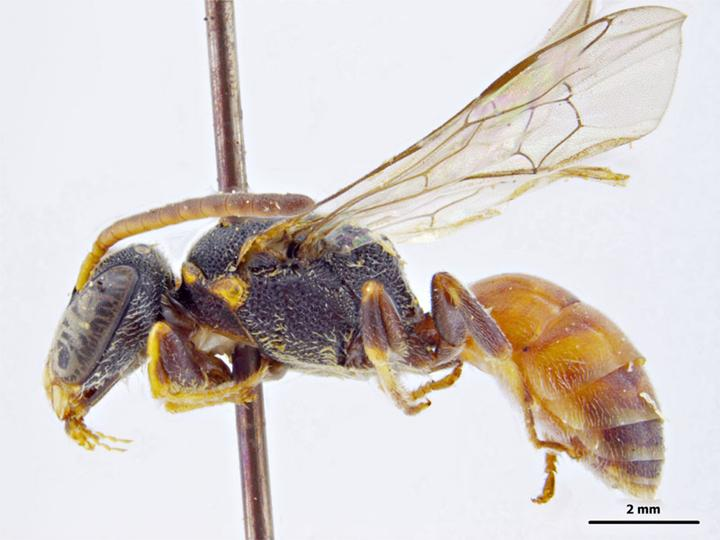
Male
