= Hylaeus pictulus =

Scientific classification
- Kingdom: Animalia
- Phylum: Arthropoda
- Clade: Pancrustacea
- Class: Insecta
- Order: Hymenoptera
- Family: Colletidae
- Genus: Hylaeus
- Species: H. pictulus

Binomial name
- Hylaeus pictulus (Michener, 1965)

Synonyms
- Hylaeus pictus Rayment, 1935

Species of bee

Hylaeus pictulus, or Hylaeus (Prosopisteron) pictulus, is a species of bee in the family Colletidae and subfamily Hylaeinae. It is endemic to Australia. It was described by American entomologist Charles Duncan Michener in 1965.

== Distribution and habitat ==
The species occurs in south-eastern mainland Australia. The type locality is Kiata in north-western Victoria.

== Behaviour ==
The adults are flying mellivores.
