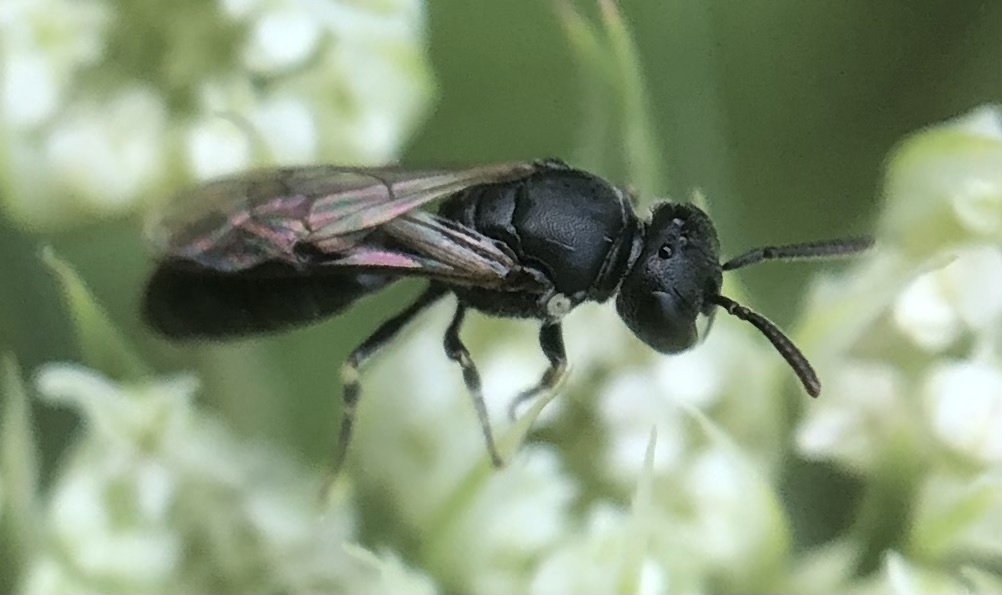
- Hylaeus mesillae cressoni, Georgia

Scientific classification
- Kingdom: Animalia
- Phylum: Arthropoda
- Clade: Pancrustacea
- Class: Insecta
- Order: Hymenoptera
- Family: Colletidae
- Genus: Hylaeus
- Species: H. mesillae

Binomial name
- Hylaeus mesillae (Cockerell, 1896)

= Hylaeus mesillae =

Species of bee

Hylaeus mesillae is a species of bee in the family Colletidae. It is found in Central America and North America.

== Subspecies ==
These three subspecies belong to the species Hylaeus mesillae:

- Hylaeus mesillae cressoni (Cockerell, 1907)
- Hylaeus mesillae cressonii Cockerell, 1907
- Hylaeus mesillae mesillae (Cockerell, 1896)
