= Hylaeus auriferus =

Scientific classification
- Kingdom: Animalia
- Phylum: Arthropoda
- Clade: Pancrustacea
- Class: Insecta
- Order: Hymenoptera
- Family: Colletidae
- Genus: Hylaeus
- Species: H. auriferus

Binomial name
- Hylaeus auriferus (Cockerell, 1918)

Synonyms
- Prosopis aurifera Cockerell, 1918

Species of bee

Hylaeus auriferus, or Hylaeus (Prosopisteron) auriferus, is a species of bee in the family Colletidae and subfamily Hylaeinae. It is endemic to Australia. It was described by British-American entomologist Theodore Dru Alison Cockerell in 1918.

== Description ==
Female body length is about 8 mm. Integumental colouration is mainly black, with chrome yellow markings.

== Distribution and habitat ==
The species occurs in eastern Australia. The type locality is Stradbroke Island in south-eastern Queensland.

== Behaviour ==
The adults are flying mellivores.
