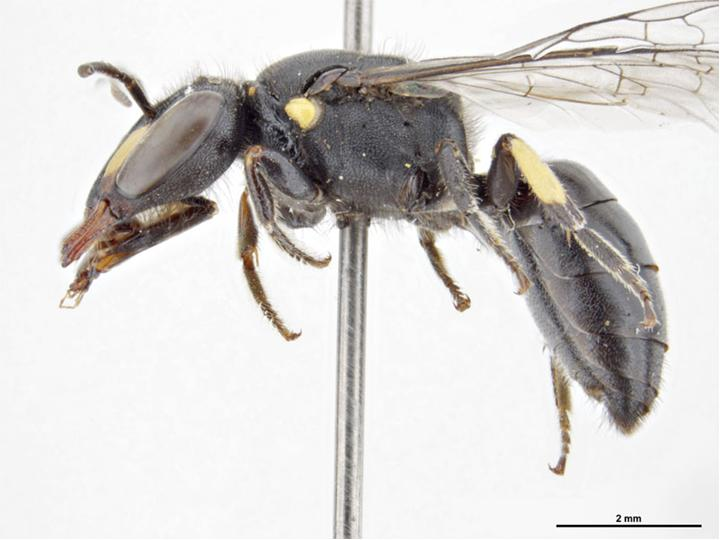
- Female

Scientific classification
- Kingdom: Animalia
- Phylum: Arthropoda
- Clade: Pancrustacea
- Class: Insecta
- Order: Hymenoptera
- Family: Colletidae
- Genus: Hylaeus
- Species: H. desertoris

Binomial name
- Hylaeus desertoris Houston, 1981

= Hylaeus desertoris =

Species of bee

Hylaeus desertoris, or Hylaeus (Xenohylaeus) desertoris, is a species of bee in the family Colletidae and subfamily Hylaeinae. It is endemic to Australia. It was described by Australian entomologist Terry Houston in 1981.

== Distribution and habitat ==
The species occurs in arid western and central Australia. The type locality is Glen Helen in the Northern Territory.

== Behaviour ==
The adults are flying mellivores. Flowering plants visited by the bees include Eremophila species.

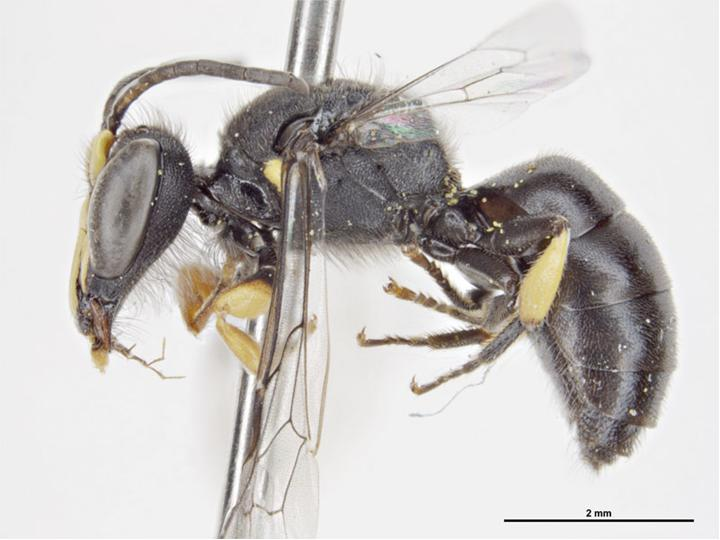
Male
