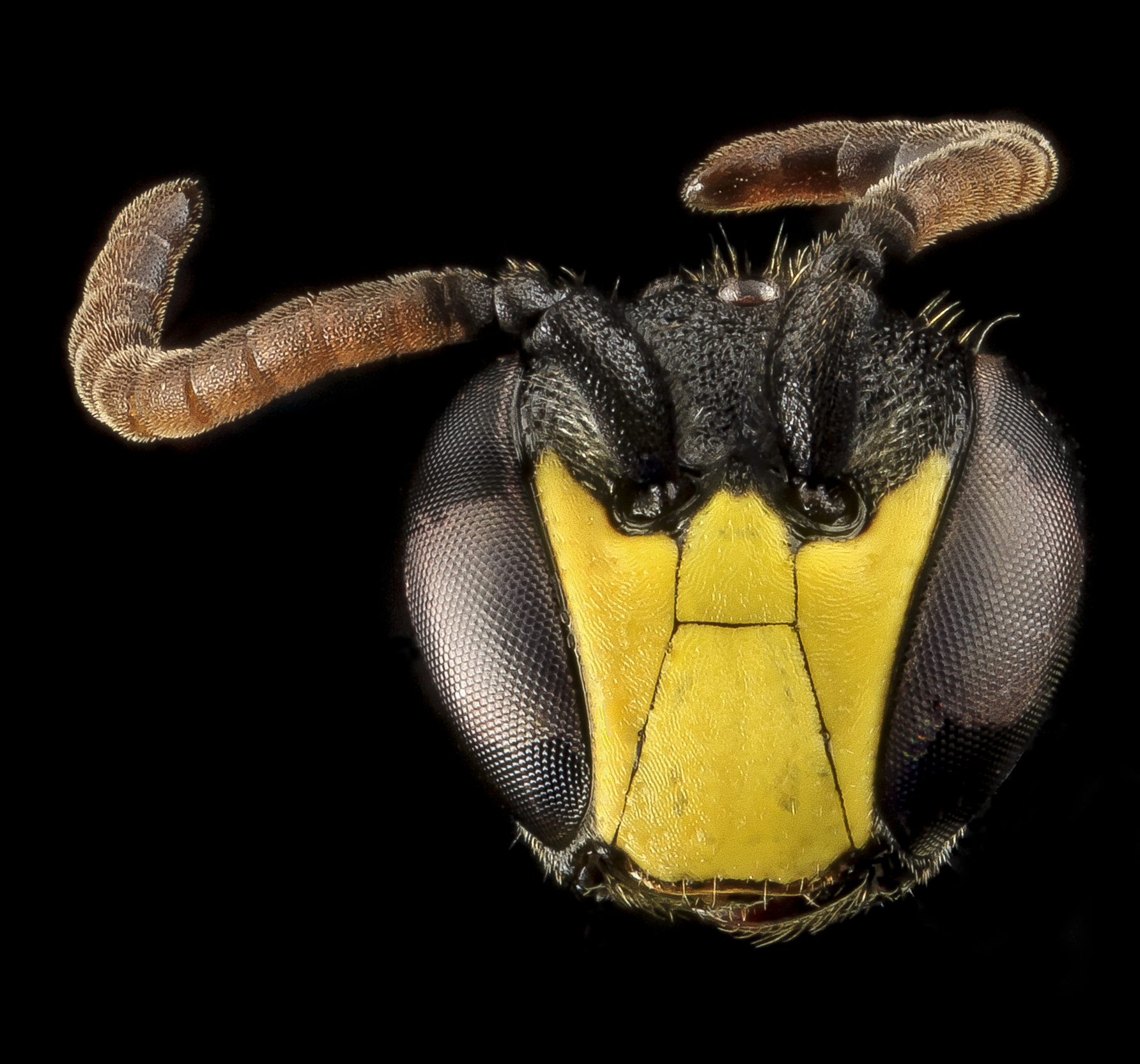
- A male Hylaeus modestus, a masked bee found in the new gardens of Wolf Trap National Park for the Performing Arts

Conservation status
- Secure (NatureServe)

Scientific classification
- Kingdom: Animalia
- Phylum: Arthropoda
- Clade: Pancrustacea
- Class: Insecta
- Order: Hymenoptera
- Family: Colletidae
- Genus: Hylaeus
- Species: H. modestus

Binomial name
- Hylaeus modestus Say, 1837

Subspecies
- H. m. modestus Cockerell, 1896; H. m. citrinifrons Say, 1837

= Hylaeus modestus =

Species of bee

Hylaeus modestus, also known as the modest masked bee, is a species of hymenopteran in the family Colletidae. It is found in North America.

== Behavior ==
Hylaeus modestus was discovered to have a special secretion that they produce from their Dufour's gland. The secretion has a unique chemical compound containing high concentrations of ethyl esters (ethyl palmitate, ethyl stearate, ethyl eicosanate, and ethyl docosanate), which provides extra nutrition to the larvae. Adults apply the secretion on the cell walls of their brood chambers, and the larvae feed on the secretions to obtain the energy needed to pupate and become adults before the other bee species out-compete them for resources.

H. modestus has been found to exhibit gynandromorphism, which is a rare occurrence among bee species. Specifically, the observed specimen demonstrated bilaterally asymmetric male and female characteristics except for the male genitalia.

It is a generalist forager, and it nests in stems and cavities.
