= Hylaeus melanocephalus =

Scientific classification
- Kingdom: Animalia
- Phylum: Arthropoda
- Clade: Pancrustacea
- Class: Insecta
- Order: Hymenoptera
- Family: Colletidae
- Genus: Hylaeus
- Species: H. melanocephalus

Binomial name
- Hylaeus melanocephalus (Cockerell, 1922)

Synonyms
- Prosopis melanocephala Cockerell, 1922

Species of bee

Hylaeus melanocephalus, or Hylaeus (Rhodohylaeus) melanocephalus, is a species of bee in the family Colletidae and subfamily Hylaeinae. It is endemic to Australia. It was described by British-American entomologist Theodore Dru Alison Cockerell in 1922.

== Description ==
Female body length is about 5 mm. Integumental colouration is mainly black, with red markings.

== Distribution and habitat ==
The species occurs in eastern mainland Australia. The type locality is Darra, Brisbane, in south-eastern Queensland.

== Behaviour ==
The adults are flying mellivores.
