= Hylaeus panamensis =

Scientific classification
- Kingdom: Animalia
- Phylum: Arthropoda
- Clade: Pancrustacea
- Class: Insecta
- Order: Hymenoptera
- Family: Colletidae
- Genus: Hylaeus
- Species: H. panamensis

Binomial name
- Hylaeus panamensis Michener, 1954

Species of bee

Hylaeus panamensis is a species of hymenopteran in the family Colletidae. It is found in Central America and North America.
