= Hylaeus constrictus =

Scientific classification
- Kingdom: Animalia
- Phylum: Arthropoda
- Clade: Pancrustacea
- Class: Insecta
- Order: Hymenoptera
- Family: Colletidae
- Genus: Hylaeus
- Species: H. constrictus

Binomial name
- Hylaeus constrictus (Cockerell, 1905)

Synonyms
- Prosopis constricta Cockerell, 1905

Species of bee

Hylaeus constrictus, or Hylaeus (Rhodohylaeus) constrictus, is a species of bee in the family Colletidae and subfamily Hylaeinae. It is endemic to Australia. It was described by British-American entomologist Theodore Dru Alison Cockerell in 1905.

== Distribution and habitat ==
The species occurs in eastern Australia. The type locality is Mackay, Queensland.

== Behaviour ==
The adults are flying mellivores. Flowering plants visited by the bees include Alphitonia, Angophora, Callistemon, Eucalyptus, Leptospermum and Melaleuca species.
