= Hylaeus fijiensis =

Scientific classification
- Kingdom: Animalia
- Phylum: Arthropoda
- Clade: Pancrustacea
- Class: Insecta
- Order: Hymenoptera
- Family: Colletidae
- Genus: Hylaeus
- Species: H. fijiensis

Binomial name
- Hylaeus fijiensis (Cockerell, 1909)

Synonyms
- Prosopis fijiensis Cockerell, 1909; Prosopis chalybaea Friese, 1924; Palaeorhiza gigantea Cockerell, 1926

Species of bee

Hylaeus fijiensis, or Hylaeus (Meghylaeus) fijiensis, is a species of bee in the family Colletidae and subfamily Hylaeinae. It is endemic to Australia. It was described by British-American entomologist Theodore Dru Alison Cockerell in 1909.

== Etymology ==
The specific epithet fijiensis is derived from the holotype being mistakenly labelled as coming from Fiji.

== Description ==
Female body length is 14.5 mm. Integumental colouration is mainly black, with yellow markings and steel blue abdomen.

== Distribution and habitat ==
The species occurs in south-eastern Australia. Type localities include Raymond Island, Victoria.

== Behaviour ==
The adults are flying mellivores.
