= Hylaeus episcopalis =

Scientific classification
- Kingdom: Animalia
- Phylum: Arthropoda
- Clade: Pancrustacea
- Class: Insecta
- Order: Hymenoptera
- Family: Colletidae
- Genus: Hylaeus
- Species: H. episcopalis

Binomial name
- Hylaeus episcopalis (Cockerell, 1896)

Species of bee

Hylaeus episcopalis is a species of hymenopteran in the family Colletidae. It is found in North America.

== Subspecies ==
These three subspecies belong to the species Hylaeus episcopalis:

- Hylaeus episcopalis coquilletti (Cockerell, 1896)
- Hylaeus episcopalis episcopalis (Cockerell, 1896)
- Hylaeus episcopalis giffardiellus Cockerell, 1925
- Hylaeus episcopalis metzi Snelling, 1966
