= Hylaeus jacksoniae =

Scientific classification
- Kingdom: Animalia
- Phylum: Arthropoda
- Clade: Pancrustacea
- Class: Insecta
- Order: Hymenoptera
- Family: Colletidae
- Genus: Hylaeus
- Species: H. jacksoniae

Binomial name
- Hylaeus jacksoniae Houston, 1981

Species of bee

Hylaeus jacksoniae, or Hylaeus (Planihylaeus) jacksoniae, is a species of bee in the family Colletidae and subfamily Hylaeinae. It is endemic to Australia. It was described by Australian entomologist Terry Houston in 1981.

== Distribution and habitat ==
The species occurs in eastern Australia. The type locality is Mount Coot-tha, in south-eastern Queensland. It has also been recorded from the Manning Valley in north-eastern New South Wales.

== Behaviour ==
The adults are flying mellivores. Flowering plants visited by the bees include Jacksonia species.
