= Hylaeus rufipes =

Scientific classification
- Kingdom: Animalia
- Phylum: Arthropoda
- Clade: Pancrustacea
- Class: Insecta
- Order: Hymenoptera
- Family: Colletidae
- Genus: Hylaeus
- Species: H. rufipes

Binomial name
- Hylaeus rufipes (Smith, 1853)

Synonyms
- Prosopis rufipes Smith, 1853

Species of bee

Hylaeus rufipes, or Hylaeus (Rhodohylaeus) rufipes, is a species of bee in the family Colletidae and subfamily Hylaeinae. It is endemic to Australia. It was described by English entomologist Frederick Smith in 1853.

== Distribution and habitat ==
The type locality is simply "New Holland", with further precision unknown.

== Behaviour ==
The adults are flying mellivores.
