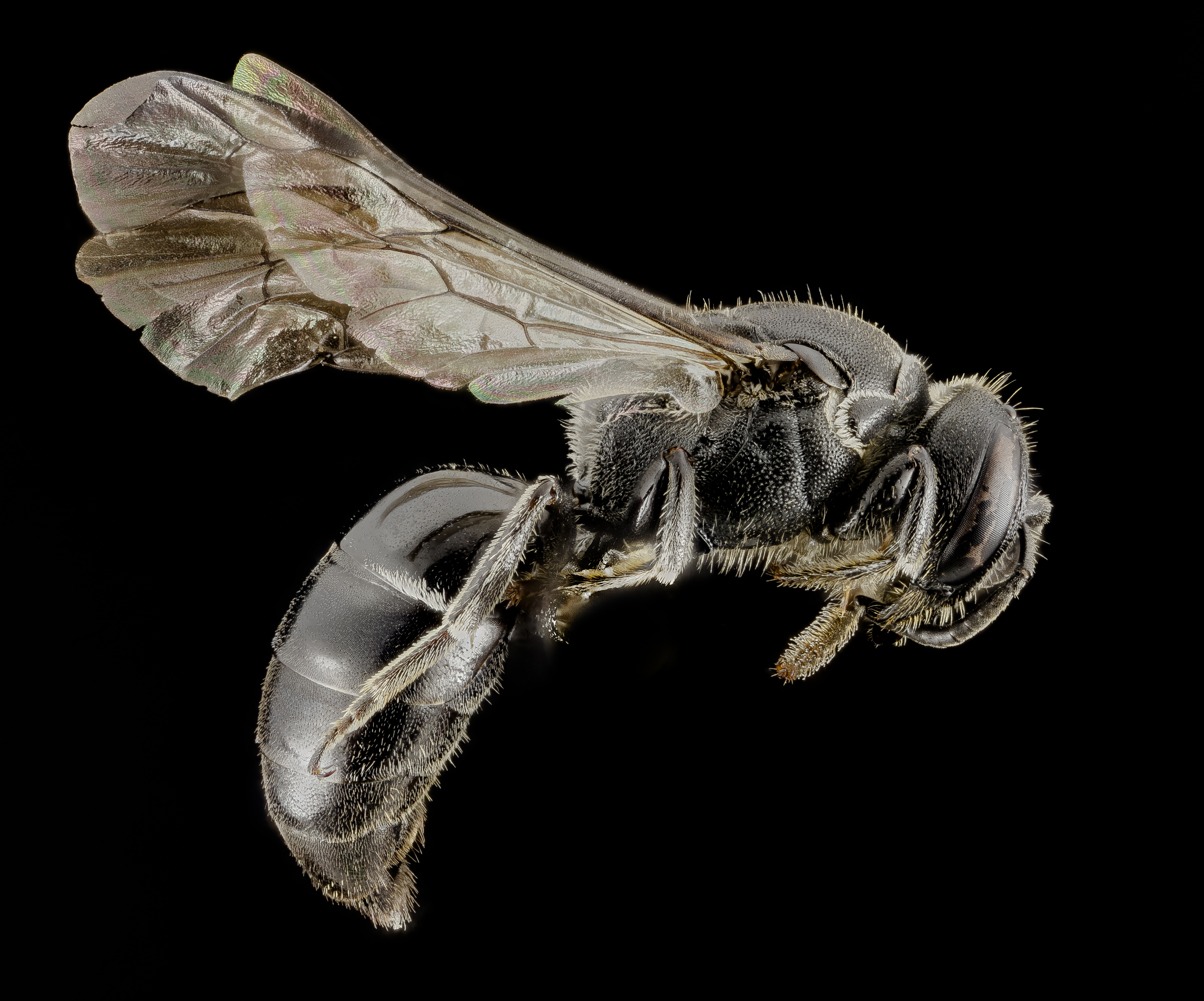

Scientific classification
- Kingdom: Animalia
- Phylum: Arthropoda
- Clade: Pancrustacea
- Class: Insecta
- Order: Hymenoptera
- Family: Colletidae
- Genus: Hylaeus
- Species: H. basalis

Binomial name
- Hylaeus basalis (Smith, 1853)

= Hylaeus basalis =

Species of bee

Hylaeus basalis is a species of hymenopteran in the family Colletidae. It is found in North America.
