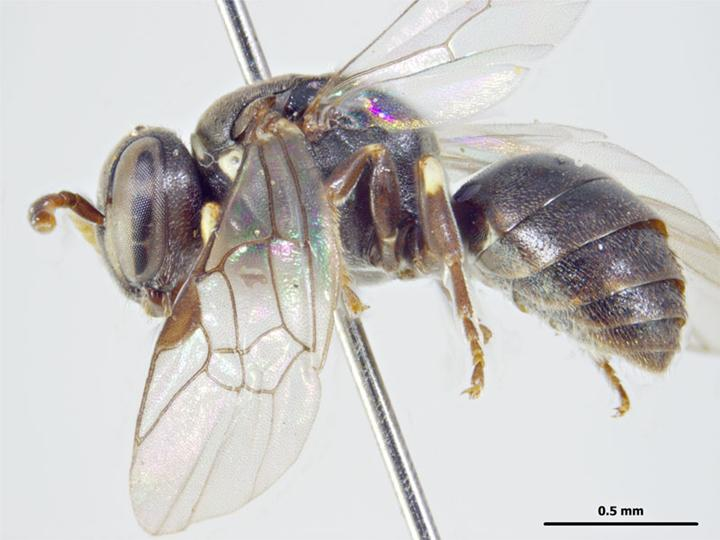
- Female

Scientific classification
- Kingdom: Animalia
- Phylum: Arthropoda
- Clade: Pancrustacea
- Class: Insecta
- Order: Hymenoptera
- Family: Colletidae
- Genus: Hylaeus
- Species: H. philoleucus

Binomial name
- Hylaeus philoleucus (Cockerell, 1910)

Synonyms
- Prosopis philoleuca Cockerell, 1910; Prosopis eburniella Cockerell, 1912

= Hylaeus philoleucus =

Species of bee

Hylaeus philoleucus, or Hylaeus (Gnathoprosopoides) philoleucus, is a species of bee in the family Colletidae and subfamily Hylaeinae. It is endemic to Australia. It was described by British-American entomologist Theodore Dru Alison Cockerell in 1910.

== Description ==
Female body length is about 4 mm. Integumental colouration is mainly black, with white markings.

== Distribution and habitat ==
The species occurs in eastern mainland Australia. Type localities include Mackay, Queensland as well as Sydney.

== Behaviour ==
The adults are flying mellivores. Flowering plants visited by the bees include Angophora, Eucalyptus, Leptospermum and Tristaniopsis species.

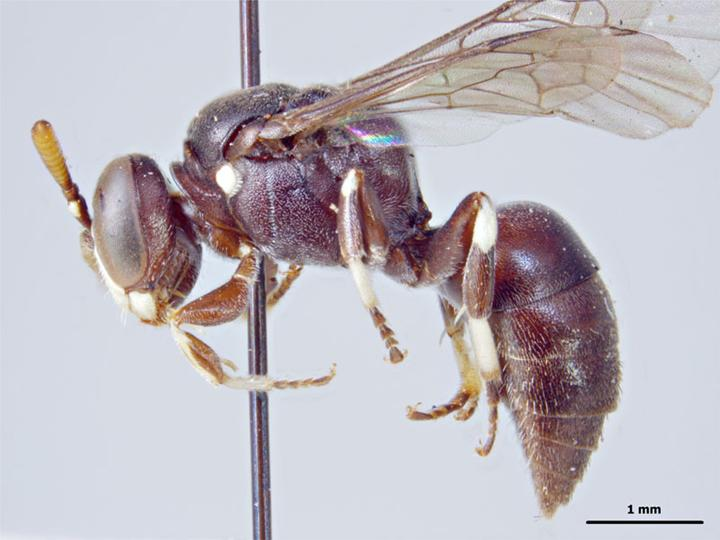
Male
