= Hylaeus coronatulus =

Scientific classification
- Kingdom: Animalia
- Phylum: Arthropoda
- Clade: Pancrustacea
- Class: Insecta
- Order: Hymenoptera
- Family: Colletidae
- Genus: Hylaeus
- Species: H. coronatulus

Binomial name
- Hylaeus coronatulus (Cockerell, 1914)

Synonyms
- Prosopis coronatula Cockerell, 1914

Species of bee

Hylaeus coronatulus, or Hylaeus (Rhodohylaeus) coronatulus, is a species of bee in the family Colletidae and subfamily Hylaeinae. It is endemic to Australia. It was described by British-American entomologist Theodore Dru Alison Cockerell in 1914.

== Description ==
Male body length is about 4 mm. Integumental colouration is mainly black, with white and reddish markings, the abdomen red.

== Distribution and habitat ==
The species occurs in inland Australia. The type locality is Brewarrina in north-western New South Wales.

== Behaviour ==
The adults are flying mellivores.
