= Hylaeus graenicheri =

Scientific classification
- Kingdom: Animalia
- Phylum: Arthropoda
- Clade: Pancrustacea
- Class: Insecta
- Order: Hymenoptera
- Family: Colletidae
- Genus: Hylaeus
- Species: H. graenicheri

Binomial name
- Hylaeus graenicheri Mitchell, 1951

Species of bee

Hylaeus graenicheri is a species of hymenopteran in the family Colletidae. It is found in North America. The species is one of five in the family Colletidae that are endemic to Florida, and is only found in the southern portion of the state.
