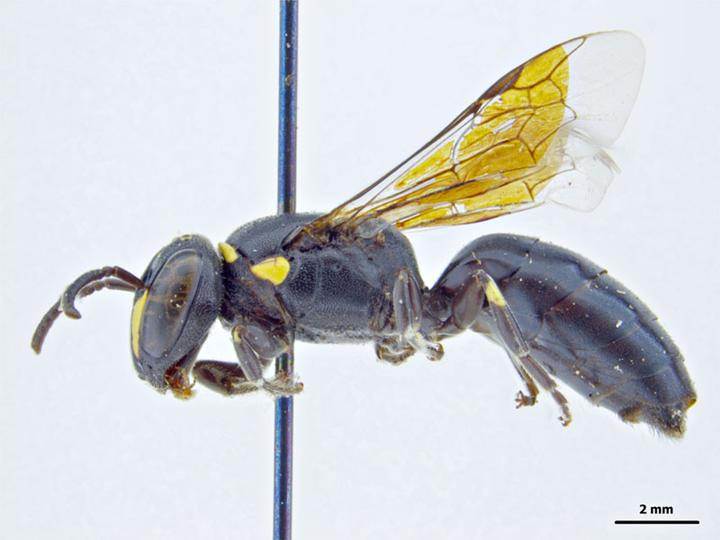
- Female

Scientific classification
- Kingdom: Animalia
- Phylum: Arthropoda
- Clade: Pancrustacea
- Class: Insecta
- Order: Hymenoptera
- Family: Colletidae
- Genus: Hylaeus
- Species: H. microphenax

Binomial name
- Hylaeus microphenax (Cockerell, 1910)

Synonyms
- Prosopis microphenax Cockerell, 1910

= Hylaeus microphenax =

Species of bee

Hylaeus microphenax, or Hylaeus (Prosopisteron) microphenax, is a species of bee in the family Colletidae and subfamily Hylaeinae. It is endemic to Australia. It was described by British-American entomologist Theodore Dru Alison Cockerell in 1910.

== Description ==
Male body length is about 5 mm. Integumental colouration is mainly black, with yellow markings.

== Distribution and habitat ==
The species occurs in eastern mainland Australia. The type locality is Mackay, Queensland. It has also been recorded from Manning Valley in north-eastern New South Wales.

== Behaviour ==
The adults are flying mellivores. Flowering plants visited by the bees include Cassia species.

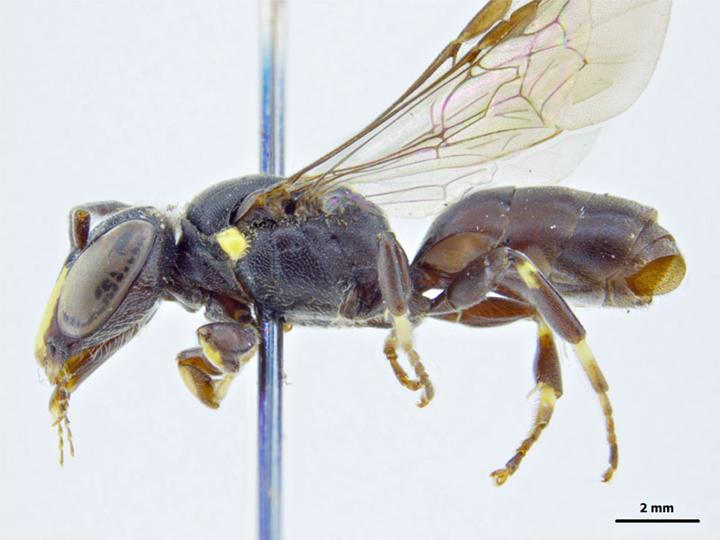
Male
