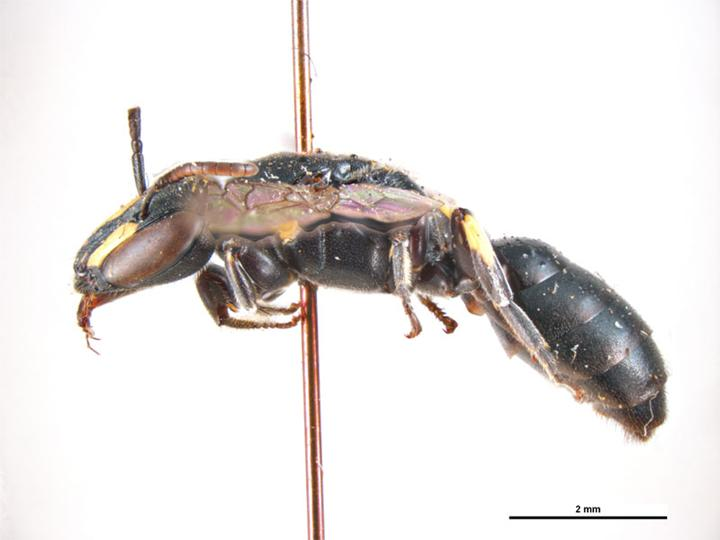
- Female

Scientific classification
- Kingdom: Animalia
- Phylum: Arthropoda
- Clade: Pancrustacea
- Class: Insecta
- Order: Hymenoptera
- Family: Colletidae
- Genus: Hylaeus
- Species: H. daviesiae

Binomial name
- Hylaeus daviesiae Houston, 1981

Synonyms
- Planihylaeus daviesiae

= Hylaeus daviesiae =

Species of bee

Hylaeus daviesiae, or Hylaeus (Planihylaeus) daviesiae, is a species of bee in the family Colletidae and subfamily Hylaeinae. It is endemic to Australia. It was described by Australian entomologist Terry Houston in 1981.

== Distribution and habitat ==
The species occurs in eastern Australia. The type locality is Black Mountain, in the Australian Capital Territory.

== Behaviour ==
The adults are flying mellivores. Flowering plants visited by the bees include Aotus and Daviesia species.
