= Hylaeus krombeini =

Scientific classification
- Kingdom: Animalia
- Phylum: Arthropoda
- Clade: Pancrustacea
- Class: Insecta
- Order: Hymenoptera
- Family: Colletidae
- Genus: Hylaeus
- Species: H. krombeini

Binomial name
- Hylaeus krombeini Snelling, 1980

Species of bee

Hylaeus krombeini is a bee species endemic to Asia.
