= Hylaeus ceniberus =

Scientific classification
- Kingdom: Animalia
- Phylum: Arthropoda
- Clade: Pancrustacea
- Class: Insecta
- Order: Hymenoptera
- Family: Colletidae
- Genus: Hylaeus
- Species: H. ceniberus

Binomial name
- Hylaeus ceniberus (Cockerell, 1910)

Synonyms
- Prosopis cenibera Cockerell, 1910

Species of bee

Hylaeus ceniberus, or Hylaeus (Rhodohylaeus) ceniberus, is a species of bee in the family Colletidae and subfamily Hylaeinae. It is endemic to Australia. It was described by British-American entomologist Theodore Dru Alison Cockerell in 1910.

== Description ==
Integumental colouration is mainly black, with cream and red markings.

== Distribution and habitat ==
The species occurs in north-eastern Australia. The type locality is Mackay, Queensland.

== Behaviour ==
The adults are flying mellivores. Flowering plants visited by the bees include Angophora, Callistemon, Eucalyptus, Leptospermum and Xanthorrhoea species.
