= Hylaeus ancoratus =

Scientific classification
- Kingdom: Animalia
- Phylum: Arthropoda
- Clade: Pancrustacea
- Class: Insecta
- Order: Hymenoptera
- Family: Colletidae
- Genus: Hylaeus
- Species: H. ancoratus

Binomial name
- Hylaeus ancoratus (Cockerell, 1912)

Synonyms
- Prosopis ancorata Cockerell, 1912

Species of bee

Hylaeus ancoratus, or Hylaeus (Rhodohylaeus) ancoratus, is a species of bee in the family Colletidae and subfamily Hylaeinae. It is endemic to Australia. It was described by British-American entomologist Theodore Dru Alison Cockerell in 1912.

== Description ==
Male body length is about 4.5 mm. Integumental colouration is mainly black, with cream markings.

== Distribution and habitat ==
The species occurs in eastern mainland Australia. The type locality is Sydney.

== Behaviour ==
The adults are flying mellivores. Flowering plants visited by the bees include Angophora species.
