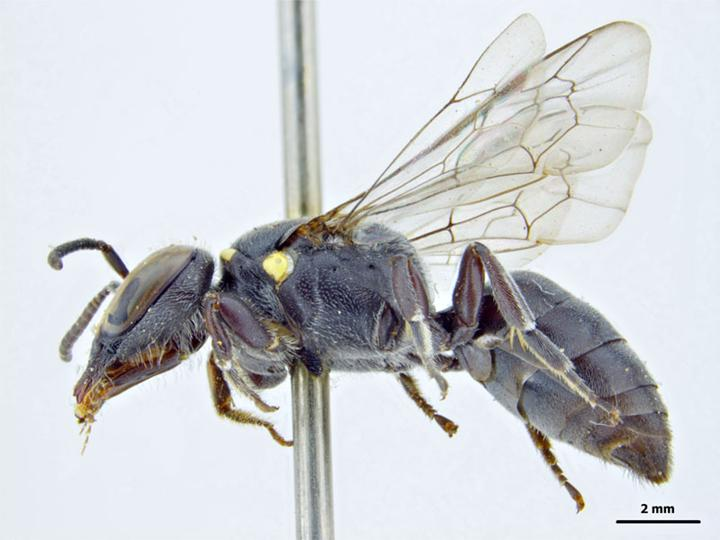
- Female

Scientific classification
- Kingdom: Animalia
- Phylum: Arthropoda
- Clade: Pancrustacea
- Class: Insecta
- Order: Hymenoptera
- Family: Colletidae
- Genus: Hylaeus
- Species: H. leptospermi

Binomial name
- Hylaeus leptospermi (Cockerell, 1922)

Synonyms
- Prosopis leptospermi Cockerell, 1922; Hylaeus (Xenohylaeus) rieki Michener, 1965

= Hylaeus leptospermi =

Species of bee

Hylaeus leptospermi, or Hylaeus (Xenohylaeus) leptospermi, is a species of bee in the family Colletidae and subfamily Hylaeinae. It is endemic to Australia. It was described by British-American entomologist Theodore Dru Alison Cockerell in 1922.

== Description ==
Female body length is about 7.5 mm. Integumental colouration is mainly black, with pale yellow markings.

== Distribution and habitat ==
The species occurs in eastern mainland Australia. The type locality is Sunnybank, in south-eastern Queensland.

== Behaviour ==
The adults are flying mellivores. Flowering plants visited by the bees include Daviesia, Jacksonia and Leptospermum species.

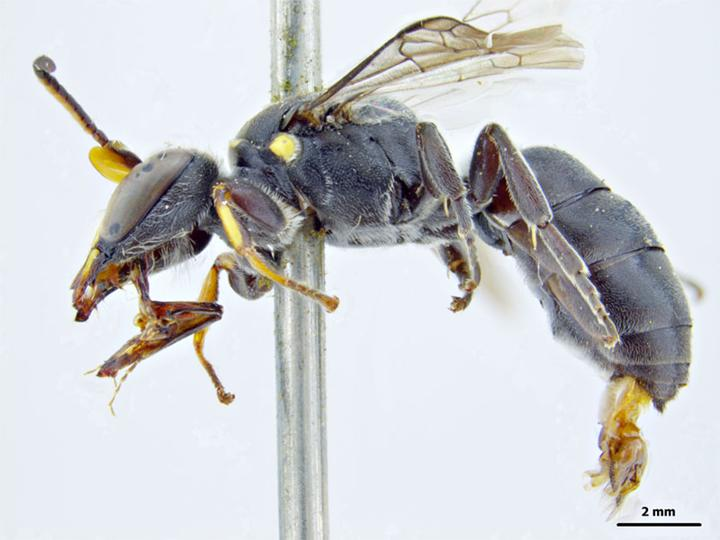
Male
