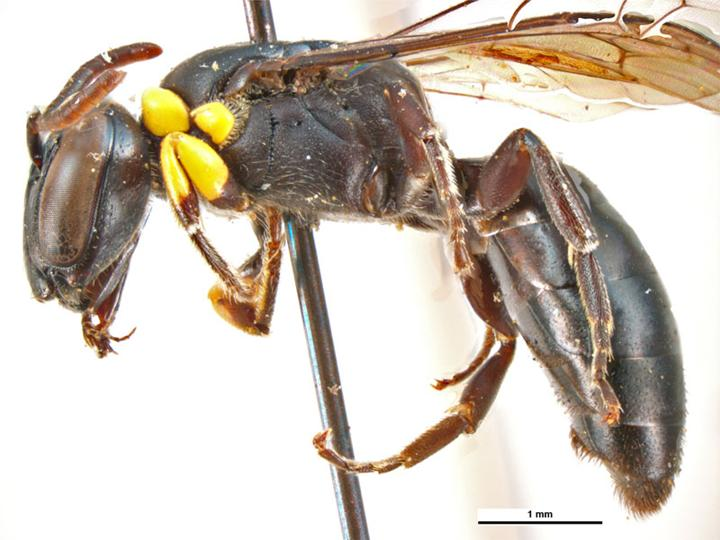
- Female

Scientific classification
- Kingdom: Animalia
- Phylum: Arthropoda
- Clade: Pancrustacea
- Class: Insecta
- Order: Hymenoptera
- Family: Colletidae
- Genus: Hylaeus
- Species: H. turgicollaris

Binomial name
- Hylaeus turgicollaris Michener, 1965

Synonyms
- Meroglossa xanthocollaris Rayment, 1954

= Hylaeus turgicollaris =

Species of bee

Hylaeus turgicollaris, or Hylaeus (Prosopisteron) turgicollaris, is a species of bee in the family Colletidae and subfamily Hylaeinae. It is endemic to Australia. It was described by American entomologist Charles Duncan Michener in 1965.

== Distribution and habitat ==
The species occurs in eastern mainland Australia. The type locality is Jamberoo, New South Wales.

== Behaviour ==
The adults are flying mellivores. Flowering plants visited by the bees include Leptospermum species.
