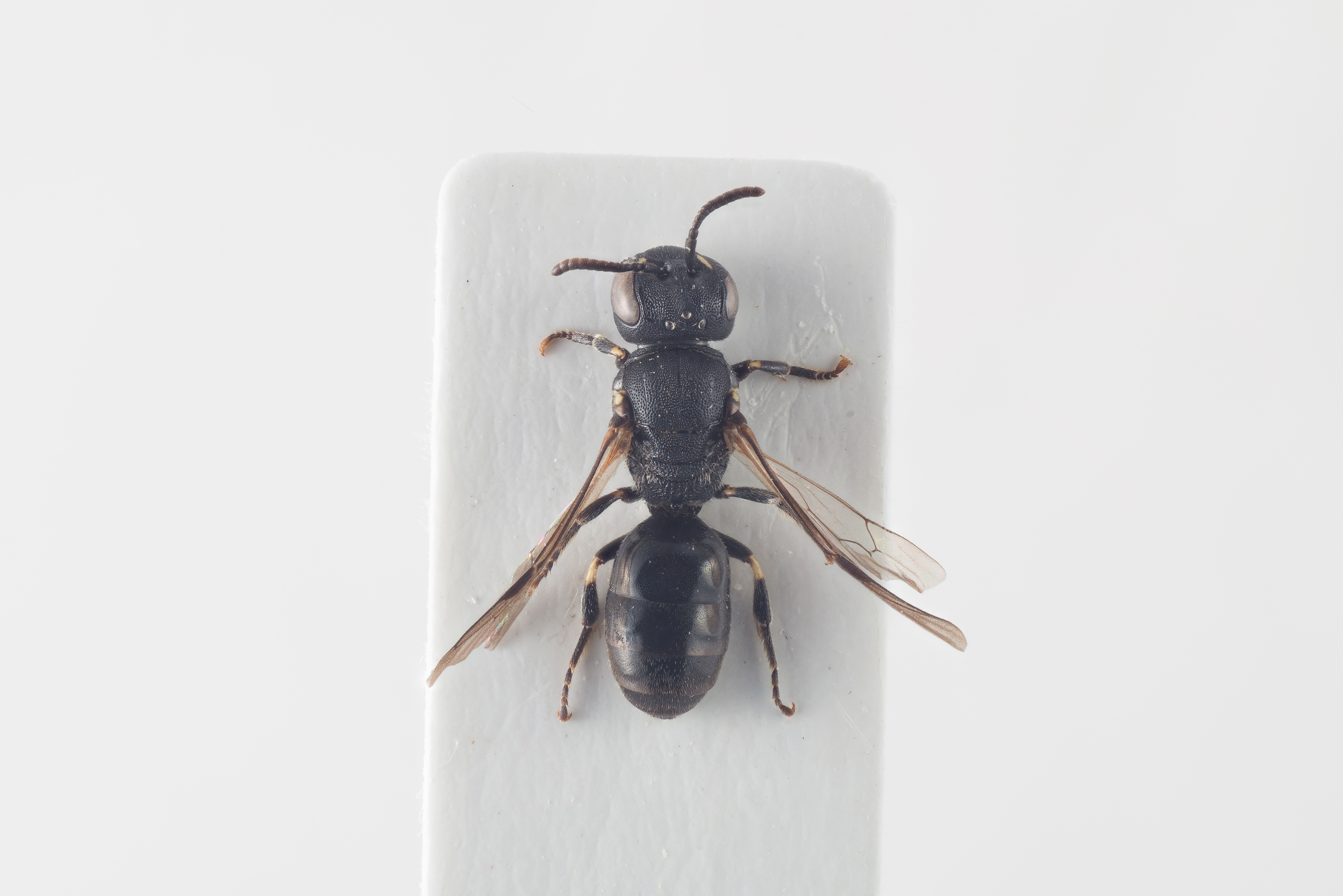

Scientific classification
- Kingdom: Animalia
- Phylum: Arthropoda
- Clade: Pancrustacea
- Class: Insecta
- Order: Hymenoptera
- Family: Colletidae
- Subfamily: Hylaeinae
- Genus: Hylaeus
- Species: H. brevicornis

Binomial name
- Hylaeus brevicornis Nylander, 1852

= Hylaeus brevicornis =

Species of bee

Hylaeus brevicornis is a Palearctic species of solitary bee.
