= Hylaeus indecisus =

Scientific classification
- Kingdom: Animalia
- Phylum: Arthropoda
- Clade: Pancrustacea
- Class: Insecta
- Order: Hymenoptera
- Family: Colletidae
- Genus: Hylaeus
- Species: H. indecisus

Binomial name
- Hylaeus indecisus Cockerell, 1929

Species of bee

Hylaeus indecisus, or Hylaeus (Rhodohylaeus) indecisus, is a species of bee in the family Colletidae and subfamily Hylaeinae. It is endemic to Australia. It was described by British-American entomologist Theodore Dru Alison Cockerell in 1929.

== Description ==
Female body length is about 6.3 mm. Integumental colouration is mainly black, with cream to yellow markings, the abdomen dusky red.

== Distribution and habitat ==
The species occurs in eastern Australia. The type locality is Sydney.

== Behaviour ==
The adults are flying mellivores.
