= Hylaeus polifolii =

Scientific classification
- Kingdom: Animalia
- Phylum: Arthropoda
- Clade: Pancrustacea
- Class: Insecta
- Order: Hymenoptera
- Family: Colletidae
- Genus: Hylaeus
- Species: H. polifolii

Binomial name
- Hylaeus polifolii (Cockerell, 1901)

Species of bee

Hylaeus polifolii is a species of hymenopteran in the family Colletidae. It is found in North America.

== Subspecies ==
These two subspecies belong to the species Hylaeus polifolii:

- Hylaeus polifolii catalinensis Cockerell
- Hylaeus polifolii polifolii
