= Hawaiian yellow-faced bee =

Hawaiian yellow-faced bee is a common name for several Hawaiian species of Hylaeus bee and may refer to:

- Hylaeus kuakea
- Hylaeus longiceps
- Hylaeus mana
