= Hylaeus pergibbosus =

Scientific classification
- Kingdom: Animalia
- Phylum: Arthropoda
- Clade: Pancrustacea
- Class: Insecta
- Order: Hymenoptera
- Family: Colletidae
- Genus: Hylaeus
- Species: H. pergibbosus

Binomial name
- Hylaeus pergibbosus Cockerell, 1926

Synonyms
- Hylaeus pergibbosus Cockerell, 1926

Species of bee

Hylaeus pergibbosus, or Hylaeus (Euprosopellus) pergibbosus, is a species of bee in the family Colletidae and subfamily Hylaeinae. It is endemic to Australia. It was described by British-American entomologist Theodore Dru Alison Cockerell in 1926.

== Distribution and habitat ==
The species occurs in south-eastern mainland Australia. The type locality is Kewell, Victoria.

== Behaviour ==
The adults are flying mellivores.
