= Hylaeus elongatus =

Scientific classification
- Kingdom: Animalia
- Phylum: Arthropoda
- Clade: Pancrustacea
- Class: Insecta
- Order: Hymenoptera
- Family: Colletidae
- Genus: Hylaeus
- Species: H. elongatus

Binomial name
- Hylaeus elongatus (Smith, 1879)

Synonyms
- Prosopis elongata Smith, 1879

Species of bee

Hylaeus elongatus, or Hylaeus (Prosopisteron) elongatus, is a species of bee in the family Colletidae and subfamily Hylaeinae. It is endemic to Australia. It was described by English entomologist Frederick Smith in 1879.

== Distribution and habitat ==
The species occurs in southern Australia. The type locality is Adelaide.

== Behaviour ==
The adults are flying mellivores. Flowering plants visited by the bees include Leptospermum species.
