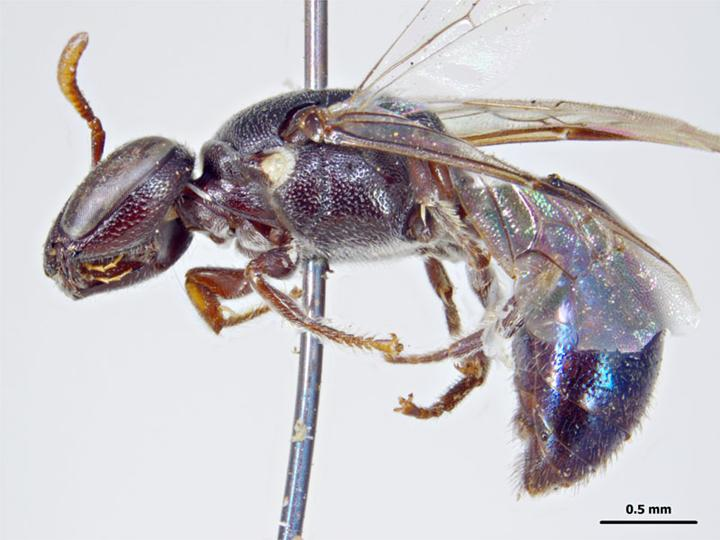
- Female

Scientific classification
- Kingdom: Animalia
- Phylum: Arthropoda
- Clade: Pancrustacea
- Class: Insecta
- Order: Hymenoptera
- Family: Colletidae
- Genus: Hylaeus
- Species: H. cyaneomicans

Binomial name
- Hylaeus cyaneomicans (Cockerell, 1910)

Synonyms
- Prosopis cyaneomicans Cockerell, 1910

= Hylaeus cyaneomicans =

Species of bee

Hylaeus cyaneomicans, or Hylaeus (Prosopisteron) cyaneomicans, is a species of bee in the family Colletidae and subfamily Hylaeinae. It is endemic to Australia. It was described by British-American entomologist Theodore Dru Alison Cockerell in 1910.

== Description ==
Female body length is about 6 mm. Integumental colouration is mainly black, without pale markings, but with a brilliant blue abdomen.

== Distribution and habitat ==
The species occurs in north-eastern Australia. The type locality is Mackay, Queensland.

== Behaviour ==
The adults are flying mellivores. Flowering plants visited by the bees include Cassia species.
