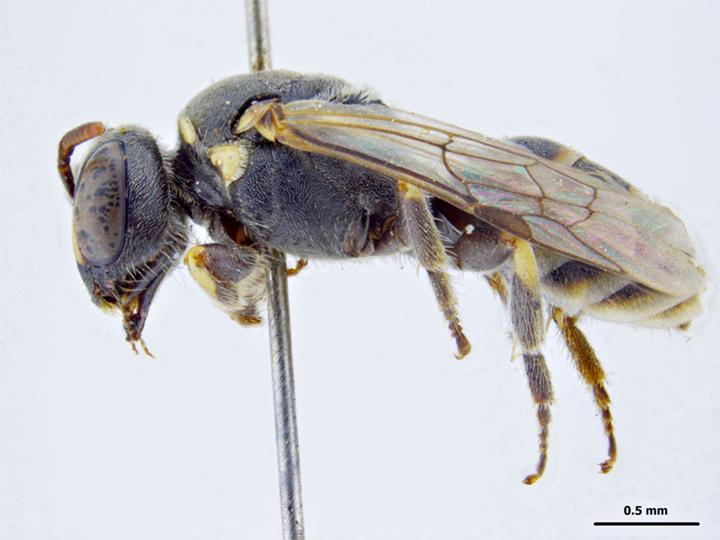
- Female

Scientific classification
- Kingdom: Animalia
- Phylum: Arthropoda
- Clade: Pancrustacea
- Class: Insecta
- Order: Hymenoptera
- Family: Colletidae
- Genus: Hylaeus
- Species: H. albocuneatus

Binomial name
- Hylaeus albocuneatus (Cockerell, 1913)

Synonyms
- Euryglossa albocuneata Cockerell, 1913

= Hylaeus albocuneatus =

Species of bee

Hylaeus albocuneatus, or Hylaeus (Pseudhylaeus) albocuneatus, is a species of bee in the family Colletidae and subfamily Hylaeinae. It is endemic to Australia. It was described by British-American entomologist Theodore Dru Alison Cockerell in 1913.

== Description ==
Female body length is about 5 mm. Integumental colouration is mainly black, with white markings.

== Distribution and habitat ==
The species occurs in eastern mainland Australia. The type locality is Windsor, Victoria.

== Behaviour ==
The adults are flying mellivores. Flowering plants visited by the bees include Wahlenbergia species.

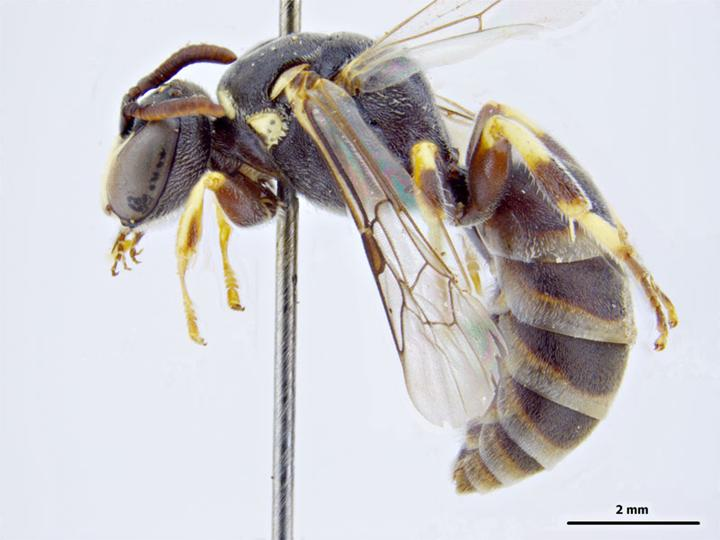
Male
