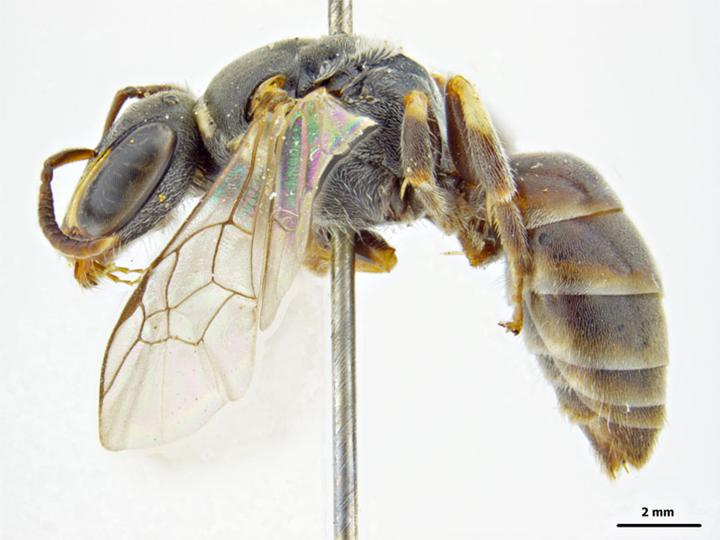
- Female

Scientific classification
- Kingdom: Animalia
- Phylum: Arthropoda
- Clade: Pancrustacea
- Class: Insecta
- Order: Hymenoptera
- Family: Colletidae
- Genus: Hylaeus
- Species: H. hypoleucus

Binomial name
- Hylaeus hypoleucus (Cockerell, 1918)

Synonyms
- Euryglossa hypoleuca Cockerell, 1918

= Hylaeus hypoleucus =

Species of bee

Hylaeus hypoleucus, or Hylaeus (Pseudhylaeus) hypoleucus, is a species of bee in the family Colletidae and subfamily Hylaeinae. It is endemic to Australia. It was described by British-American entomologist Theodore Dru Alison Cockerell in 1918.

== Description ==
Male body length is about 5 mm. Integumental colouration is mainly black, with white and pale yellow markings.

== Distribution and habitat ==
The species occurs in eastern Australia. The type locality is Brisbane in south-eastern Queensland.

== Behaviour ==
The adults are flying mellivores.

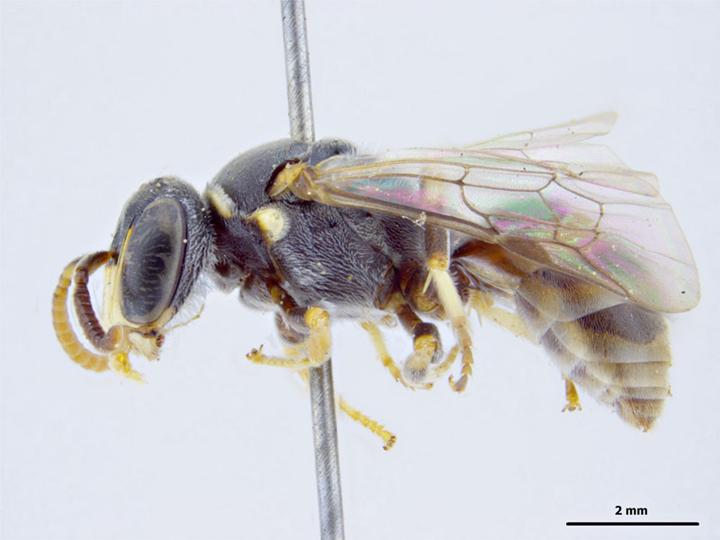
Male
