= Hylaeus xanthopsyche =

Scientific classification
- Kingdom: Animalia
- Phylum: Arthropoda
- Clade: Pancrustacea
- Class: Insecta
- Order: Hymenoptera
- Family: Colletidae
- Genus: Hylaeus
- Species: H. xanthopsyche

Binomial name
- Hylaeus xanthopsyche (Cockerell, 1922)

Synonyms
- Prosopis xanthopsyche Cockerell, 1922

Species of bee

Hylaeus xanthopsyche, or Hylaeus (Prosopisteron) xanthopsyche, is a species of bee in the family Colletidae and subfamily Hylaeinae. It is endemic to Australia. It was described by British-American entomologist Theodore Dru Alison Cockerell in 1922.

== Etymology ==
According to Cockerell: "The specific name is fanciful, given because the yellow area of face, viewed upside down, has the outline of a moth with wings directed backward."

== Description ==
Male body length is about 4.5 mm. Integumental colouration is mainly black, with yellow markings.

== Distribution and habitat ==
The species occurs in eastern mainland Australia. The type locality is Brisbane, in south-eastern Queensland.

== Behaviour ==
The adults are flying mellivores.
