= Hylaeus mediovirens =

Scientific classification
- Kingdom: Animalia
- Phylum: Arthropoda
- Clade: Pancrustacea
- Class: Insecta
- Order: Hymenoptera
- Family: Colletidae
- Genus: Hylaeus
- Species: H. mediovirens

Binomial name
- Hylaeus mediovirens (Cockerell, 1913)

Synonyms
- Prosopis mediovirens Cockerell, 1913

Species of bee

Hylaeus mediovirens, or Hylaeus (Prosopisteron) mediovirens, is a species of bee in the family Colletidae and subfamily Hylaeinae. It is endemic to Australia. It was described by British-American entomologist Theodore Dru Alison Cockerell in 1913.

== Description ==
Female body length is about 4.5 mm. Integumental colouration is mainly dark green, with cream to pinkish-white markings.

== Distribution and habitat ==
The species occurs in south-eastern Australia. The type locality is Purnong, South Australia. It has also been recorded from Launceston, Tasmania.

== Behaviour ==
The adults are flying mellivores.
