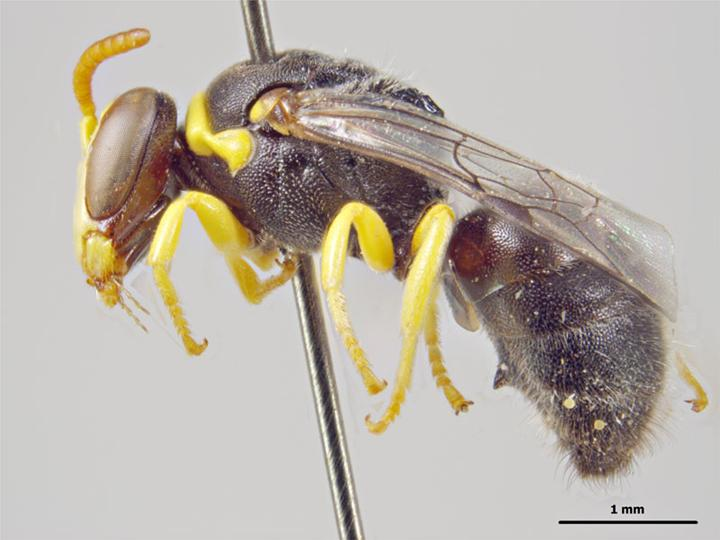

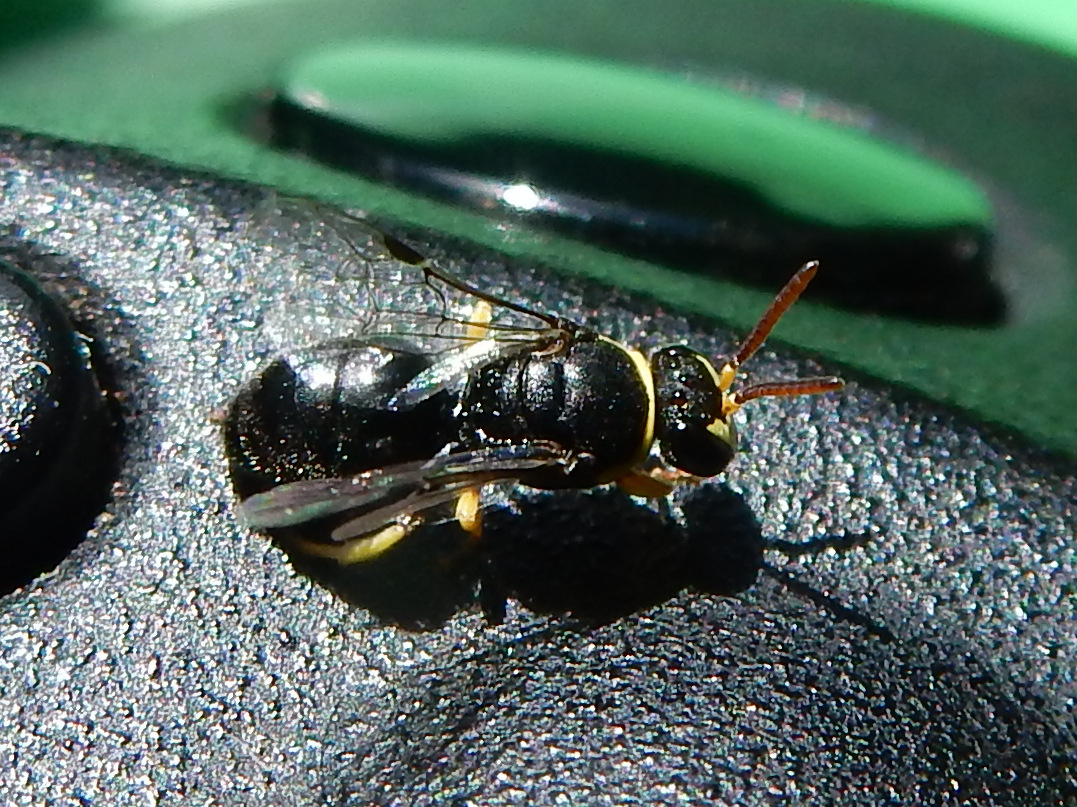

Scientific classification
- Kingdom: Animalia
- Phylum: Arthropoda
- Clade: Pancrustacea
- Class: Insecta
- Order: Hymenoptera
- Family: Colletidae
- Genus: Hylaeus
- Species: H. euxanthus

Binomial name
- Hylaeus euxanthus (Cockerell, 1910)

Synonyms
- Prosopis xanthopoda Prosopis euxantha

= Hylaeus euxanthus =

Yellow collared masked bee

Species of bee

Hylaeus euxanthus is a species of hymenopteran in the family Colletidae and the subgenus Gnathoprosopis. It is found in Australia.

== Taxonomy ==
It was first described as Prosopis xanthopoda by Cockerell in 1910. In a subsequent publication in 1910, he renamed the species Prosopis euxantha due to the former name being preoccupied by Prosopis xanthopoda Vachal, 1895.
