= Hylaeus crassifemoratus =

Scientific classification
- Kingdom: Animalia
- Phylum: Arthropoda
- Clade: Pancrustacea
- Class: Insecta
- Order: Hymenoptera
- Family: Colletidae
- Genus: Hylaeus
- Species: H. crassifemoratus

Binomial name
- Hylaeus crassifemoratus (Cockerell, 1922)

Synonyms
- Prosopis crassifemorata Cockerell, 1922

Species of bee

Hylaeus crassifemoratus, or Hylaeus (Prosopisteron) crassifemoratus, is a species of bee in the family Colletidae and subfamily Hylaeinae. It is endemic to Australia. It was described by British-American entomologist Theodore Dru Alison Cockerell in 1922.

== Description ==
Male body length is about 6 mm. Integumental colouration is mainly black, with bright chrome yellow markings. According to Cockerell, it is "a peculiar little species, best recognised by the hind femora" which are "very stout, covered beneath with dense white felt-like hair".

== Distribution and habitat ==
The species occurs in eastern mainland Australia. The type locality is Sunnybank, Brisbane, in south-eastern Queensland.

== Behaviour ==
The adults are flying mellivores.
