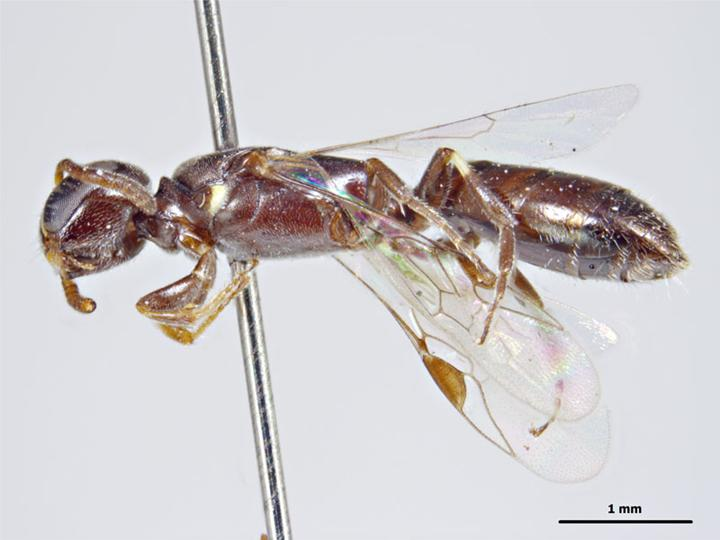
- Female

Scientific classification
- Kingdom: Animalia
- Phylum: Arthropoda
- Clade: Pancrustacea
- Class: Insecta
- Order: Hymenoptera
- Family: Colletidae
- Genus: Hylaeus
- Species: H. delicatus

Binomial name
- Hylaeus delicatus (Cockerell, 1911)

Synonyms
- Heterapis delicata Cockerell, 1911

= Hylaeus delicatus =

Species of bee

Hylaeus delicatus, or Hylaeus (Heterapoides) delicatus, is a species of bee in the family Colletidae and subfamily Hylaeinae. It is endemic to Australia. It was described by British-American entomologist Theodore Dru Alison Cockerell in 1911.

== Description ==
Female body length is about 3.3 mm. Integumental colouration is mainly black, with yellow and reddish markings.

== Distribution and habitat ==
The species occurs in eastern mainland Australia. The type locality is Mackay, Queensland.

== Behaviour ==
The adults are flying mellivores. Flowering plants visited by the bees include Callistemon, Eucalyptus, Leptospermum and Melaleuca species.

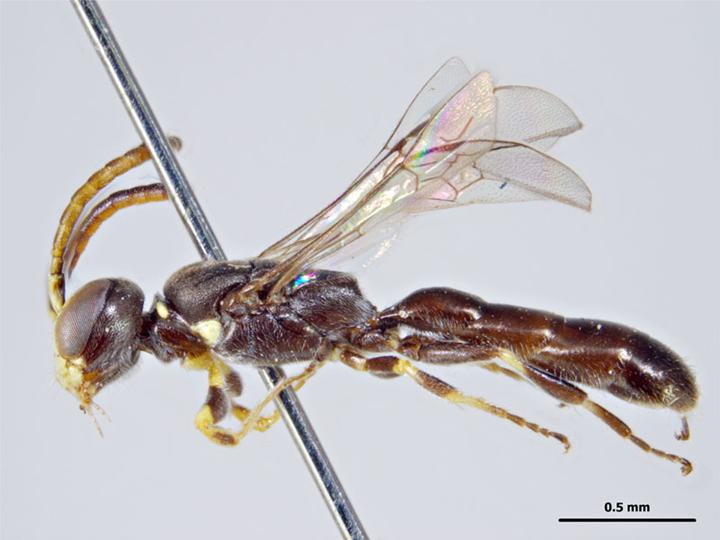
Male
