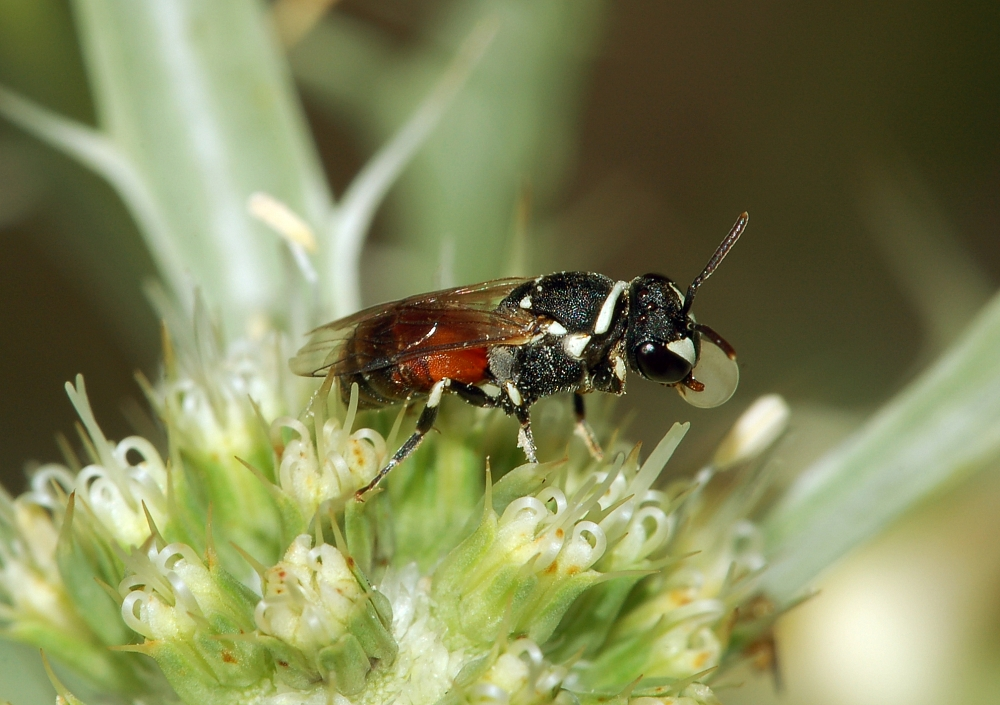
- Hylaeus sp.

Scientific classification
- Kingdom: Animalia
- Phylum: Arthropoda
- Clade: Pancrustacea
- Class: Insecta
- Order: Hymenoptera
- Family: Colletidae
- Subfamily: Hylaeinae
- Genus: Hylaeus; Fabricius, 1793

Subgenera(Ikudome, 1989)
- ~44

= Hylaeus (bee) =

Genus of insects

Hylaeus is a large (over 500 species) and diverse cosmopolitan genus within the bee family Colletidae. This genus is also known as the yellow-faced bees or masked bees. This genus is the only truly globally distributed colletid, occurring on all continents except Antarctica.

== Description ==
The genus of bees consists of generally small, black-and-yellow or black-and-white wasp-like species. The resemblance to wasps is enhanced by the absence of a scopa, which is atypical among bees. The body form of this genus is described as hylaeiform (slender); the hairs inconspicuous without magnification; and scopa inconspicuous or absent.

Males have an intermediate glossal shape with a small to distinct median apical glossal point.

Hylaeus carry pollen in the crop, rather than externally, and regurgitate it into the cell where it will be used as larval food. Like most colletids, the liquid provisions are sealed inside a membranous cellophane-like cell lining.

Nests are typically made in dead twigs or plant stems, or other similarly small natural cavities, rather than constructing or excavating their own nests as in many other bees.

Some species of Hylaeus have been associated with strong scents. In particular, European species such as Hylaeus prosopis are characterised by having a strong "lemon-like" scent. Further investigation has attributed this scent to a substance generated by the mandibular glands of both males and females, composed of neral and geranial. It is believed this substance is used as a defensive secretion and/or a social pheromone.

== Species ==
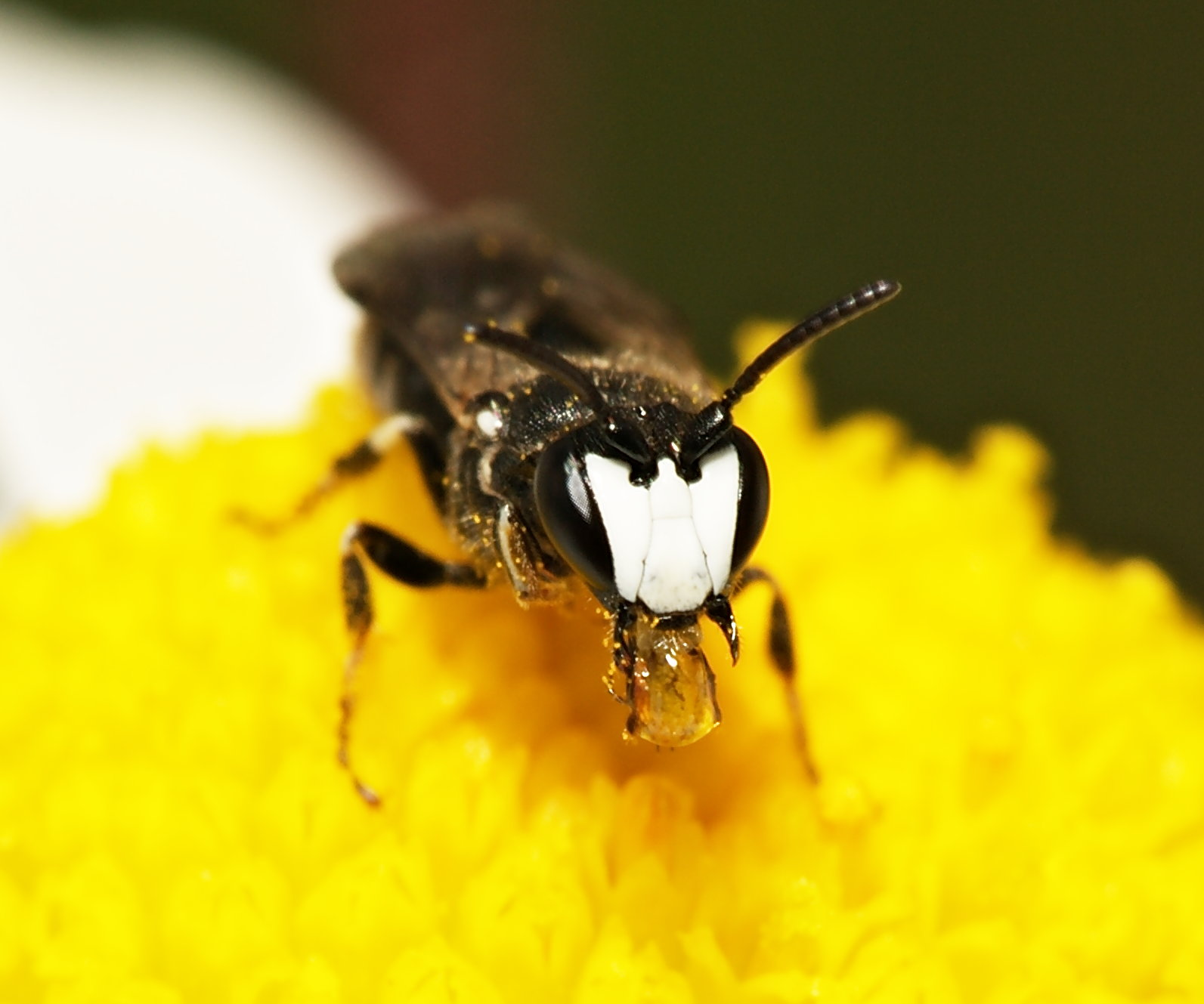
H. nigritus male

H. perhumilis - face of female

H. pictipes in flight

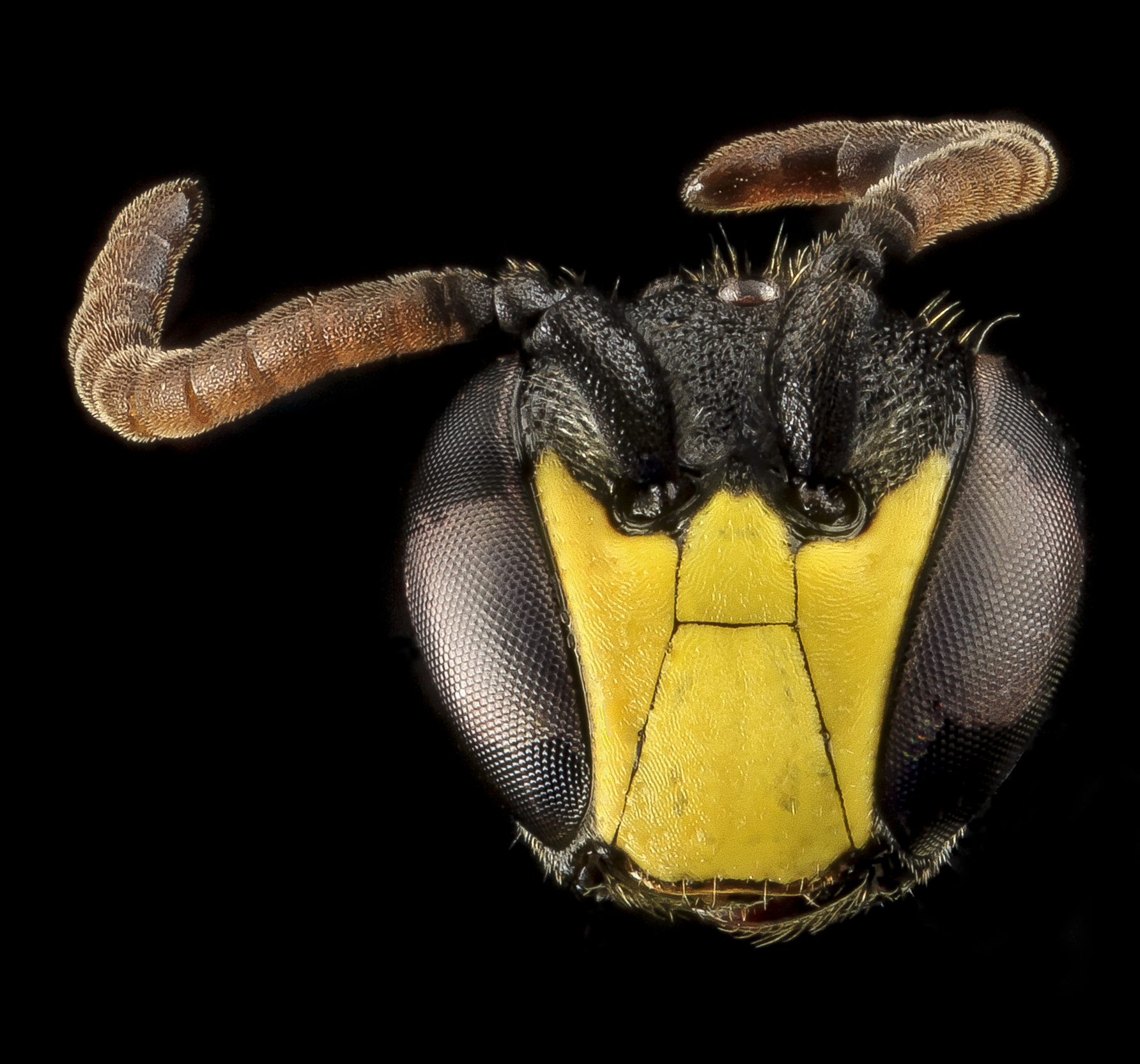
Face of H. modestus

Some selected species of Hylaeus are:

- Hylaeus agilis (Smith, 1876)
- Hylaeus alcyoneus (Erichson, 1842) - banksia bee
- Hylaeus anthracinus (Smith, 1853) – anthricinan yellow-faced bee
- Hylaeus assimulans (Perkins, 1899) – assimulans yellow-faced bee
- Hylaeus facilis (Smith, 1879) – easy yellow-faced bee
- Hylaeus hilaris (Smith, 1879) – hilaris yellow-faced bee
- Hylaeus kuakea Magnacca & Daly, 2003
- Hylaeus longiceps (Perkins, 1899) - longheaded yellow-faced bee
- Hylaeus mana Magnacca & Daly, 2003
- Hylaeus nigritus (Fabricius, 1798) - black-masked bee
- Hylaeus sanguinipictus (Cockerell, 1914)

For the full list, see:

- List of Hylaeus species

=== Subgenera ===
At least 44 subgenera of Hylaeus are known. These have been categorised geographically as follows by Ikudome (1989):

- Australasian Region (19 subgenera): Analastoroides, Edriohylaeus, Euprosopellus, Euprosopis, Euprosopoides, Gnathoprosopis, Gnathoprosopoides, Hylaeorhiza, Hylaeteron, Laccohylaeus, Macrohylaeus, Meghylaeus, Planihylaeus, Prosopisteroides, Prosopisteron, Pseudhylaeus, Rhodohylaeus, Spearhylaeus and Xenohylaeus.
- Palearctic Region (12 subgenera): Abrupta, Dentigera, Hylaeus, Koptogaster, Lambdopsis, Mehelyana, Nesohylaeus, Nesoprosopis, Paraprosopis, Patagiata, Prosopis and Spatulariella.
- Nearctic Region (7 subgenera): Cephalylaeus, Hylaeana, Hylaeus, Metziella, Paraprosopis, Prosopella and Prosopis.
- Holarctic Region (3 subgenera): Hylaeus, Paraprosopis and Prosopis.
- Oriental Region (5 subgenera): Gnathlaeus, Hoploprosopis, Nesoprosopis, Nesylaeus and Paraprosopis.
- Ethiopian Region (4 subgenera): Alfkenylaeus, Cornylaeus, Deranchylaeus and Metylaeus.
- Neotropical Region (4 subgenera): Gongyloprosopis, Hylaeana, Hylaeopsis and Prosopis.

== Distribution and status ==
A significant diversity of Hylaeus is found in Hawaii — approximately 64 species are recorded as living there. Hylaeus are the only bees considered native to the islands and most of those are unique to the island chain; the diversity of this genus is far greater in Hawaii than in all of mainland North America. Many of them are species of concern, and some recorded there are possibly extinct. For example, H. finitimus was last collected 100 years ago, and only ever seen on the island of Kauaʻi.

The Hawaiian bee population and diversity is somewhat fluid — within the past ten to twenty years several Hylaeus species have been found and identified on the islands as new to science. In October 2016, seven species were officially listed as endangered by U. S. Fish & Wildlife, the first bees to ever be placed on the endangered species list.

=== North America ===
==== Canada ====
There are 20 recorded species of Hylaeus in Canada, and an estimated 30 different species based on DNA barcoding. There are multiple reasons that extra species may not currently be recorded: colour markings and variations have been traditional identifiers leading to multiple junior synonyms, this genus is easily established outside of its native range, and heteroplasmy is known in some Hylaeus species which can lead to difficulties with specimen identification.

==== USA ====
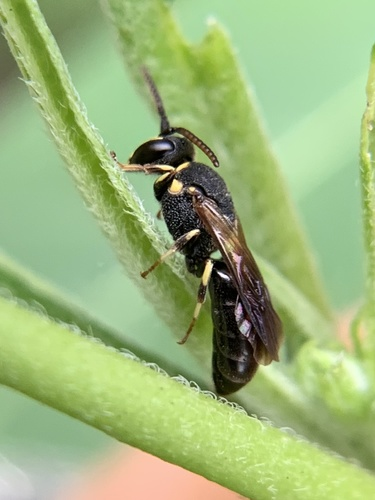
A Schwarz's Masked Bee (Hylaeus schwarzii) observed foraging in Coconut Creek, Florida

There are currently an estimated 130 species of Hylaeus in the USA.

Several species have been accidentally introduced to the USA. This includes: Hylaeus leptocephalus found throughout the country; Hylaeus hyalinatus found in urban New York, New Jersey and Pennsylvania; Hylaeus punctatus found in central California, Mid-Atlantic states, the Chicago region and Denver area; and Hylaeus (Prosopis) variegates in the greater New York city region.

One masked bee of interest in the country is Hylaeus lunicraterius. This bee is only recorded at the Craters of the Moon National Monument, Idaho. Little is known about its biology, however it is believed to nest in the crevices and holes in the lava flows.

=== Oceania ===
==== Hawaiian Islands ====
A single clade of 64 known Hylaeus spp. are native to Hawaii.

Phylogenetic evidence suggests that the first Hylaeus species arrived on the island of Hawaiʻi between 0.5 and 0.4 million years ago. From here, it is believed that descendants of the initial (presumed ground-nesting) colonist separated in order to specialize in the different ecological niches available. This included coastal and dry forest strands (H. longiceps and H. anthracinus); mid-elevation and montane dry shrubland strands (H. difficilis); kleptoparasite strands (H. inquilina); and wet and mesic forest wood-nesters. After this divergence, it is believed dispersal to other Hawaiian Islands occurred.

It is likely that the rapid speciation of Hylaeus occurred due to open expansion into open niches in novel habitat. Using an equation (r=lnN/t) developed by other studies into the evolution of Hawaiian groups, it can be calculated that the minimum speciation rate for Hylaeus on the island of Hawaiʻi is 9.23 species per million years.

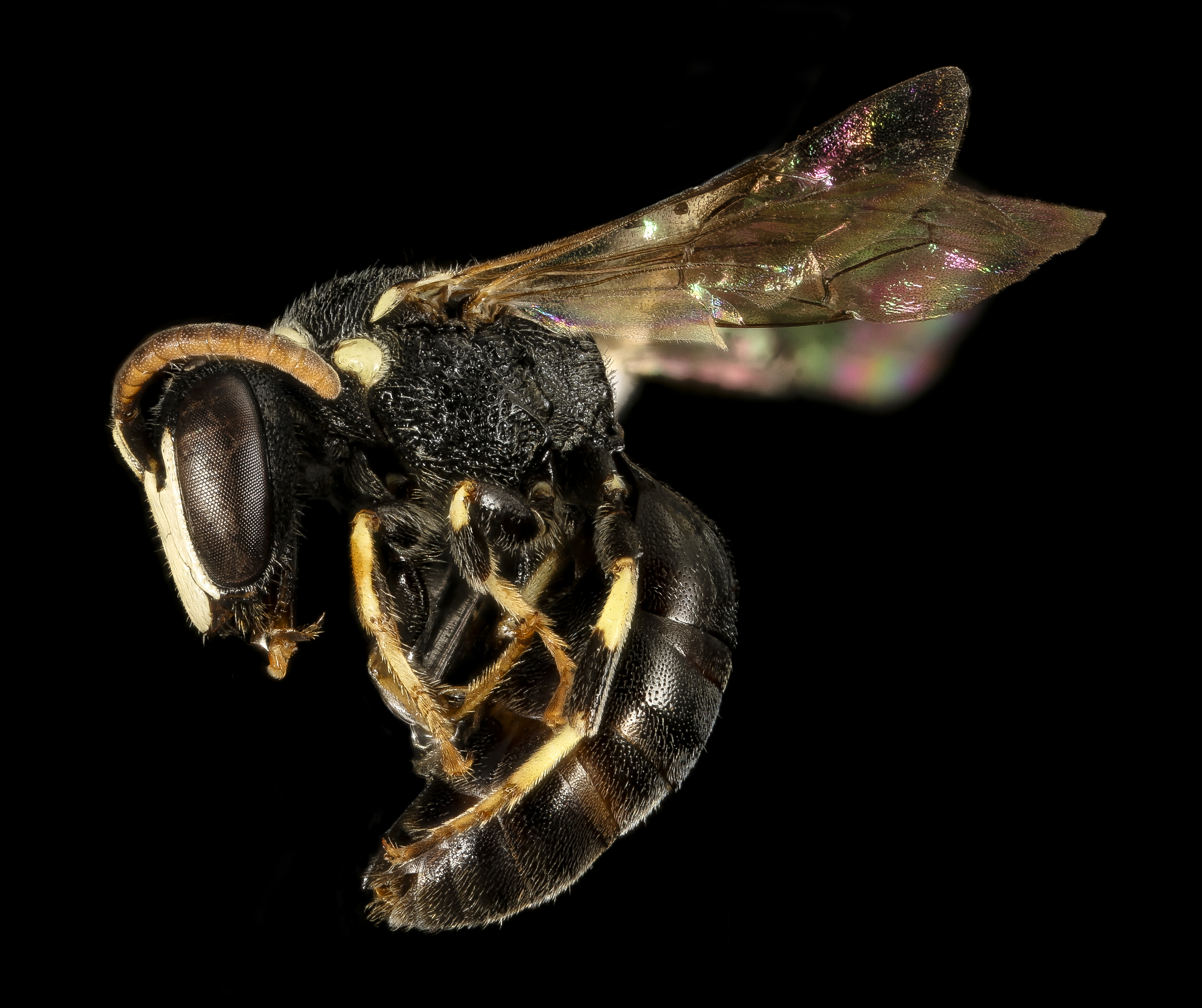
Hylaeus leptocephalus

In terms of nesting biology, those that inhabit wet areas nest in stems or wood, while those inhabiting dry areas nest in the ground. Some ground-nesting species are also known to nest in crevices under rocks or within rock walls. Kleptoparasitic species appear to only attack ground or crevice nesters. Hylaeus species lack features required for digging or excavation; instead, it is likely that the holes they inhabit were initiated by other insects (such as Plagithmysus beetles or Ectemnius wasps).

In 2024 a new species, Hylaeus paumako, was discovered on the island Molokaʻi.

Hawaiian Hylaeus species include five known kleptoparasitic species. These are the only known kleptoparasitic colletids.

=== Australasia ===
==== New Zealand ====
8 species of Hylaeus are known in New Zealand. All of these species belong to the subgenus Prosopisteron. 6 of these species are endemic.

Endemic species of Hylaeus are divided into two groups based on a distinctive feature: the form of the apex of the 8th metasomal sternum of males. Hylaeus agilis and H. capitosus have a rounded apex, while H. kermadecensis, H. matamoko, H. murihiku and H. relegatus have a bifid (deeply notched) apex. Two species are adventive from Australia: Hylaeus asperithorax and H. perhumilis.

H. agilis has been recorded nesting in a wide variety of pre-made holes in stems and wood, for example in Muehlenbeckia australis and Ripogonum scandens, as well as introduced blackberry. Widespread throughout the three main islands, females are known to be aggressive pollen and/or nectar seekers, and have been observed on yellow mistletoe (Alepis flavida) and red mistletoe (Peraxilla tetrapetala).

H. asperithorax is found on the three main islands of New Zealand, as well as the Three Kings Islands and the Chicken Islands, Somes Island, and the Chatham Islands. Host plants are a mix of native plants (for example, Wahlenbergia pygmaea and Veronica speciosa) and introduced plants such as the common dandelion.

H. kermadecensis is restricted to the Kermadec Islands. H. kermadecensis has two known host plants: the native Scaevola gracilis and the introduced flossflower (Ageratum houstonianum). This species is also known to nest in previously excavated holes in wood and stems, and has been found using anobiid tunnels. It has been observing nesting in the trunk of Myrsine kermadecensis.

H. matamoko is a South Island species, found in mid- to southern montane areas. Host plants associated with these species include native Hebe spp., Epilobium spp. and Myosotis spp.

H. murihiku is also a South Island species, with specimens being collected from Fiordland. Little is currently known about biological behaviour and habits of the species.

H. perhumilis inhabits both the North and South Island. This species once again occupies pre-made holes to nest, and have been collected from both borer holes as well as those found in structures such as buildings and benches. Their host plants are known to be introduced Banksia spp and Eucalyptus regnans.

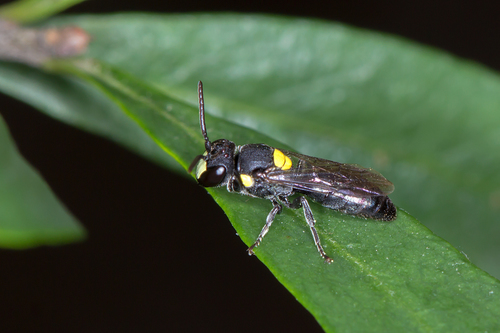
A male round-headed masked bee (Hylaeus rotundiceps) observed in Seymour, Australia.

H. relegatus is widespread throughout the 3 main islands of New Zealand, and also the Chatham Islands and Three Kings Islands. They are known to utilise a wide range of both native and introduced plants across their range. They also utilise pre-excavated holes in wood and stems to nest, including those found in weatherboards and planking. Nests have been known to be parasitized by Gasteruption spp and Coelopencyrtus australis. Prepupae have also been recorded being attacked by Melittobia spp, and immature bees have been recorded as being killed by mould mites (Tyrophagus putrescentiae).

==== Australia ====
There are 173 species of Hylaeus found in Australia. 14 out of 16 sugenera of Hylaeus found in Australia are endemic.

Phylogenetic data currently suggests that Hylaeus originates from Australia, arising around 30 million years ago. One dispersal event would have led to the species found in New Zealand, and another separate dispersal event leading to the worldwide distribution of species found outside Australasia, with both these events having occurred between 22 and 23 million years ago.

===== Subgenera found in Australia =====
The Australian Faunal Directory lists 20 subgenera as being found in Australia:

- Hylaeus (Analastoroides) Rayment, 1950: Hylaeus foveatus (Rayment, 1950)
- Hylaeus (Edriohylaeus) Michener, 1965: Hylaeus ofarrelli Michener, 1965
- Hylaeus (Euprosopellus) Michener, 1965: Hylaeus certus (Cockerell, 1921); Hylaeus chrysaspis (Cockerell, 1910); Hylaeus dromedarius (Cockerell, 1910); Hylaeus pergibbosus Cockerell, 1926
- Hylaeus (Euprosopis) Perkins, 1912: Hylaeus disjunctus (Cockerell, 1905); Hylaeus elegans (Smith, 1853); Hylaeus honestus (Smith, 1879); Hylaeus husela (Cockerell, 1910); Hylaeus violaceus (Smith, 1853)
- Hylaeus (Euprosopoides) Michener, 1965: Hylaeus amatus (Cockerell, 1909); Hylaeus cyanurus (W. Kirby, 1802); Hylaeus lubbocki (Cockerell, 1905); Hylaeus musgravei Cockerell, 1929; Hylaeus obtusatus (Smith, 1879); Hylaeus perplexus (Smith, 1854); Hylaeus rotundiceps (Smith, 1879); Hylaeus ruficeps (Smith, 1853)
- Hylaeus (Gephyrohylaeus) Michener, 1965: Hylaeus sculptus (Cockerell, 1911)
- Hylaeus (Gnathoprosopis) Perkins, 1912: Hylaeus albonitens (Cockerell, 1905); Hylaeus amiculiformis (Cockerell, 1909); Hylaeus amiculinus (Cockerell, 1922); Hylaeus amiculus (Smith, 1879); Hylaeus chromaticus (Cockerell, 1912); Hylaeus euxanthus (Cockerell, 1910); Hylaeus theodorei (Perkins, 1912)
- Hylaeus (Gnathoprosopoides) Michener, 1965: Hylaeus bituberculatus (Smith, 1879); Hylaeus philoleucus (Cockerell, 1910)
- Hylaeus (Heterapoides) Sandhouse, 1943: Hylaeus bacillarius (Cockerell, 1914); Hylaeus delicatus (Cockerell, 1911); Hylaeus digitatus (Houston, 1975); Hylaeus exleyae (Houston, 1975); Hylaeus extensus (Cockerell, 1916); Hylaeus halictiformis (Perkins, 1912); Hylaeus leviceps (Houston, 1975); Hylaeus nigriconcavus (Houston, 1975)
- Hylaeus (Hylaeorhiza) Michener, 1965: Hylaeus nubilosus (Smith, 1853)
- Hylaeus (Hylaeteron) Michener, 1965: Hylaeus douglasi Michener, 1965; Hylaeus hemirhodus Michener, 1965; Hylaeus murrumbidgeanus Houston, 1981; Hylaeus riekianus Houston, 1981; Hylaeus semirufus (Cockerell, 1914)
- Hylaeus (Laccohylaeus) Houston, 1981: Hylaeus cyanophilus (Cockerell, 1910)
- Hylaeus (Macrohylaeus) Michener, 1965: Hylaeus alcyoneus (Erichson, 1842)
- Hylaeus (Meghylaeus) Cockerell, 1929: Hylaeus fijiensis (Cockerell, 1909)
- Hylaeus (Planihylaeus) Houston, 1981: Hylaeus daviesiae Houston, 1981; Hylaeus jacksoniae Houston, 1981; Hylaeus probligenatus Houston, 1981; Hylaeus quadriceps (Smith, 1879); Hylaeus trilobatus (Cockerell, 1910)
- Hylaeus (Prosopisteron) Cockerell, 1906: Hylaeus accipitris (Cockerell, 1914); Hylaeus albozebratus Michener, 1965; Hylaeus amatulus (Cockerell, 1922); Hylaeus aralis (Cockerell, 1916); Hylaeus asperithorax (Rayment, 1927); Hylaeus auriferus (Cockerell, 1918); Hylaeus basilautus (Rayment, 1953); Hylaeus baudinensis (Cockerell, 1905); Hylaeus bicoloratus (Smith, 1853); Hylaeus bicuneatus (Cockerell, 1910); Hylaeus bidentatus (Smith, 1853); Hylaeus blanchae Rayment, 1953; Hylaeus brevior (Cockerell, 1918); Hylaeus burnsi (Michener, 1965); Hylaeus chlorosomus (Cockerell, 1913); Hylaeus cliffordiellus Rayment, 1953; Hylaeus crassifemoratus (Cockerell, 1922); Hylaeus cyaneomicans (Cockerell, 1910); Hylaeus distractus (Cockerell, 1914); Hylaeus elongatus (Smith, 1879); Hylaeus eugeniellus (Cockerell, 1910); Hylaeus flavojugatus (Cockerell, 1912); Hylaeus frederici (Cockerell, 1905); Hylaeus greavesi (Rayment, 1935); Hylaeus hobartiellus Cockerell, 1929; Hylaeus infans (Cockerell, 1910); Hylaeus leai (Cockerell, 1912); Hylaeus littleri (Cockerell, 1918); Hylaeus mediovirens (Cockerell, 1913); Hylaeus microphenax (Cockerell, 1910); Hylaeus minusculus (Cockerell, 1913); Hylaeus murrayensis Rayment, 1935; Hylaeus nigrescens (Cockerell, 1918); Hylaeus perhumilis (Cockerell, 1914); Hylaeus perpictus Rayment, 1935; Hylaeus pictulus Michener, 1965; Hylaeus primulipictus (Cockerell, 1905); Hylaeus procurvus (Rayment, 1939); Hylaeus quadratus (Smith, 1853); Hylaeus sanguinipictus (Cockerell, 1914); Hylaeus scintillans (Cockerell, 1922); Hylaeus scintilliformis (Cockerell, 1913); Hylaeus scintillus (Cockerell, 1912); Hylaeus semipersonatus Cockerell, 1929; Hylaeus serotinellus (Cockerell, 1906); Hylaeus simplus Houston, 1993; Hylaeus subcoronatus Rayment, 1935; Hylaeus trimerops (Cockerell, 1916); Hylaeus turgicollaris Michener, 1965; Hylaeus vittatifrons (Cockerell, 1913); Hylaeus wilsoni (Rayment, 1928); Hylaeus woyensis Rayment, 1939; Hylaeus wynyardensis Cockerell, 1929; Hylaeus xanthaspis (Cockerell, 1910); Hylaeus xanthognathus Rayment, 1935; Hylaeus xanthopsyche (Cockerell, 1922)
- Hylaeus (Pseudhylaeus) Cockerell, 1929: Hylaeus albocuneatus (Cockerell, 1913); Hylaeus albomaculatus (Smith, 1879); Hylaeus hypoleucus (Cockerell, 1918); Hylaeus mirandus (Rayment, 1930); Hylaeus multigibbosus Michener, 1965;
- Hylaeus (Rhodohylaeus) Michener, 1965
- Hylaeus (Sphaerhylaeus) Cockerell, 1929
- Hylaeus (Xenohylaeus) Michener, 1965

=== Asia ===
==== China ====
21 species have been formally identified and described in China. These are as follows: Hylaeus (Dentigera) luna, Hylaeus asiaticus, Hylaeus difformis, Hylaeus dolichocephalus, Hylaeus dorni, Hylaeus fuliginosus, Hylaeus mongolicus, Hylaeus niger, Hylaeus paulus, Hylaeus perforatus, Hylaeus potanini, Hylaeus przewalskyi, Hylaeus sibiricus, Hylaeus sinensis, Hylaeus medialis, Hylaeus pfankuchi, Hylaeus floralis, Hylaeus concinnus, Hylaeus nigricallosus, Hylaeus confusus and Hylaeus variegatus.

==== Japan ====
23 species of Hylaeus are formally identified in Japan.

==== Saudi Arabia ====
Only one species of Hylaeus has been formally recorded in Saudi Arabia - Hylaeus (Paraprosopis) albonotatus. Further surveying of bee fauna is likely to result in further groups being recorded, due to the close proximity of numerous other species and subgenera of Hylaeus.

== Ecology ==
=== Nesting Biology ===
Hylaeus nests in premade holes and prefers to nest in wood, but will nest in dead stems, rocks, and earthworm burrows.

When a suitable premade hole is found, it is then divided by transverse partitions of clear cellophane-like material. The inner most cell is the one farthest from the nest entrance, and is characterised by a round distal end in order to fit the hole. Cell volumes are more or less constant. Lateral burrows are not constructed in this genus, but cells are placed end to end in the main nest.

Hylaeus lines their nest with a waterproof and contaminant proof clear cellophane substance that does not melt or dissolve with strong chemicals. They also secrete a substance that protects the nest from fungi and bacteria. This substance is secreted from the mandibles.

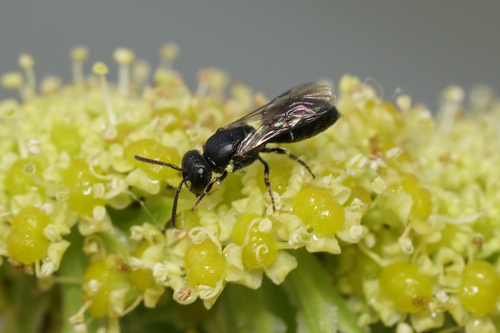
A female Little Masked Bee (Hylaeus pictipes) observed foraging on lovage in Ohio.

Food mass placed in cells is liquid, even watery in some cases. It fills the bottom part of the water-proof cells. This liquid state is due a relatively small amount of pollen deposited in it from the crop. This pollen is then placed in a nectar admixture.

=== Diet and Feeding ===
Females gather large amounts of nectar for their semi-liquid provisions, and males feed on nectar. Observations suggest that Hylaeus are specialized in terms of pollen they collect, and near exclusively line their cells with pollen from plants they are specially adapted to. Pollen is carried internally in the crop.

Pollen-grooming movements by this genus to get pollen to the mouth only take pollen from the head and forelegs, with pollen on other parts of the body being lost. It is thought that the internal method of carrying pollen via the crop is an ancestral trait compared to scopal transport that other bees perform.

=== Pollination ===
The genus does not possess the same external structures as most other bee species and therefore instead transports pollen and nectar in the crop whilst foraging instead of externally. This makes for an interesting question of whether the species is an effective pollinator as the relative importance of their role as pollinators is unknown.

Hylaeus are considered generalist species, foraging on multiple species but have been documented to frequently visit specific plants within their established area. They forage at a high rate of visitation on many plant species and are considered to be an important contributor to pollination.

As this species lacks the external features to collect pollen, they pollinate other flowers when they insert their heads into deep throated flowers to harvest pollen and nectar. This results in excess pollen gathering around their head and thorax on their plumose hairs in which they transport to other flowers. These physical attributes raise concerns regarding their effectiveness as pollinators as they are unable to carry the same amount of pollen as other bee species and have been observed not coming into contact with the stigmas to effectively pollinate flowers, thus resulting in pollen theft. Additionally, the Hylaeus forage within short distances of their burrows ultimately resulting in pollen limitations within their environment. To alleviate this issue and increase their foraging efficiency, they specialise with particular species of plants for short periods of time however, when comparing their pollination effectiveness to other pollinator species like the ant, the Hylaeus is not as effective.

Contrastingly, a study involving pollination rates within the species Hylaeus matamoko in alpine areas of New Zealand, depicted a significant increase in pollination rate per visit when comparing to other invertebrate pollinators. It is estimated that the species performs 90-95% of the pollination within the alpine area studied with the Hylaeus also making up approximately 90% of foraging activities within their local environment.

Multiple literary sources indicate that further studies regarding their pollination effectiveness should be performed for each individual species and their respective global locations to determine if pollination rates change within species and to investigate the effectiveness of the genus as a pollinator.

== Conservation ==
Nearly half of the Hylaeus species found in Hawaii are under threat, primarily due to loss and alteration of habitats. An estimated 10 species of Hylaeus may already be extinct in the Hawaiian Islands.

Hylaeus hirsutulus from Kauaʻi; H. angustulus from Maui Nui; H. kukui from Maui and Hawaiʻi island; H. crabronoides, H. filicum, H. muranus (= insignis), and H. rugulosus from Hawaiʻi; and H. specularis from Hawaiʻi, Molokaʻi, Oʻahu, and Kauaʻi (and presumedly Maui) all have only been collected and recorded in low numbers. These populations may potentially be under threat, however also exist in relatively large areas, and so may exist in larger populations than currently known. These species require further investigation to conclusively determine their status.

In the past 30 years, only three specimens of Hylaeus facilis have been collected from the Hawaiian Islands - one from Oʻahu in 1975, one from Maui in 1993, and one from Molokaʻi in 2005. Previous to 1930, this species had been described as widespread and abundant. It remains uncertain why these populations have decreased significantly while substantial habitat remains and closely related species remain abundant.

Hawaiian species H. anthracinus is known to be affected by the presence of invasive ant species, decreasing both nest success and the number of adults produced per successful nest. The black household ant (Ochetellus glaber) has been observed depredating nests, removing pollen, eggs, larvae and pupae. The African big-headed ant (Pheidole megacephala) can co-exist with H. anthracinus at low densities, however excludes them from ground-nesting opportunities when populations rise. In contrast, the yellow crazy ant (Anoplolepis gracilipes) is known to expand rapidly and remove this species from its range.

In Australia, the presence of commercial honey bees has been found to reduce the fecundity of the endemic Hylaeus alcyoneus, with 23% less nests being made when honey bees were present.
