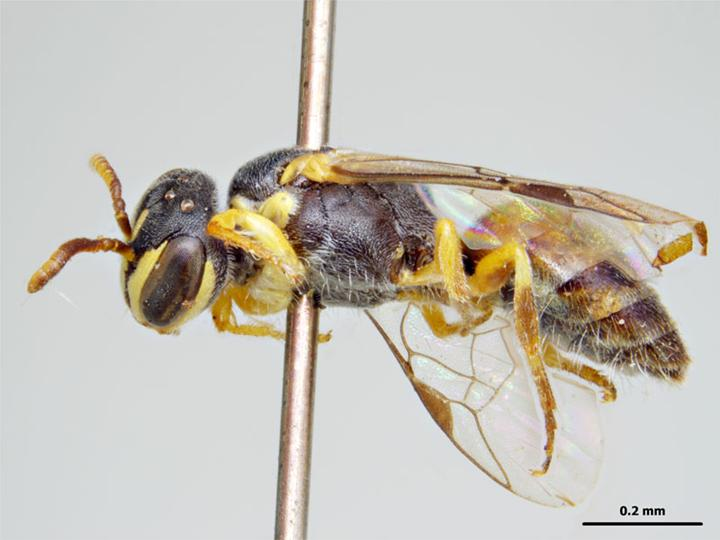
- Female

Scientific classification
- Kingdom: Animalia
- Phylum: Arthropoda
- Clade: Pancrustacea
- Class: Insecta
- Order: Hymenoptera
- Family: Colletidae
- Genus: Hylaeus
- Species: H. vittatifrons

Binomial name
- Hylaeus vittatifrons (Cockerell, 1913)

Synonyms
- Prosopis vittatifrons Cockerell, 1913

= Hylaeus vittatifrons =

Species of bee

Hylaeus vittatifrons, or Hylaeus (Prosopisteron) vittatifrons, is a species of bee in the family Colletidae and subfamily Hylaeinae. It is endemic to Australia. It was described by British-American entomologist Theodore Dru Alison Cockerell in 1913.

== Description ==
Female body length is about 4.5 mm, male body length just over 3 mm. Integumental colouration is mainly black, with cream to yellow markings.

== Distribution and habitat ==
The species occurs in southern Australia. The type locality is Purnong, South Australia. It has also been recorded from Perth.

== Behaviour ==
The adults are flying mellivores. Flowering plants visited by the bees include Calothamnus species.

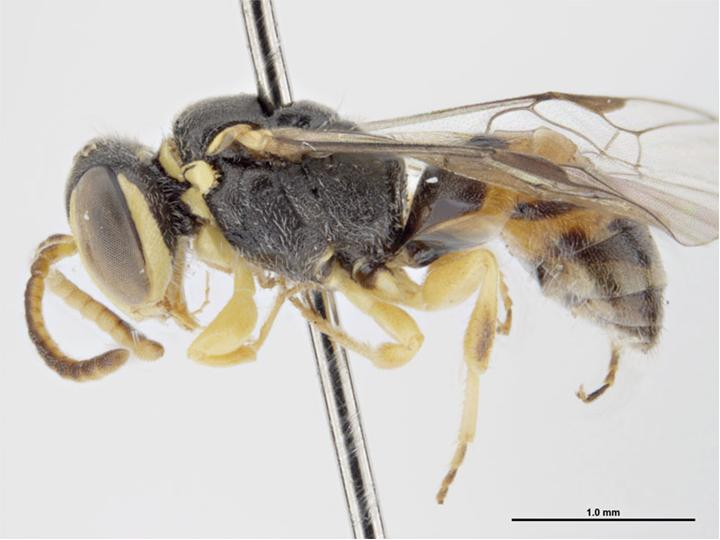
Male
