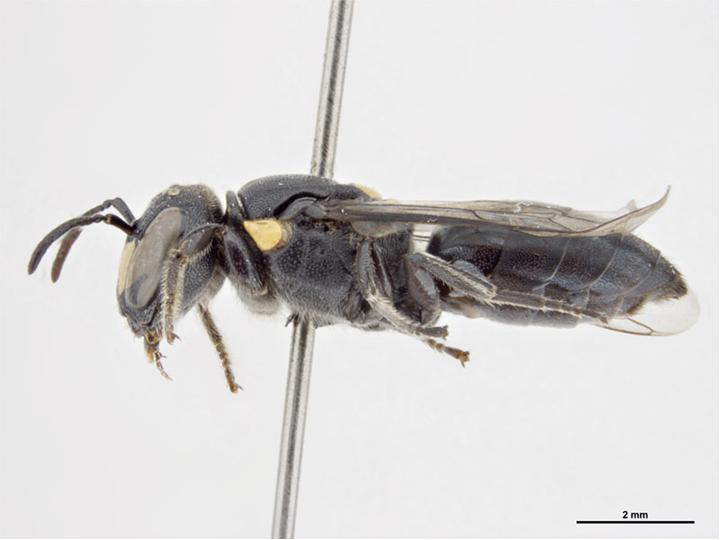
- Female

Scientific classification
- Kingdom: Animalia
- Phylum: Arthropoda
- Clade: Pancrustacea
- Class: Insecta
- Order: Hymenoptera
- Family: Colletidae
- Genus: Hylaeus
- Species: H. obtusatus

Binomial name
- Hylaeus obtusatus (Smith, 1879)

Synonyms
- Prosopis obtusata Smith, 1879; Hylaeus amatiformis Cockerell, 1929; Hylaeus (Euprosopoides) perconvergens Michener, 1965

= Hylaeus obtusatus =

Species of bee

Hylaeus obtusatus, or Hylaeus (Euprosopoides) obtusatus, also known as the obtuse masked bee, is a species of bee in the family Colletidae and subfamily Hylaeinae. It is endemic to Australia. It was described by English entomologist Frederick Smith in 1879.

== Distribution and habitat ==
The species occurs in south-west Western Australia. Type localities include Swan River, King George Sound and Bunbury.

== Behaviour ==
The adults are flying mellivores.

Obtuse masked bee (Hylaeus obtusatus)

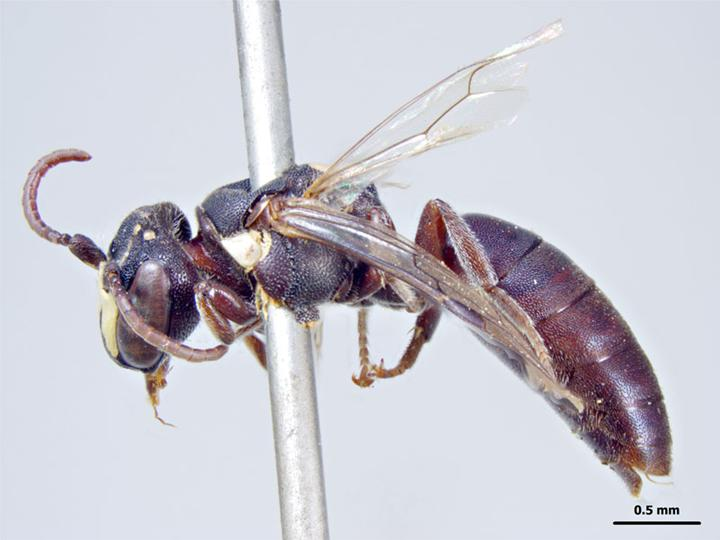
Male
