= Hylaeus accipitris =

Scientific classification
- Kingdom: Animalia
- Phylum: Arthropoda
- Clade: Pancrustacea
- Class: Insecta
- Order: Hymenoptera
- Family: Colletidae
- Genus: Hylaeus
- Species: H. accipitris

Binomial name
- Hylaeus accipitris (Cockerell, 1914)

Synonyms
- Prosopis accipitris Cockerell, 1914

Species of bee

Hylaeus accipitris, or Hylaeus (Prosopisteron) accipitris, is a species of bee in the family Colletidae and subfamily Hylaeinae. It is endemic to Australia. It was described by British-American entomologist Theodore Dru Alison Cockerell in 1914.

== Description ==
Male body length is about 5 mm. Integumental colouration is mainly black, with cream to yellow markings.

== Distribution and habitat ==
The species occurs in Tasmania. The type locality is Eaglehawk Neck.

== Behaviour ==
The adults are flying mellivores. Flowering plants visited by the bees include Eucalyptus species.
