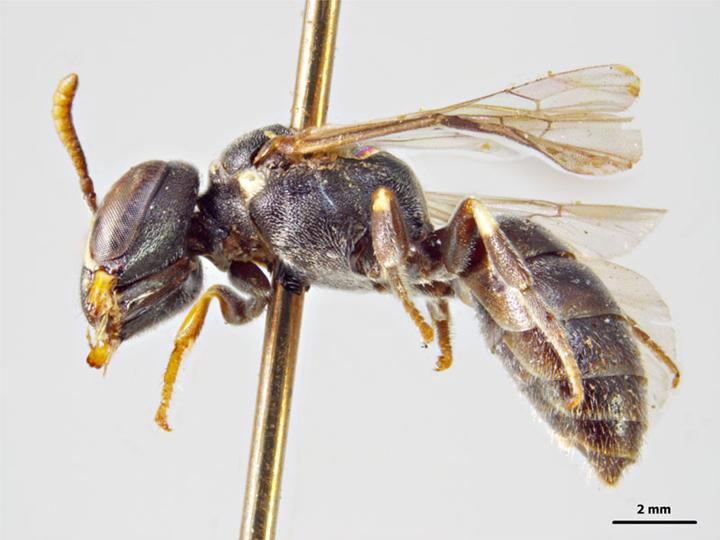
- Female

Scientific classification
- Kingdom: Animalia
- Phylum: Arthropoda
- Clade: Pancrustacea
- Class: Insecta
- Order: Hymenoptera
- Family: Colletidae
- Genus: Hylaeus
- Species: H. wilsoni

Binomial name
- Hylaeus wilsoni (Rayment, 1928)

Synonyms
- Euryglossa wilsoni Rayment, 1928

= Hylaeus wilsoni =

Species of bee

Hylaeus wilsoni, or Hylaeus (Prosopisteron) wilsoni, is a species of bee in the family Colletidae and subfamily Hylaeinae. It is endemic to Australia. It was described by Australian entomologist Tarlton Rayment in 1928.

== Etymology ==
The specific epithet wilsoni honours "...Mr. E. Wilson, the President of the Victorian Field Naturalists’ Club, who captured it on a Shirley Poppy, on the 7th day of February, 1928, at Melbourne, and has the type-specimen in his possession."

== Description ==
Male body length is about 4.5 mm. Integumental colouration is mainly black, with yellow markings.

== Distribution and habitat ==
The species occurs in south-eastern Australia. The type locality is Melbourne.

== Behaviour ==
The adults are flying mellivores. Flowering plants visited by the bees include Eucalyptus species.
