= Hylaeus scintillus =

Scientific classification
- Kingdom: Animalia
- Phylum: Arthropoda
- Clade: Pancrustacea
- Class: Insecta
- Order: Hymenoptera
- Family: Colletidae
- Genus: Hylaeus
- Species: H. scintillus

Binomial name
- Hylaeus scintillus (Cockerell, 1912)

Synonyms
- Prosopis scintilla Cockerell, 1912

Species of bee

Hylaeus scintillus, or Hylaeus (Prosopisteron) scintillus, is a species of bee in the family Colletidae and subfamily Hylaeinae. It is endemic to Australia. It was described by British-American entomologist Theodore Dru Alison Cockerell in 1912.

== Description ==
Female body length is about 4 mm. Integumental colouration is mainly black, with cream and reddish-brown markings.

== Distribution and habitat ==
The species occurs in eastern mainland Australia. The type locality is Mackay, Queensland. It has also been recorded from Brisbane.

== Behaviour ==
The adults are flying mellivores. Flowering plants visited by the bees include Leptospermum species.
