= Hylaeus xanthognathus =

Scientific classification
- Kingdom: Animalia
- Phylum: Arthropoda
- Clade: Pancrustacea
- Class: Insecta
- Order: Hymenoptera
- Family: Colletidae
- Genus: Hylaeus
- Species: H. xanthognathus

Binomial name
- Hylaeus xanthognathus Rayment, 1935

Species of bee

Hylaeus xanthognathus, or Hylaeus (Prosopisteron) xanthognathus, is a species of bee in the family Colletidae and subfamily Hylaeinae. It is endemic to Australia. It was described by Australian entomologist Tarlton Rayment in 1935.

== Description ==
Male body length is about 3.5 mm. Integumental colouration is mainly blackish-green, with yellow markings.

== Distribution and habitat ==
The species occurs in Victoria in south-eastern Australia. The type locality is Malvern.

== Behaviour ==
The adults are flying mellivores.
