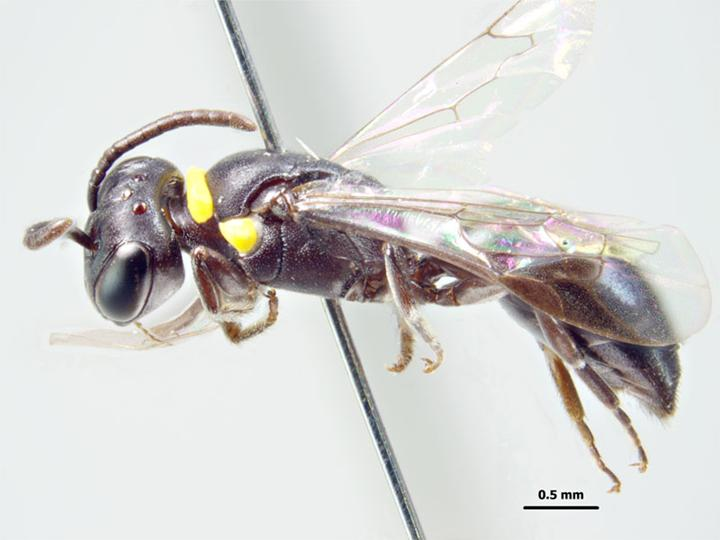
- Female

Scientific classification
- Kingdom: Animalia
- Phylum: Arthropoda
- Clade: Pancrustacea
- Class: Insecta
- Order: Hymenoptera
- Family: Colletidae
- Genus: Hylaeus
- Species: H. primulipictus

Binomial name
- Hylaeus primulipictus (Cockerell, 1905)

Synonyms
- Prosopis primulipicta Cockerell, 1905

= Hylaeus primulipictus =

Species of bee

Hylaeus primulipictus, or Hylaeus (Prosopisteron) primulipictus, is a species of bee in the family Colletidae and subfamily Hylaeinae. It is endemic to Australia. It was described by British-American entomologist Theodore Dru Alison Cockerell in 1905.

== Distribution and habitat ==
The species occurs in eastern Australia. The type locality is Mackay, Queensland. It has also been recorded from the Manning Valley in north-eastern New South Wales.

== Behaviour ==
The adults are flying mellivores.

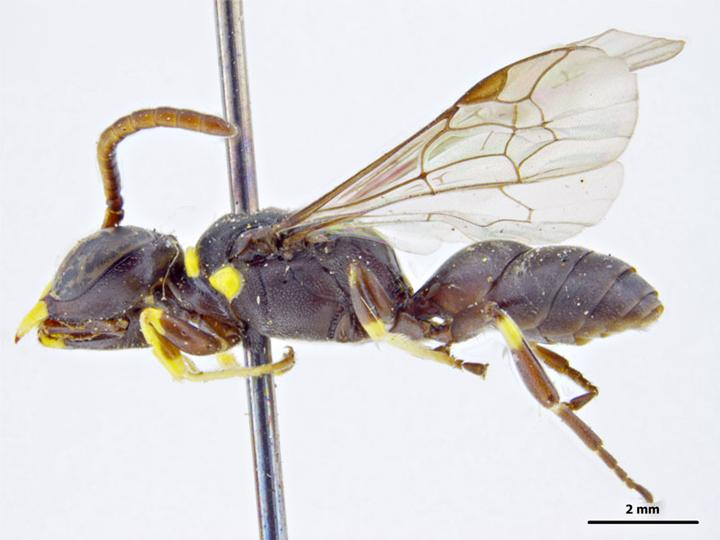
Male
