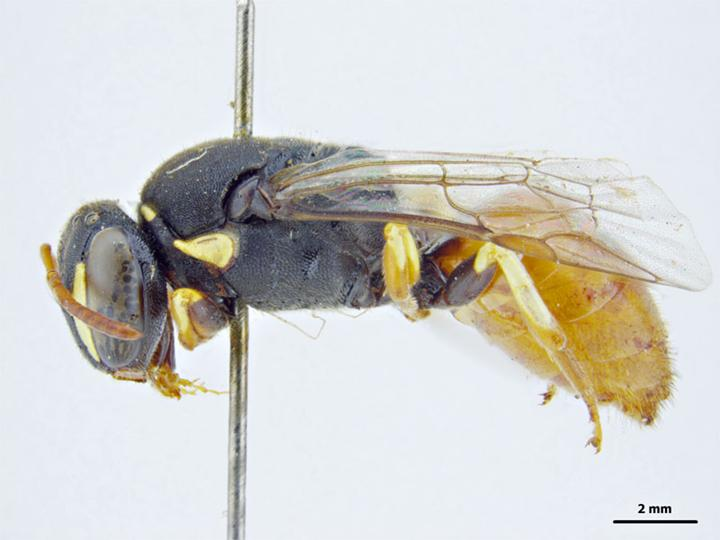
- Female

Scientific classification
- Kingdom: Animalia
- Phylum: Arthropoda
- Clade: Pancrustacea
- Class: Insecta
- Order: Hymenoptera
- Family: Colletidae
- Genus: Hylaeus
- Species: H. theodorei

Binomial name
- Hylaeus theodorei (Perkins, 1912)

Synonyms
- Gnathoprosopis theodorei Perkins, 1912

= Hylaeus theodorei =

Species of bee

Hylaeus theodorei, or Hylaeus (Gnathoprosopis) theodorei, is a species of bee in the family Colletidae and subfamily Hylaeinae. It is endemic to Australia. It was described by British entomologist Robert Cyril Layton Perkins in 1912.

== Description ==
Male body length is about 7 mm. Integumental colouration is mainly black, with yellow and reddish markings, the abdomen dark brown to fuscous.

== Distribution and habitat ==
The species occurs in north-eastern mainland Australia. The type locality is Townsville in North Queensland.

== Behaviour ==
The adults are flying mellivores. Flowering plants visited by the bees include Dendrobium, Eucalyptus and Melaleuca species.

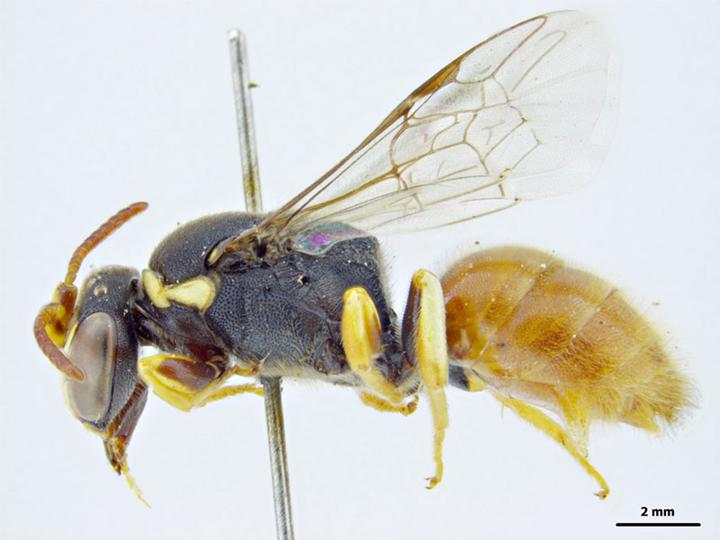
Male
