= Hylaeus xanthaspis =

Scientific classification
- Kingdom: Animalia
- Phylum: Arthropoda
- Clade: Pancrustacea
- Class: Insecta
- Order: Hymenoptera
- Family: Colletidae
- Genus: Hylaeus
- Species: H. xanthaspis

Binomial name
- Hylaeus xanthaspis (Cockerell, 1910)

Synonyms
- Prosopis xanthaspis Cockerell, 1910; Prosopis mackayensis Friese, 1924; Prosopis turneri Friese, 1924

Species of bee

Hylaeus xanthaspis, or Hylaeus (Prosopisteron) xanthaspis, is a species of bee in the family Colletidae and subfamily Hylaeinae. It is endemic to Australia. It was described by British-American entomologist Theodore Dru Alison Cockerell in 1910.

== Description ==
Female body length is about 7 mm. Integumental colouration is mainly black, with a chrome yellow scutellum.

== Distribution and habitat ==
The species occurs in north-eastern Australia. The type locality is Mackay, Queensland.

== Behaviour ==
The adults are flying mellivores. Flowering plants visited by the bees include Cassia and Eucalyptus species.
