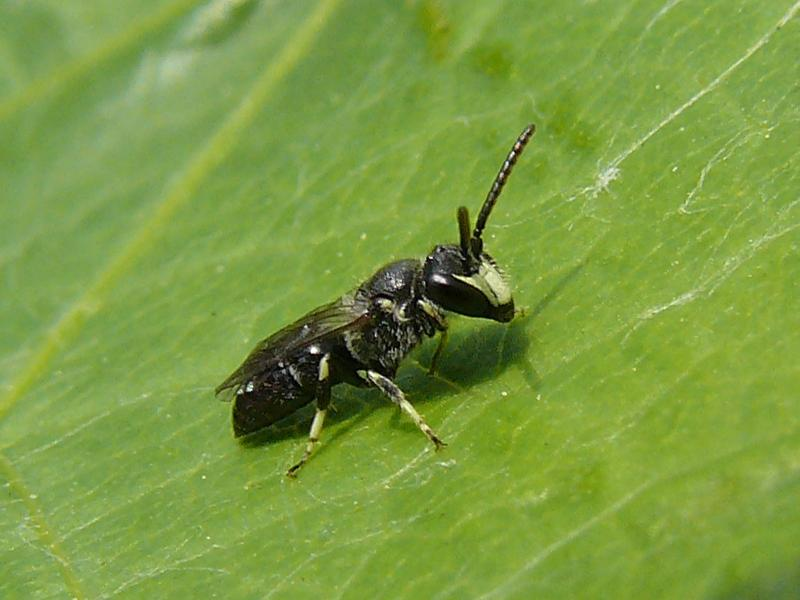

Scientific classification
- Kingdom: Animalia
- Phylum: Arthropoda
- Clade: Pancrustacea
- Class: Insecta
- Order: Hymenoptera
- Family: Colletidae
- Genus: Hylaeus
- Species: H. hyalinatus

Binomial name
- Hylaeus hyalinatus Smith, 1842

= Hylaeus hyalinatus =

Species of bee

Hylaeus hyalinatus is a species of hymenopteran in the family Colletidae. It can be found in Europe, including Great Britain. It is an invasive species in North America.
