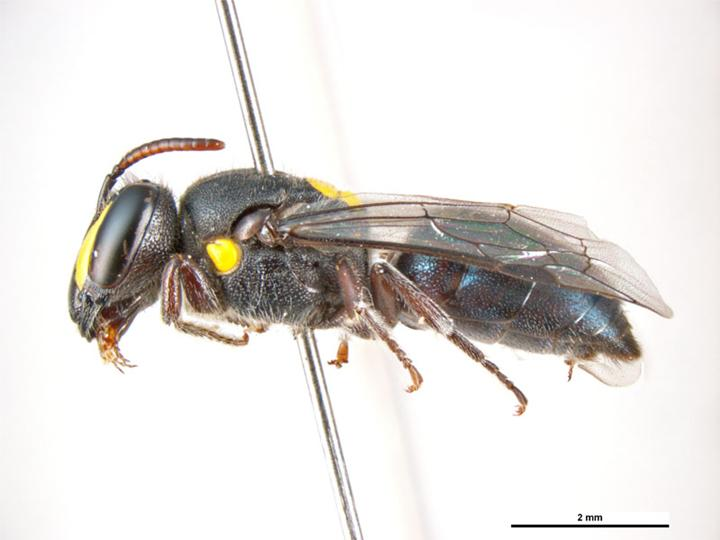
- Female

Scientific classification
- Kingdom: Animalia
- Phylum: Arthropoda
- Clade: Pancrustacea
- Class: Insecta
- Order: Hymenoptera
- Family: Colletidae
- Genus: Hylaeus
- Species: H. violaceus

Binomial name
- Hylaeus violaceus (Smith, 1853)

Synonyms
- Prosopis violaceus Smith, 1853; Prosopis cognata Smith, 1879; Hylaeus gosfordensis Rayment, 1939

= Hylaeus violaceus =

Species of bee

Hylaeus violaceus, or Hylaeus (Euprosopis) violaceus, is a species of bee in the family Colletidae and subfamily Hylaeinae. It is endemic to Australia. It was described by English entomologist Frederick Smith in 1853.

== Distribution and habitat ==
The species occurs across much of southern mainland Australia. Type localities include Swan River and Geraldton in Western Australia, and Gosford, New South Wales.

== Behaviour ==
The adults are flying mellivores. Flowering plants visited by the bees include Banksia, Eucalyptus, Bursaria, Leptospermum and Melaleuca species.

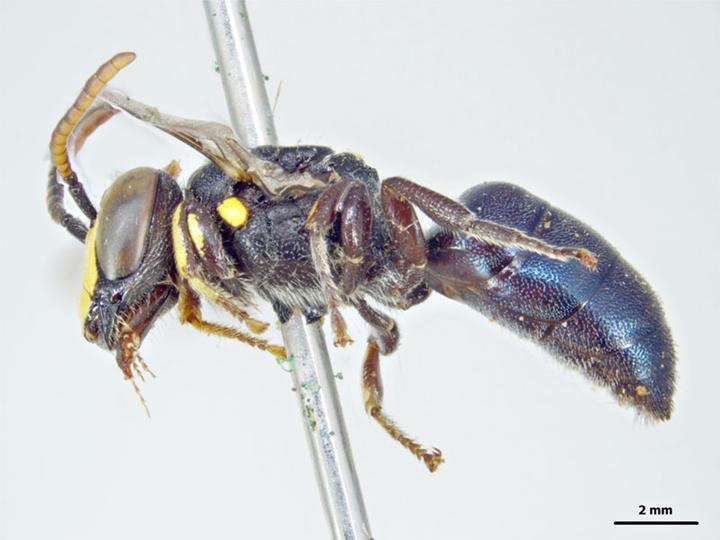
Male
