= Hylaeus leai =

Scientific classification
- Kingdom: Animalia
- Phylum: Arthropoda
- Clade: Pancrustacea
- Class: Insecta
- Order: Hymenoptera
- Family: Colletidae
- Genus: Hylaeus
- Species: H. leai

Binomial name
- Hylaeus leai (Cockerell, 1912)

Synonyms
- Prosopis leai Cockerell, 1912

Species of bee

Hylaeus leai, or Hylaeus (Prosopisteron) leai, is a species of bee in the family Colletidae and subfamily Hylaeinae. It is endemic to Australia. It was described by British-American entomologist Theodore Dru Alison Cockerell in 1912.

== Description ==
Male body length is about 6.5 mm. Integumental colouration is mainly black, with yellow markings.

== Distribution and habitat ==
The species occurs in eastern mainland Australia. The type locality is Royal National Park, Sydney.

== Behaviour ==
The adults are flying mellivores.
