= Hylaeus wynyardensis =

Scientific classification
- Kingdom: Animalia
- Phylum: Arthropoda
- Clade: Pancrustacea
- Class: Insecta
- Order: Hymenoptera
- Family: Colletidae
- Genus: Hylaeus
- Species: H. wynyardensis

Binomial name
- Hylaeus wynyardensis Cockerell, 1929

Species of bee

Hylaeus wynyardensis, or Hylaeus (Prosopisteron) wynyardensis, is a species of bee in the family Colletidae and subfamily Hylaeinae. It is endemic to Australia. It was described by British-American entomologist Theodore Dru Alison Cockerell in 1929.

== Description ==
Female body length is about 6 mm. Integumental colouration is mainly black, with yellow markings.

== Distribution and habitat ==
The species occurs in Tasmania. The type locality is Wynyard.

== Behaviour ==
The adults are flying mellivores.
