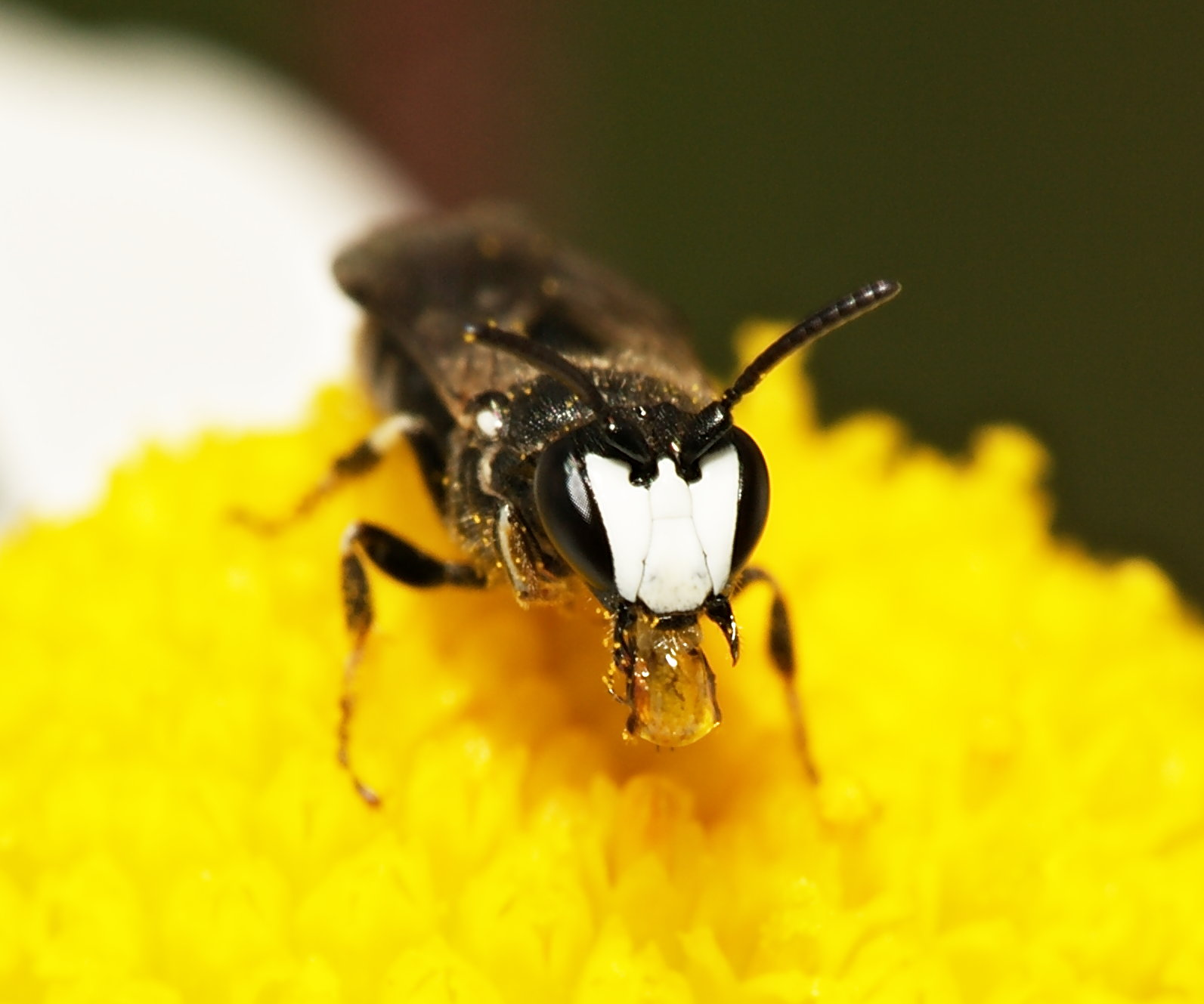
- Hylaeus nigritus, male

Scientific classification
- Kingdom: Animalia
- Phylum: Arthropoda
- Clade: Pancrustacea
- Class: Insecta
- Order: Hymenoptera
- Family: Colletidae
- Genus: Hylaeus
- Species: H. nigritus

Binomial name
- Hylaeus nigritus (Fabricius, 1798)

Synonyms
- • Hylaeus propinquus (Nylander, 1852) • Mellinus nigritus (Fabricius, 1798)

= Hylaeus nigritus =

Species of solitary bee native to much of Europe

Hylaeus nigritus, also known as the black masked bee, is a species of solitary bee native to much of Europe, with sightings and preserved specimens recorded as far east as Nizhny Novgorod, Russia and the Caucasus.

== Description ==
The black masked bee is average sized compared to other members of Hylaeus, measuring 8 to 10 mm in length. Males are mostly black with a distinctive white face while females are entirely black.

== Distribution and habitat ==
Recorded sightings of the black masked bee extend across Europe and into Russia, with preserved specimens found in the Caucasus. Not much is known about the species' specific habitat or behavior.
