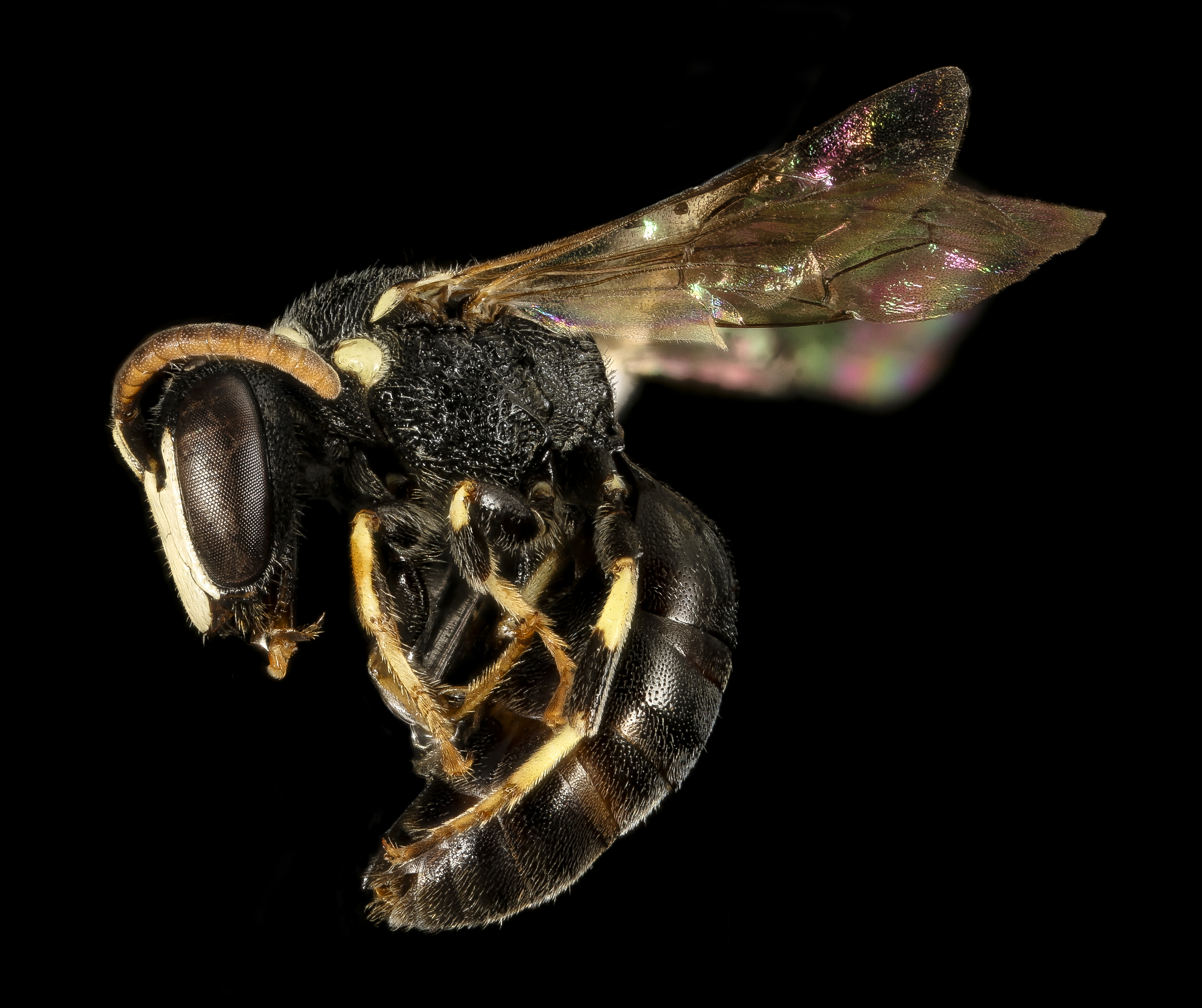

Scientific classification
- Kingdom: Animalia
- Phylum: Arthropoda
- Clade: Pancrustacea
- Class: Insecta
- Order: Hymenoptera
- Family: Colletidae
- Genus: Hylaeus
- Species: H. leptocephalus

Binomial name
- Hylaeus leptocephalus (Morawitz, 1870)

Synonyms
- Hylaeus bisinuatus Förster, 1871

= Hylaeus leptocephalus =

Species of bee

Hylaeus leptocephalus is a species of hymenopteran in the family Colletidae. It is native to the Palearctic but can, since 1912, also be found in North America.
