= Hylaeus facilis =

Conservation status
- Endangered (ESA)

Scientific classification
- Kingdom: Animalia
- Phylum: Arthropoda
- Clade: Pancrustacea
- Class: Insecta
- Order: Hymenoptera
- Family: Colletidae
- Genus: Hylaeus
- Species: H. facilis

Binomial name
- Hylaeus facilis (Smith, 1879)

Synonyms
- Prosopis facilis Smith, 1879

Species of bee

Hylaeus facilis is a species of bee, also known by the common name easy yellow-faced bee. It is endemic to Hawaii and known from only two populations. In September 2016, along with six other Hawaiian Hylaeus species, H. facilis was listed for protection under the United States Endangered Species Act. This marked a first listing for any bee species in the US.

== Description ==
Hylaeus facilis is of medium size with smoky wings. Males have a large lower facial oval yellow spot with a yellow stripe near the eyes whereas females are completely black.

== Distribution and habitat ==
Hylaeus facilis is now known only, in two populations of unknown size, from a coastal habitat on Molokai and a lowland wet forest on Oahu. Threats to the species include habitat degradation by nonnative animals and plants, predation by nonnative insects, fires and climate change.
