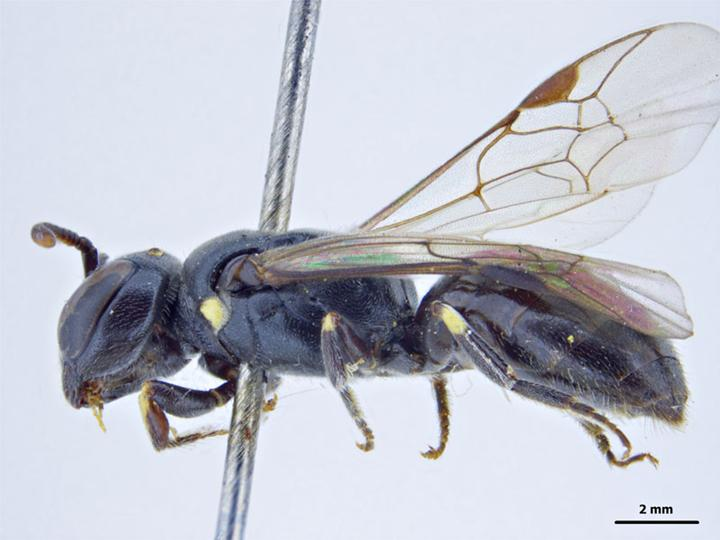
- Female

Scientific classification
- Kingdom: Animalia
- Phylum: Arthropoda
- Clade: Pancrustacea
- Class: Insecta
- Order: Hymenoptera
- Family: Colletidae
- Genus: Hylaeus
- Species: H. brevior

Binomial name
- Hylaeus brevior (Cockerell, 1918)

Synonyms
- Prosopis brevior Cockerell, 1918; Prosopis perhumilis Cockerell, 1916

= Hylaeus brevior =

Species of bee

Hylaeus brevior, or Hylaeus (Prosopisteron) brevior, is a species of bee in the family Colletidae and subfamily Hylaeinae. It is endemic to Australia. It was described by British-American entomologist Theodore Dru Alison Cockerell in 1918.

== Description ==
Integumental colouration is mainly black, with yellow markings.

== Distribution and habitat ==
The species occurs in eastern Australia. The type locality is Oxley, Brisbane, in south-eastern Queensland. It has also been recorded from Sydney.

== Behaviour ==
The adults are flying mellivores.

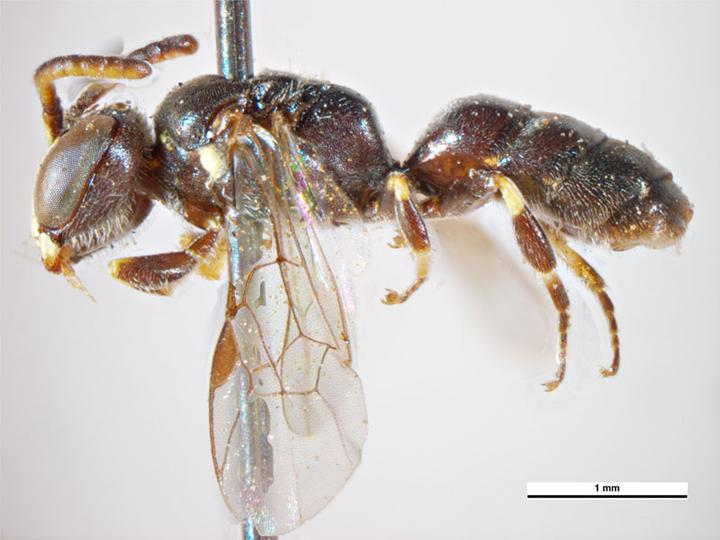
Male
