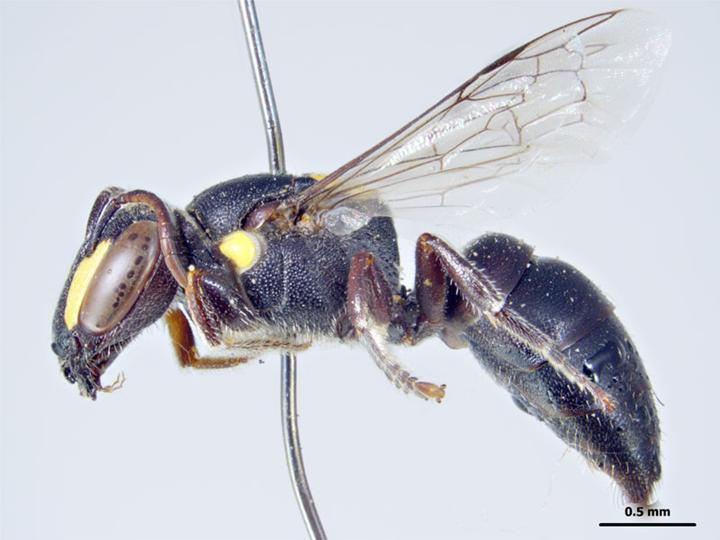
- Female

Scientific classification
- Kingdom: Animalia
- Phylum: Arthropoda
- Clade: Pancrustacea
- Class: Insecta
- Order: Hymenoptera
- Family: Colletidae
- Genus: Hylaeus
- Species: H. certus

Binomial name
- Hylaeus certus (Cockerell, 1921)

Synonyms
- Prosopis certa Cockerell, 1921

= Hylaeus certus =

Species of bee

Hylaeus certus, or Hylaeus (Euprosopellus) certus, is a species of bee in the family Colletidae and subfamily Hylaeinae. It is endemic to Australia. It was described by British-American entomologist Theodore Dru Alison Cockerell in 1921.

== Description ==
Body length of both males and females is about 8 mm. Integumental colouration is mainly black, with bright lemon-yellow markings.

== Distribution and habitat ==
The species occurs in south-eastern mainland Australia. The type locality is Brisbane.

== Behaviour ==
The adults are flying mellivores. Flowering plants visited by the bees include Eucalyptus and Leptospermum species.

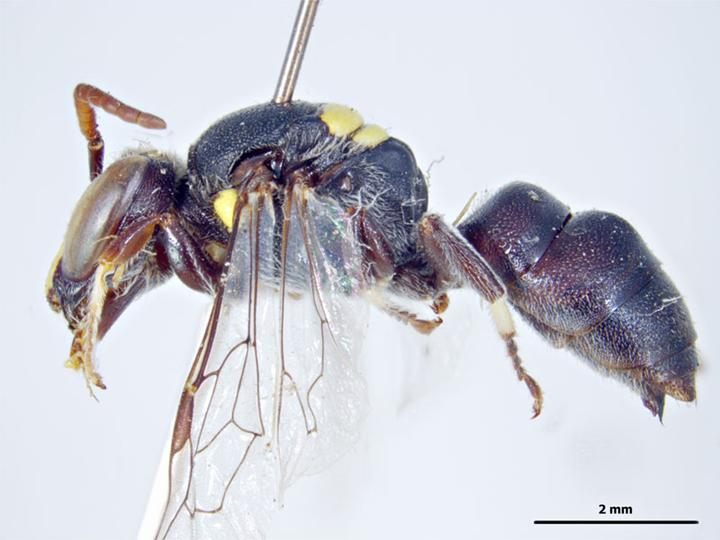
Male
