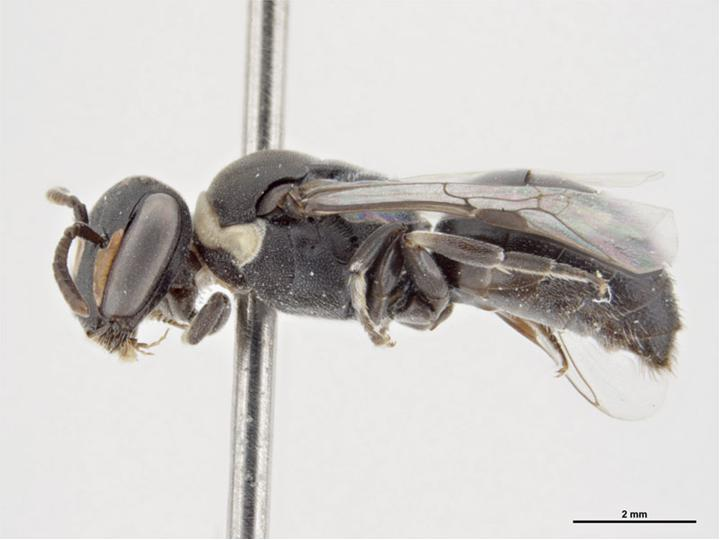
- Female

Scientific classification
- Kingdom: Animalia
- Phylum: Arthropoda
- Clade: Pancrustacea
- Class: Insecta
- Order: Hymenoptera
- Family: Colletidae
- Genus: Hylaeus
- Species: H. amiculinus

Binomial name
- Hylaeus amiculinus (Cockerell, 1922)

Synonyms
- Gnathoprosopis amiculina Cockerell, 1922

= Hylaeus amiculinus =

Species of bee

Hylaeus amiculinus, or Hylaeus (Gnathoprosopis) amiculinus, is a species of bee in the family Colletidae and subfamily Hylaeinae. It is endemic to Australia. It was described by British-American entomologist Theodore Dru Alison Cockerell in 1922.

== Description ==
Integumental colouration is mainly black, with cream markings.

== Distribution and habitat ==
The species occurs in south-eastern mainland Australia. The type locality is Brisbane.

== Behaviour ==
The adults are flying mellivores. Flowering plants visited by the bees include Eucalyptus and Leptospermum species.

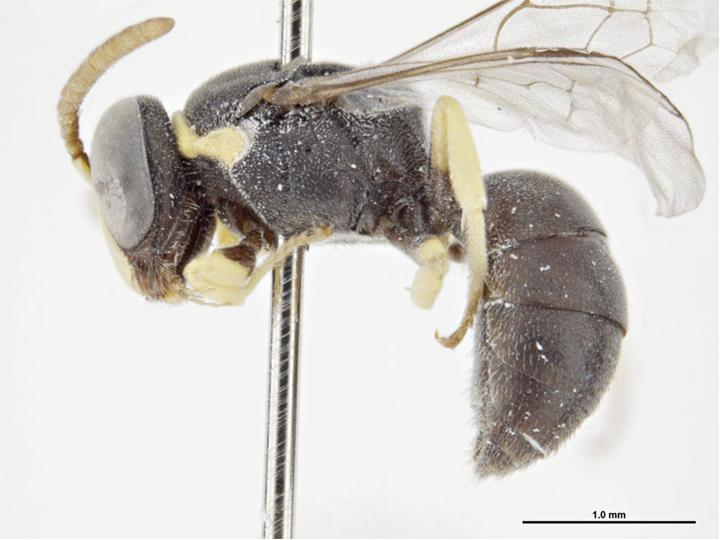
Male
