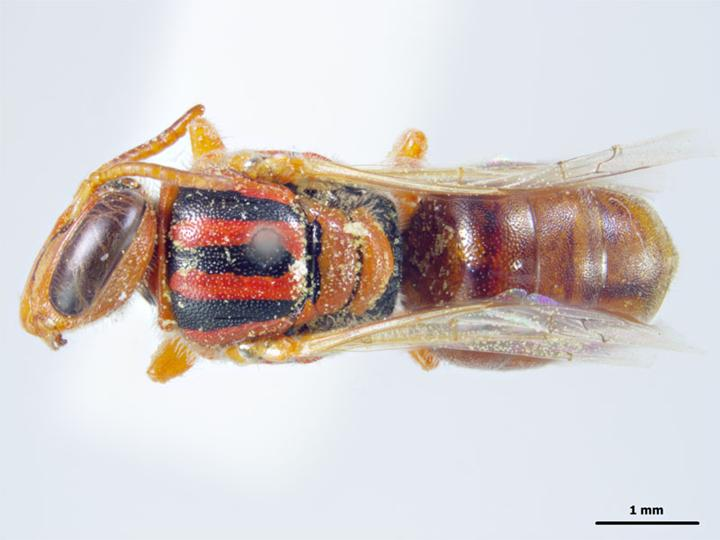
- Female

Scientific classification
- Kingdom: Animalia
- Phylum: Arthropoda
- Clade: Pancrustacea
- Class: Insecta
- Order: Hymenoptera
- Family: Colletidae
- Genus: Hylaeus
- Species: H. husela

Binomial name
- Hylaeus husela (Cockerell, 1910)

Synonyms
- Prosopis husela Cockerell, 1910

= Hylaeus husela =

Species of bee

Hylaeus husela, or Hylaeus (Euprosopis) husela, is a species of bee in the family Colletidae and subfamily Hylaeinae. It is endemic to Australia. It was described by British-American entomologist Theodore Dru Alison Cockerell in 1910.

== Etymology ==
The specific epithet husela (Malay: "eleven") alludes to the barring on the mesothorax.

== Description ==
Female body length is about 8 mm, male body length about 7 mm. Integumental colouration is black, with yellow markings and ferruginous abdomen.

== Distribution and habitat ==
The species occurs across northern Australia. The type locality is Townsville.

== Behaviour ==
The adults are flying mellivores.

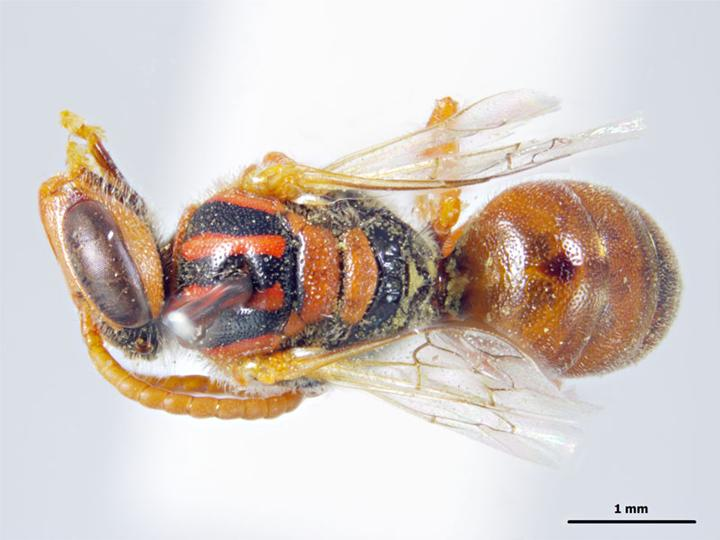
Male
