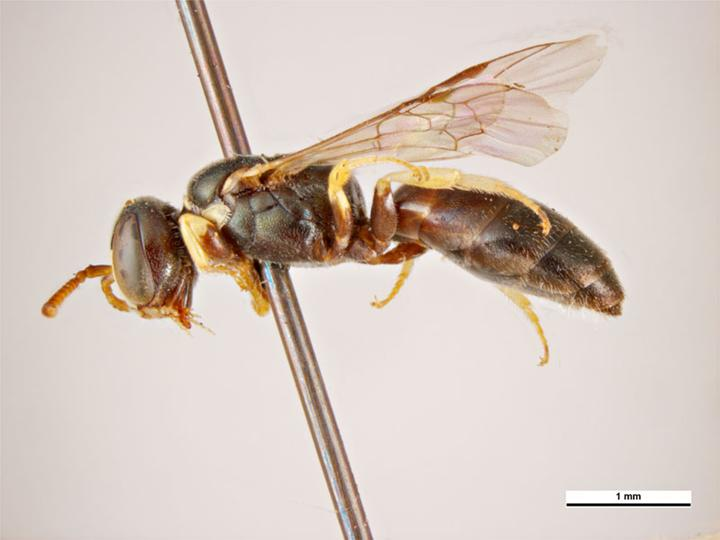
- Female

Scientific classification
- Kingdom: Animalia
- Phylum: Arthropoda
- Clade: Pancrustacea
- Class: Insecta
- Order: Hymenoptera
- Family: Colletidae
- Genus: Hylaeus
- Species: H. chlorosomus

Binomial name
- Hylaeus chlorosomus (Cockerell, 1913)

Synonyms
- Prosopis chlorosoma Cockerell, 1913

= Hylaeus chlorosomus =

Species of bee

Hylaeus chlorosomus, or Hylaeus (Prosopisteron) chlorosomus, also known as the yellow-bodied masked bee, is a species of bee in the family Colletidae and subfamily Hylaeinae. It is endemic to Australia. It was described by British-American entomologist Theodore Dru Alison Cockerell in 1913.

== Description ==
Female body length is about 4.5 mm. Integumental colouration is mainly dark green to black, with yellow markings.

== Distribution and habitat ==
The species occurs in both south-western and south-eastern Australia. The type locality is Croydon, Victoria.

== Behaviour ==
The adults are flying mellivores. Flowering plants visited by the bees include Calothamnus species.

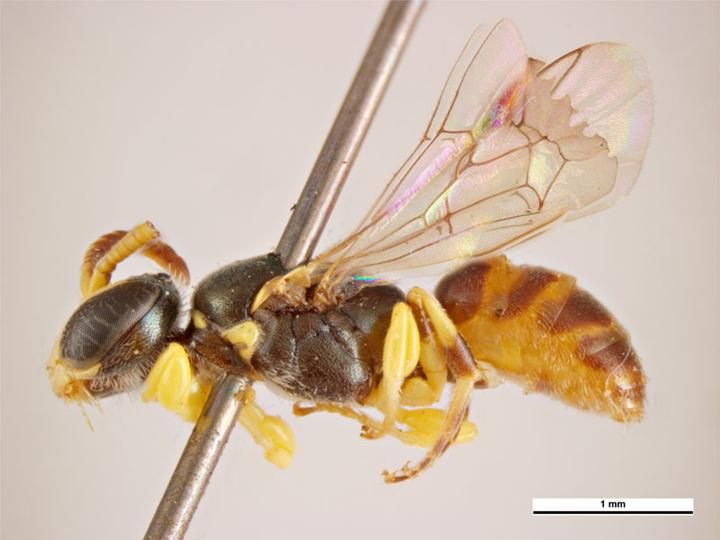
Male
