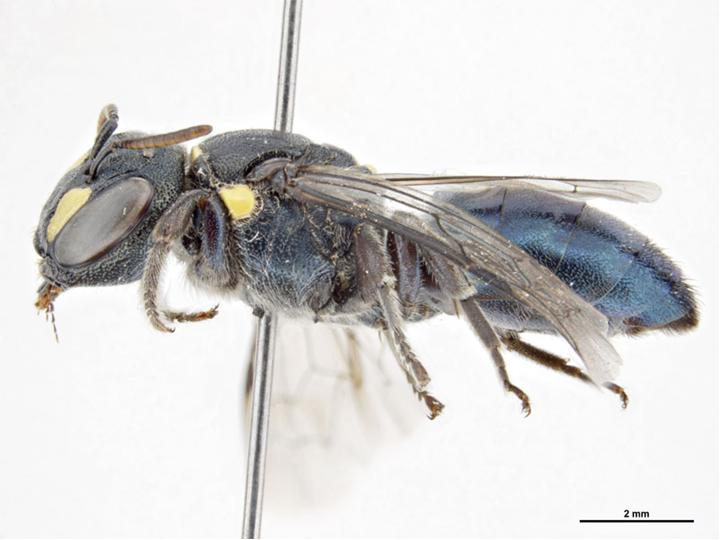
- Female

Scientific classification
- Kingdom: Animalia
- Phylum: Arthropoda
- Clade: Pancrustacea
- Class: Insecta
- Order: Hymenoptera
- Family: Colletidae
- Genus: Hylaeus
- Species: H. musgravei

Binomial name
- Hylaeus musgravei Cockerell, 1929

Synonyms
- Hylaeus musgravei Cockerell, 1929

= Hylaeus musgravei =

Species of bee

Hylaeus musgravei, or Hylaeus (Euprosopoides) musgravei, is a species of bee in the family Colletidae and subfamily Hylaeinae. It is endemic to Australia. It was described by British-American entomologist Theodore Dru Alison Cockerell in 1929.

== Etymology ==
The specific epithet musgravei honours Anthony Musgrave for his contributions to Australian entomology.

== Description ==
Male body length is about 10.5 mm. Integumental colouration is mainly black, with bright orange markings; the abdomen is a "deep rich purple shaded with green".

== Distribution and habitat ==
The species occurs in south-west Western Australia. The type locality is King George Sound.

== Behaviour ==
The adults are flying mellivores.

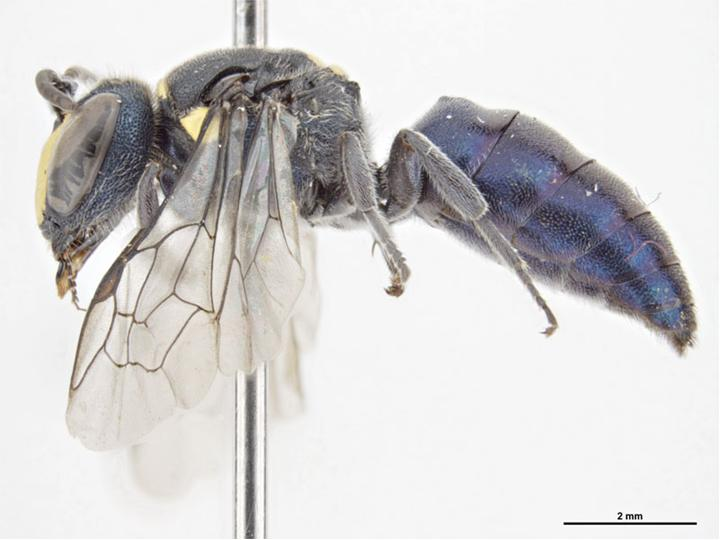
Male
