= Hylaeus assimulans =

Conservation status
- Endangered (ESA)

Scientific classification
- Kingdom: Animalia
- Phylum: Arthropoda
- Clade: Pancrustacea
- Class: Insecta
- Order: Hymenoptera
- Family: Colletidae
- Genus: Hylaeus
- Species: H. assimulans

Binomial name
- Hylaeus assimulans (Perkins, 1899)

Synonyms
- Nesoprosopis assimulans Perkins, 1899

Species of bee

Hylaeus assimulans is a species of bee, also known by the common name Assimulans yellow-faced bee. It is endemic to Hawaii and known from only five populations. In September 2016, along with six other Hawaiian Hylaeus species, H. assimulans was listed for protection under the United States Endangered Species Act. This marked a first listing for any bee species in the US.

== Description ==
Hylaeus assimulans is relatively large when compared with other coastal Hylaeus species. Its wings are smoky in appearance. Males are colored black with yellow facial marks whereas females are completely black.

== Distribution and habitat ==
Hylaeus assimulans is found in coastal and lowland dry forest. Populations are now known only from the islands of Kahoolawe, Lanai and Maui. Threats to the species include habitat degradation by nonnative animals and plants, predation by nonnative insects, fires and climate change.
