= Hylaeus infans =

Scientific classification
- Kingdom: Animalia
- Phylum: Arthropoda
- Clade: Pancrustacea
- Class: Insecta
- Order: Hymenoptera
- Family: Colletidae
- Genus: Hylaeus
- Species: H. infans

Binomial name
- Hylaeus infans (Cockerell, 1910)

Synonyms
- Prosopis infans Cockerell, 1910

Species of bee

Hylaeus infans, or Hylaeus (Prosopisteron) infans, is a species of bee in the family Colletidae and subfamily Hylaeinae. It is endemic to Australia. It was described by British-American entomologist Theodore Dru Alison Cockerell in 1910.

== Description ==
Male body length is about 4 mm. Integumental colouration is mainly black.

== Distribution and habitat ==
The species occurs in eastern Australia. The type locality is Mackay, Queensland.

== Behaviour ==
The adults are flying mellivores.
