= Hylaeus nigrescens =

Scientific classification
- Kingdom: Animalia
- Phylum: Arthropoda
- Clade: Pancrustacea
- Class: Insecta
- Order: Hymenoptera
- Family: Colletidae
- Genus: Hylaeus
- Species: H. nigrescens

Binomial name
- Hylaeus nigrescens (Cockerell, 1918)

Synonyms
- Prosopis cyaneomicans nigrescens Cockerell, 1918

Species of bee

Hylaeus nigrescens, or Hylaeus (Prosopisteron) nigrescens, is a species of bee in the family Colletidae and subfamily Hylaeinae. It is endemic to Australia. It was described by British-American entomologist Theodore Dru Alison Cockerell in 1918.

== Description ==
Integumental colouration is mainly black, with brown markings.

== Distribution and habitat ==
The species occurs in eastern Australia. The type locality is Bribie Island in south-eastern Queensland.

== Behaviour ==
The adults are flying mellivores.
