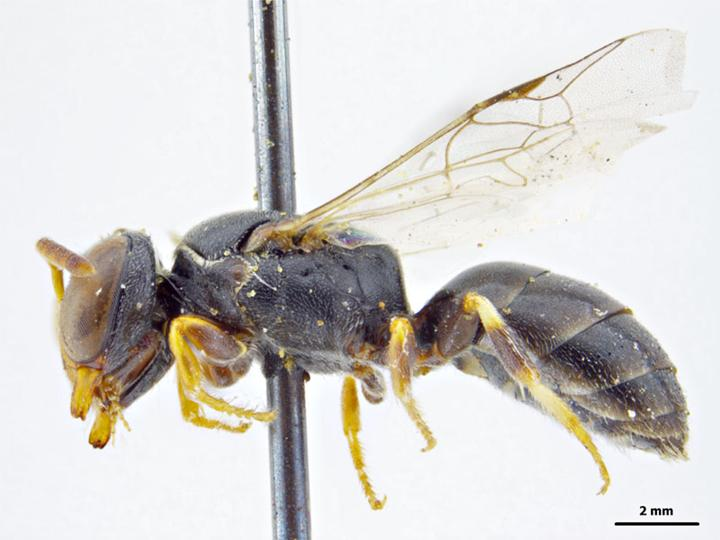
- Female

Scientific classification
- Kingdom: Animalia
- Phylum: Arthropoda
- Clade: Pancrustacea
- Class: Insecta
- Order: Hymenoptera
- Family: Colletidae
- Genus: Hylaeus
- Species: H. trimerops

Binomial name
- Hylaeus trimerops (Cockerell, 1916)

Synonyms
- Prosopis trimerops Cockerell, 1916

= Hylaeus trimerops =

Species of bee

Hylaeus trimerops, or Hylaeus (Prosopisteron) trimerops, is a species of bee in the family Colletidae and subfamily Hylaeinae. It is endemic to Australia. It was described by British-American entomologist Theodore Dru Alison Cockerell in 1916.

== Description ==
Female body length is about 4 mm. Integumental colouration is mainly black, with yellow to reddish markings.

== Distribution and habitat ==
The species occurs in south-west Western Australia. The type locality is Yallingup.

== Behaviour ==
The adults are flying mellivores.

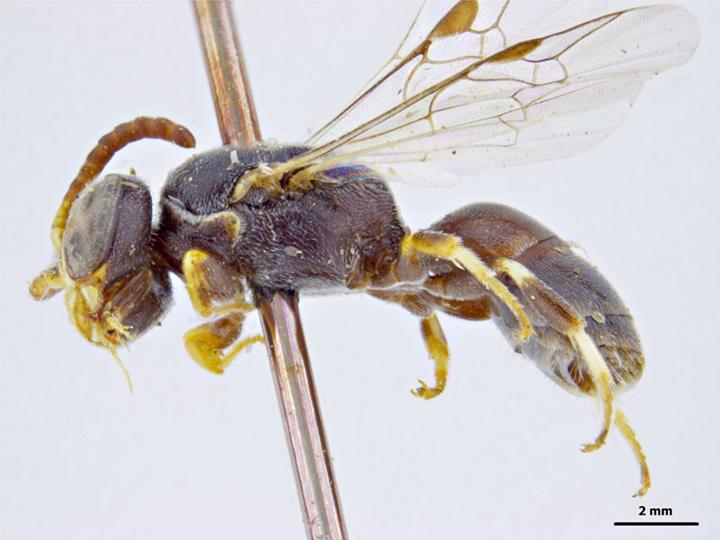
Male
