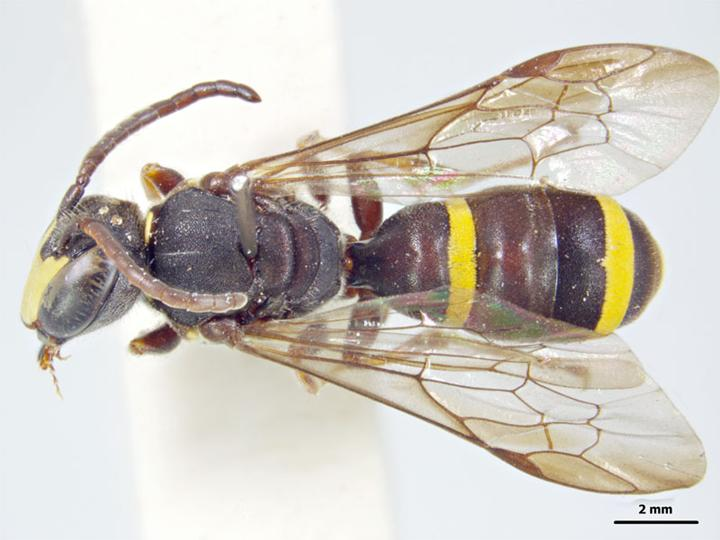

Scientific classification
- Kingdom: Animalia
- Phylum: Arthropoda
- Clade: Pancrustacea
- Class: Insecta
- Order: Hymenoptera
- Family: Colletidae
- Genus: Hylaeus
- Species: H. foveatus

Binomial name
- Hylaeus foveatus (Rayment, 1950)

Synonyms
- Analastoroides foveata

= Hylaeus foveatus =

Species of bee

Hylaeus foveatus, a wasp-like bee, is a species of hymenopteran in the family Colletidae and the subfamily Analastoroides. It is found in Victoria and New South Wales in Australia.

It was first described as Analastoroides foveata by Tarlton Rayment in 1950, from a female specimen collected at Jamberoo. Rayment described the females as "feverishly active on hot days". In 1981, T.F. Houston revised the generic status of Analastoroides, making it a subgenus of Hylaeus, and thus giving this species the name, Hylaeus foveatus.
