= Hylaeus amatus =

Scientific classification
- Kingdom: Animalia
- Phylum: Arthropoda
- Clade: Pancrustacea
- Class: Insecta
- Order: Hymenoptera
- Family: Colletidae
- Genus: Hylaeus
- Species: H. amatus

Binomial name
- Hylaeus amatus (Cockerell, 1909)

Synonyms
- Prosopis amata Cockerell, 1909; Prosopis cyaniventris Friese, 1924

Species of bee

Hylaeus amatus, or Hylaeus (Euprosopoides) amatus, is a species of bee in the family Colletidae and subfamily Hylaeinae. It is endemic to Australia. It was described by British-American entomologist Theodore Dru Alison Cockerell in 1909.

== Distribution and habitat ==
The species occurs in north-eastern Australia. Type localities include Mackay and Kuranda.

== Behaviour ==
The adults are flying mellivores. Flowering plants visited by the bees include Xanthorrhoea species.
