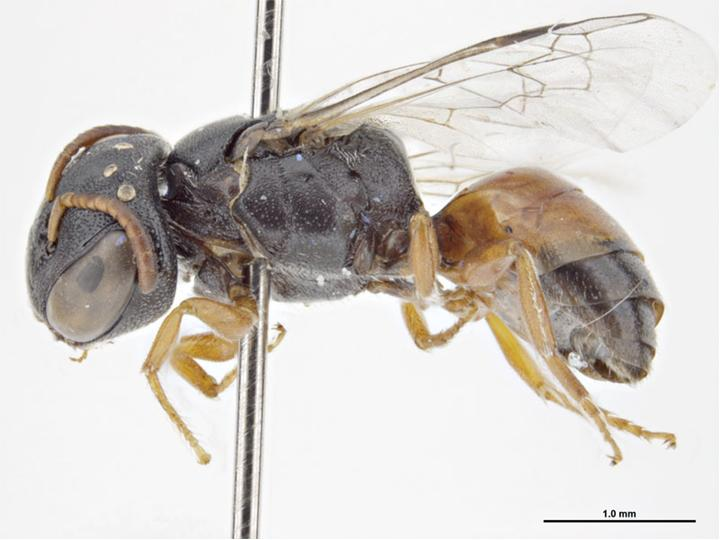
- Female

Scientific classification
- Kingdom: Animalia
- Phylum: Arthropoda
- Clade: Pancrustacea
- Class: Insecta
- Order: Hymenoptera
- Family: Colletidae
- Genus: Hylaeus
- Species: H. riekianus

Binomial name
- Hylaeus riekianus Houston, 1981

= Hylaeus riekianus =

Species of bee

Hylaeus riekianus, or Hylaeus (Hylaeteron) riekianus, is a species of bee in the family Colletidae and subfamily Hylaeinae. It is endemic to Australia. It was described by Australian entomologist Terry Houston in 1981.

== Distribution and habitat ==
The species occurs in the arid south of inland Western Australia. The type locality is 48 km west of Coolgardie.

== Behaviour ==
The adults are flying mellivores. Flowering plants visited by the bees include Grevillea species.

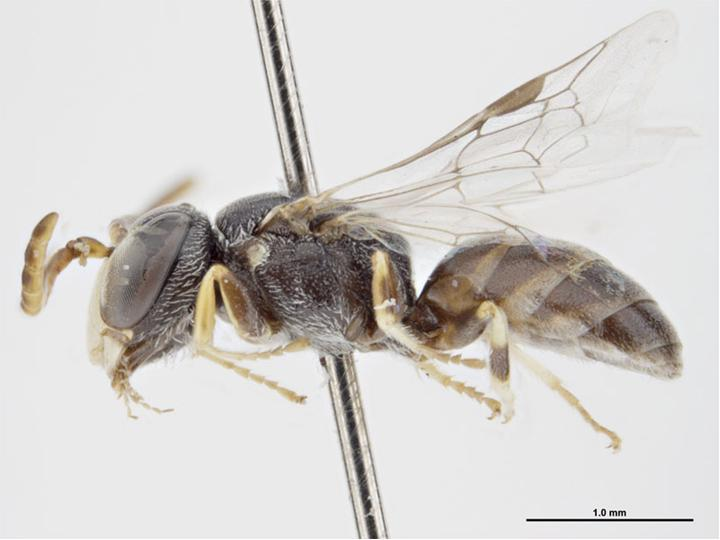
Male
