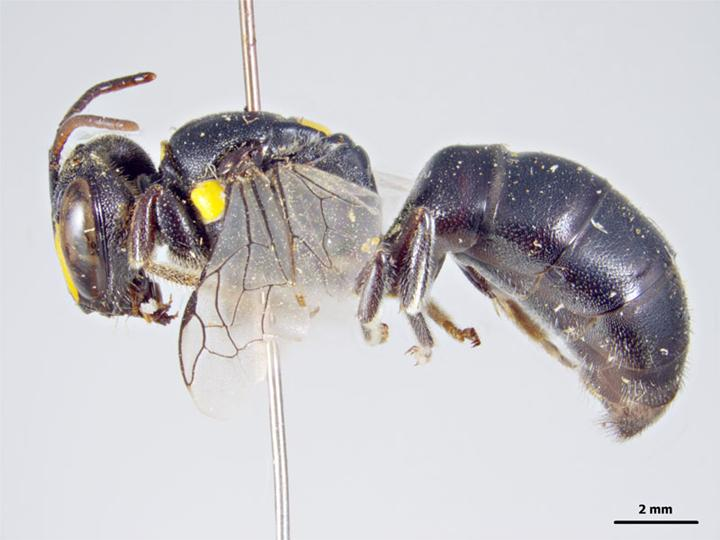
- Female

Scientific classification
- Kingdom: Animalia
- Phylum: Arthropoda
- Clade: Pancrustacea
- Class: Insecta
- Order: Hymenoptera
- Family: Colletidae
- Genus: Hylaeus
- Species: H. chrysaspis

Binomial name
- Hylaeus chrysaspis (Cockerell, 1910)

Synonyms
- Prosopis chrysaspis Cockerell, 1910; Hylaeus perconstrictus Cockerell, 1929; Hylaeus gracilicaudis Cockerell, 1929

= Hylaeus chrysaspis =

Species of bee

Hylaeus chrysaspis, or Hylaeus (Euprosopellus) chrysaspis, is a species of bee in the family Colletidae and subfamily Hylaeinae. It is endemic to Australia. It was described by British-American entomologist Theodore Dru Alison Cockerell in 1910.

== Description ==
Female body length is 10.5 mm. Integumental colouration is mainly black, with bright, chrome yellow markings.

== Distribution and habitat ==
The species occurs across southern mainland Australia. Type localities include Adelaide and King George Sound.

== Behaviour ==
The adults are flying mellivores. Flowering plants visited by the bees include Eucalyptus, Leptospermum and Melaleuca species.

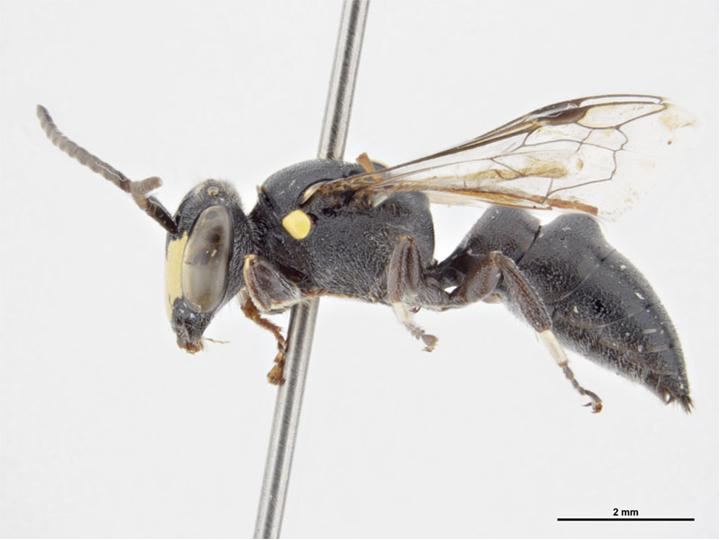
Male
