= Hylaeus mana =

Conservation status
- Endangered (ESA)

Scientific classification
- Kingdom: Animalia
- Phylum: Arthropoda
- Clade: Pancrustacea
- Class: Insecta
- Order: Hymenoptera
- Family: Colletidae
- Genus: Hylaeus
- Species: H. mana

Binomial name
- Hylaeus mana Magnacca & Daly, 2003

Species of bee

Hylaeus mana is a species of bee that is endemic to Hawaii and known from only four populations. In September 2016, along with six other Hawaiian yellow-faced bee species, H. mana was listed for protection under the United States Endangered Species Act. This marked a first listing for any bee species in the US.

== Description ==
Hylaeus mana is the smallest of Hawaiian Hylaeus species. It is colored black with yellow facial markings. While the male's face is largely yellow, the female's face is characterized by three yellow lines.

== Distribution and habitat ==
Hylaeus mana is currently known only from four sites of lowland forest in the Koʻolau Range on Oahu, at elevations of around 1,400 feet (430 m). Threats to the species include habitat degradation by non-native animals and plants, predation by non-native insects, fires and climate change.
