= Hylaeus kuakea =

Conservation status
- Endangered (ESA)

Scientific classification
- Kingdom: Animalia
- Phylum: Arthropoda
- Clade: Pancrustacea
- Class: Insecta
- Order: Hymenoptera
- Family: Colletidae
- Genus: Hylaeus
- Species: H. kuakea

Binomial name
- Hylaeus kuakea Magnacca & Daly, 2003

Species of bee

Hylaeus kuakea is a species of bee that is endemic to Hawaii and known from only two populations. In September 2016, H. kuakea and six other Hawaiian yellow-faced bee species were listed for protection under the United States Endangered Species Act. This marked a first listing for any bee species in the US.

== Description ==
Hylaeus kuakea is small and colored black. Its wings have a somewhat smoky color. While it has some facial markings similar to some other Hylaeus species, H. kuakea is distinguished by an ivory-colored marking covering its lower face. These characteristics have been observed in male specimens, females have not yet been collected or observed.

== Distribution and habitat ==
Hylaeus kuakea is currently known only from two patches of lowland forest in the Waiʻanae Range on Oahu. Threats to the species include habitat degradation by nonnative animals and plants, predation by nonnative insects, fires and climate change.
