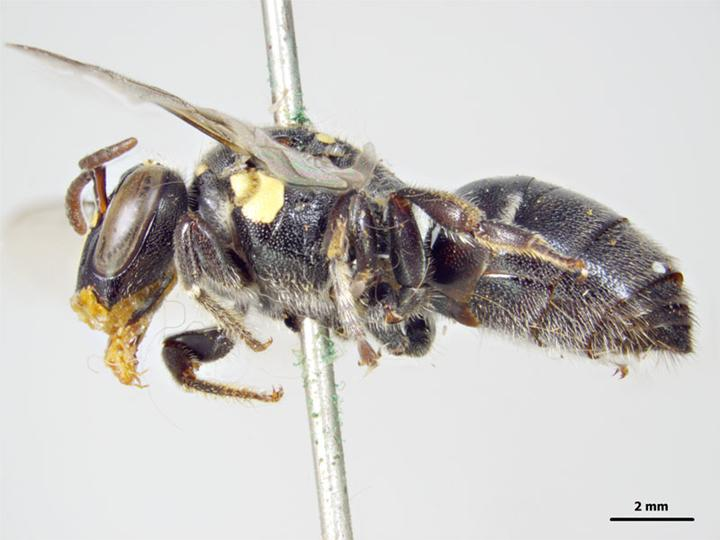
- Female

Scientific classification
- Kingdom: Animalia
- Phylum: Arthropoda
- Clade: Pancrustacea
- Class: Insecta
- Order: Hymenoptera
- Family: Colletidae
- Genus: Meroglossa
- Species: M. impressifrons

Binomial name
- Meroglossa impressifrons (Smith, 1853)

Synonyms
- Prosopis impressifrons Smith, 1853

= Meroglossa impressifrons =

Species of bee

Meroglossa impressifrons is a species of bee in the family Colletidae and the subfamily Hylaeinae. It is endemic to Australia. It was described in 1853 by English entomologist Frederick Smith.

== Distribution and habitat ==
The species occurs in eastern Australia.

== Behaviour ==
The adults are flying mellivores.

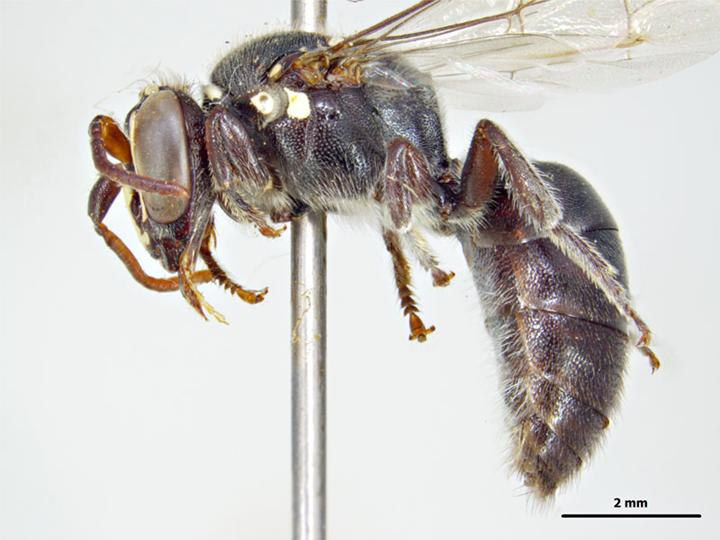
Male
