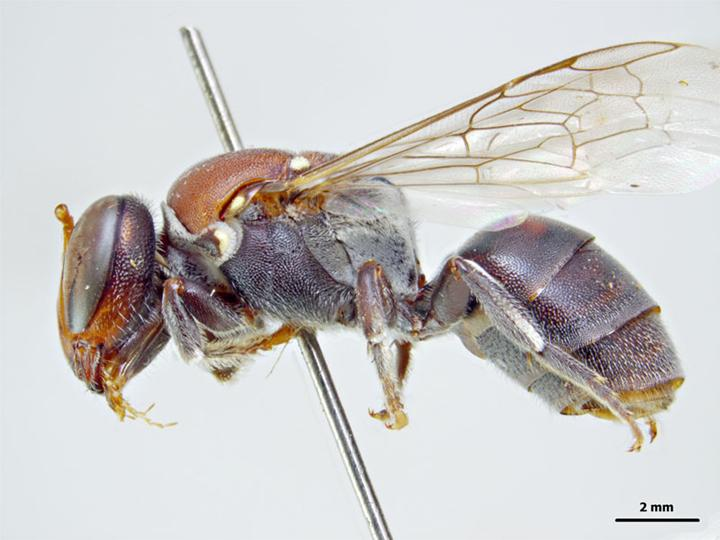
- Female

Scientific classification
- Kingdom: Animalia
- Phylum: Arthropoda
- Clade: Pancrustacea
- Class: Insecta
- Order: Hymenoptera
- Family: Colletidae
- Genus: Meroglossa
- Species: M. eucalypti

Binomial name
- Meroglossa eucalypti Cockerell, 1910

Synonyms
- Meroglossa deceptor Perkins, 1912; Prosopis disjuncta Friese, 1924

= Meroglossa eucalypti =

Species of bee

Meroglossa eucalypti is a species of bee in the family Colletidae and the subfamily Hylaeinae. It is endemic to Australia. It was described in 1910 by British-American entomologist Theodore Dru Alison Cockerell.

== Description ==
Male body length is about 9 mm. Colouration is mainly black and red with pale yellow or cream markings.

== Distribution and habitat ==
The species occurs in the Northern Territory and north-eastern Queensland. Type localities include Mackay and Cairns.

== Behaviour ==
The adults are flying mellivores. Flowering plants visited by the bees include Barringtonia, Borreria, Cassia, Eucalyptus, Rosa and Tristania species.

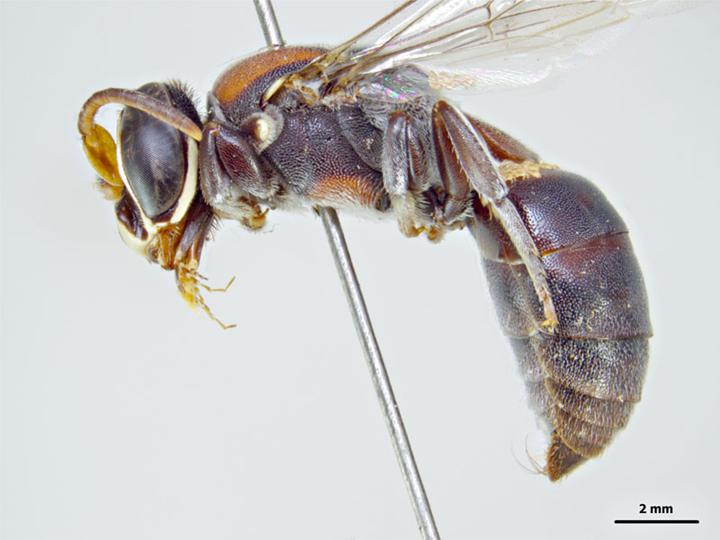
Male
