= Palaeorhiza caerulescens =

Scientific classification
- Kingdom: Animalia
- Phylum: Arthropoda
- Clade: Pancrustacea
- Class: Insecta
- Order: Hymenoptera
- Family: Colletidae
- Genus: Palaeorhiza
- Species: P. caerulescens

Binomial name
- Palaeorhiza caerulescens (Friese, 1924)

Synonyms
- Prosopis caerulescens Friese, 1924

Species of bee

Palaeorhiza caerulescens, or Palaeorhiza (Palaeorhiza) caerulescens, is a species of bee in the family Colletidae and subfamily Hylaeinae. It is endemic to Australia. It was described by German entomologist Heinrich Friese in 1924.

== Distribution and habitat ==
The species occurs in coastal eastern Australia. The type locality is Mackay, Queensland.

== Behaviour ==
The adults are flying mellivores. Flowering plants visited by the bees include Cassia species.
