= Meroglossa soror =

Scientific classification
- Kingdom: Animalia
- Phylum: Arthropoda
- Clade: Pancrustacea
- Class: Insecta
- Order: Hymenoptera
- Family: Colletidae
- Genus: Meroglossa
- Species: M. soror

Binomial name
- Meroglossa soror Perkins, 1912

Species of bee

Meroglossa soror is a species of bee in the family Colletidae and the subfamily Hylaeinae. It is endemic to Australia. It was described in 1912 by English entomologist Robert Cyril Layton Perkins.

== Distribution and habitat ==
The species occurs in northern Australia. The type locality is the Herberton district of Far North Queensland. It has also been recorded from Darwin and Bathurst Island in the Northern Territory.

== Behaviour ==
The adults are flying mellivores.
