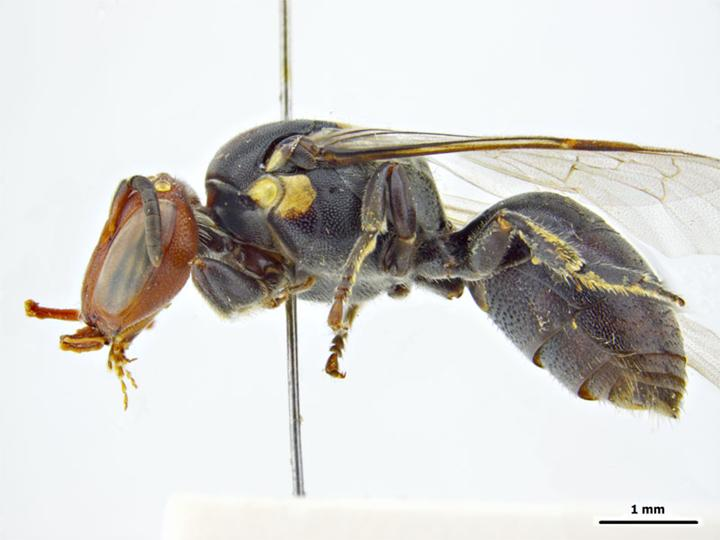
- Female

Scientific classification
- Kingdom: Animalia
- Phylum: Arthropoda
- Clade: Pancrustacea
- Class: Insecta
- Order: Hymenoptera
- Family: Colletidae
- Genus: Meroglossa
- Species: M. torrida

Binomial name
- Meroglossa torrida (Smith, 1879)

Synonyms
- Prosopis torrida Smith, 1879

= Meroglossa torrida =

Species of bee

Meroglossa torrida is a species of bee in the family Colletidae and the subfamily Hylaeinae. It is endemic to Australia. It was described in 1879 by English entomologist Frederick Smith.

== Distribution and habitat ==
The species occurs across northern Australia. The type locality is noted simply as "Queensland".

== Behaviour ==
The adults are solitary flying mellivores. They may nest in Cassia twigs; pre-reproductive adults of both sexes may be found in a nest. Flowering plants visited by the bees include Acacia, Angophora, Callistemon, Calytrix and Melaleuca species.

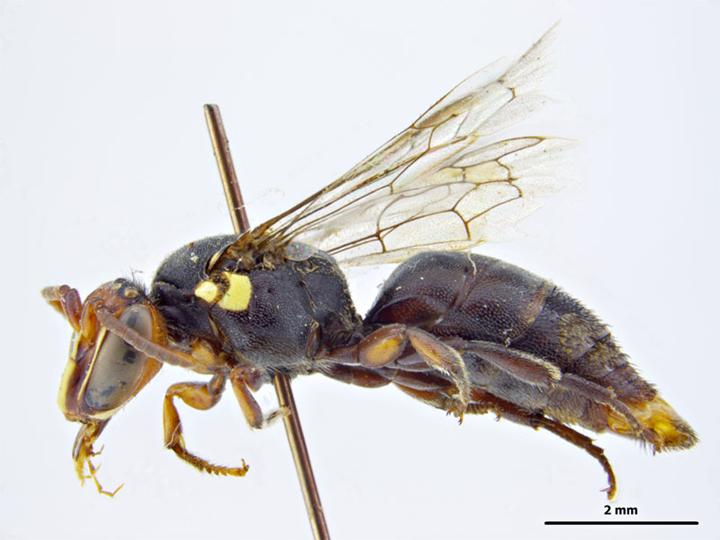
Male
