= Palaeorhiza luxuriosa =

Scientific classification
- Kingdom: Animalia
- Phylum: Arthropoda
- Clade: Pancrustacea
- Class: Insecta
- Order: Hymenoptera
- Family: Colletidae
- Genus: Palaeorhiza
- Species: P. luxuriosa

Binomial name
- Palaeorhiza luxuriosa (Cockerell, 1910)

Synonyms
- Meroglossa luxuriosa Cockerell, 1910

Species of bee

Palaeorhiza luxuriosa, or Palaeorhiza (Palaeorhiza) luxuriosa, is a species of bee in the family Colletidae and subfamily Hylaeinae. It is endemic to Australia. It was described by British entomologist Theodore Dru Alison Cockerell in 1910.

== Distribution and habitat ==
The species occurs in tropical coastal Queensland. The type locality is Kuranda.

== Behaviour ==
The adults are flying mellivores.
