= Hyleoides planifrons =

Scientific classification
- Kingdom: Animalia
- Phylum: Arthropoda
- Clade: Pancrustacea
- Class: Insecta
- Order: Hymenoptera
- Family: Colletidae
- Genus: Hyleoides
- Species: H. planifrons

Binomial name
- Hyleoides planifrons Houston, 1975

Species of bee

Hyleoides planifrons is a species of bee in the family Colletidae and the subfamily Hylaeinae. It is endemic to Australia. It was described in 1975 by Australian entomologist Terry Houston.

== Distribution and habitat ==
The species occurs in inland eastern Australia. The type locality is Blackall, Queensland.

== Behaviour ==
The adults are flying mellivores. Flowering plants visited by the bees include Atalaya species.
