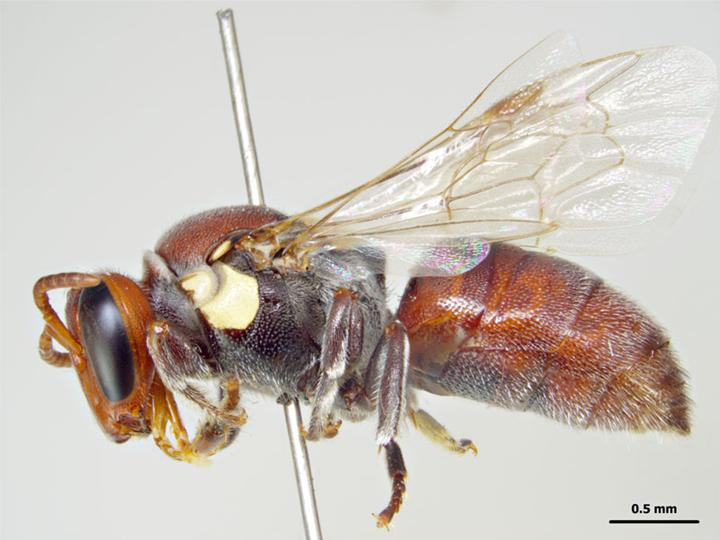
- Female

Scientific classification
- Kingdom: Animalia
- Phylum: Arthropoda
- Clade: Pancrustacea
- Class: Insecta
- Order: Hymenoptera
- Family: Colletidae
- Genus: Meroglossa
- Species: M. rubricata

Binomial name
- Meroglossa rubricata (Smith, 1879)

Synonyms
- Prosopis rubricata Smith, 1879

= Meroglossa rubricata =

Species of bee

Meroglossa rubricata is a species of bee in the family Colletidae and the subfamily Hylaeinae. It is endemic to Australia. It was described in 1879 by English entomologist Frederick Smith.

== Distribution and habitat ==
The species occurs in central and western Australia. The type locality is Swan River, Western Australia.

== Behaviour ==
The adults are flying mellivores. Flowering plants visited by the bees include Capparis and Hibbertia species.

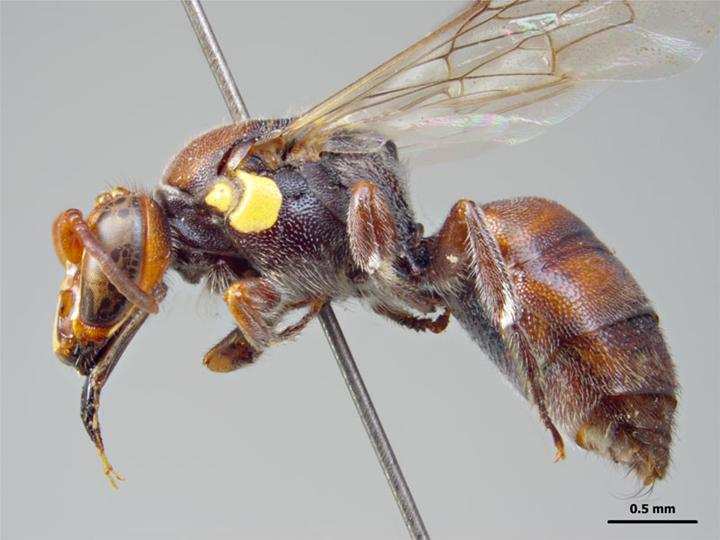
Male
