= Palaeorhiza viridifrons =

Scientific classification
- Kingdom: Animalia
- Phylum: Arthropoda
- Clade: Pancrustacea
- Class: Insecta
- Order: Hymenoptera
- Family: Colletidae
- Genus: Palaeorhiza
- Species: P. viridifrons

Binomial name
- Palaeorhiza viridifrons Cockerell, 1921

Species of bee

Palaeorhiza viridifrons, or Palaeorhiza (Cnemidorhiza) viridifrons, is a species of bee in the family Colletidae and subfamily Hylaeinae. It is endemic to Australia. It was described by British entomologist Theodore Dru Alison Cockerell in 1921.

== Description ==
The female holotype has a body length of 9 mm. Integumental colouration is mainly black with a bluish, green and purple metallic sheen, and with bright orange markings.

== Distribution and habitat ==
The species occurs in eastern Australia. The type locality is Brisbane. It has also been recorded from Dayboro, Queensland.

== Behaviour ==
The adults are flying mellivores.
