= Palaeorhiza kurandensis =

Scientific classification
- Kingdom: Animalia
- Phylum: Arthropoda
- Clade: Pancrustacea
- Class: Insecta
- Order: Hymenoptera
- Family: Colletidae
- Genus: Palaeorhiza
- Species: P. kurandensis

Binomial name
- Palaeorhiza kurandensis (Cockerell, 1909)

Synonyms
- Prosopis turneriana kurandensis Cockerell, 1909; Prosopis purpurascens Friese, 1924

Species of bee

Palaeorhiza kurandensis, or Palaeorhiza (Palaeorhiza) kurandensis, is a species of bee in the family Colletidae and subfamily Hylaeinae. It is endemic to Australia. It was described by British entomologist Theodore Dru Alison Cockerell in 1909.

== Distribution and habitat ==
The species occurs in tropical north-eastern Australia. The type locality is Kuranda, Queensland. It has also been recorded from Cooktown and Mackay.

== Behaviour ==
The adults are flying mellivores. Flowering plants visited by the bees include Eucalyptus and Hibiscus species.
