= Meroglossa ocellata =

Scientific classification
- Kingdom: Animalia
- Phylum: Arthropoda
- Clade: Pancrustacea
- Class: Insecta
- Order: Hymenoptera
- Family: Colletidae
- Genus: Meroglossa
- Species: M. ocellata

Binomial name
- Meroglossa ocellata Michener, 1965

Species of bee

Meroglossa ocellata is a species of bee in the family Colletidae and the subfamily Hylaeinae. It is endemic to Australia. It was described in 1965 by American entomologist Charles Duncan Michener.

== Distribution and habitat ==
The species occurs in the Top End of the Northern Territory. The type locality is Kings River.

== Behaviour ==
The adults are flying mellivores.
