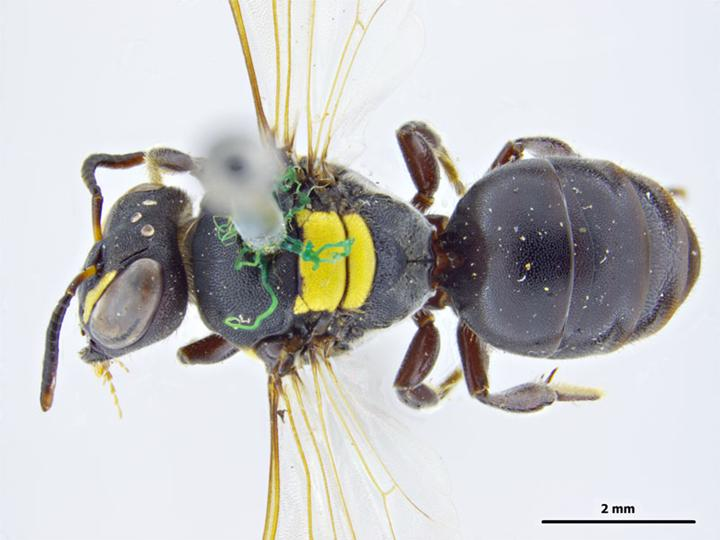
- Female

Scientific classification
- Kingdom: Animalia
- Phylum: Arthropoda
- Clade: Pancrustacea
- Class: Insecta
- Order: Hymenoptera
- Family: Colletidae
- Genus: Meroglossa
- Species: M. striaticeps

Binomial name
- Meroglossa striaticeps (Friese, 1924)

Synonyms
- Prosopis striaticeps Friese, 1924; Meroglossa chiropterina Cockerell, 1930

= Meroglossa striaticeps =

Species of bee

Meroglossa striaticeps is a species of bee in the family Colletidae and the subfamily Hylaeinae. It is endemic to Australia. It was described in 1924 by German entomologist Heinrich Friese.

== Distribution and habitat ==
The species occurs in northern Australia. Type localities include Mackay and Halifax, Queensland. It has also been recorded from the Northern Territory.

== Behaviour ==
The adults are flying mellivores. Flowering plants visited by the bees include Barringtonia, Cassia, Melaleuca, Rosa and Xanthorrhoea species.
