= Palaeorhiza recessiva =

Scientific classification
- Kingdom: Animalia
- Phylum: Arthropoda
- Clade: Pancrustacea
- Class: Insecta
- Order: Hymenoptera
- Family: Colletidae
- Genus: Palaeorhiza
- Species: P. recessiva

Binomial name
- Palaeorhiza recessiva (Cockerell, 1912)

Synonyms
- Meroglossa parallela recessiva Cockerell, 1912

Species of bee

Palaeorhiza recessiva, or Palaeorhiza (Cnemidorhiza) recessiva, is a species of bee in the family Colletidae and subfamily Hylaeinae. It is endemic to Australia. It was described by British entomologist Theodore Dru Alison Cockerell in 1912.

== Distribution and habitat ==
The species occurs in coastal northern Queensland. The type locality is Mackay. It has also been recorded from Palm Island.

== Behaviour ==
The adults are flying mellivores.
