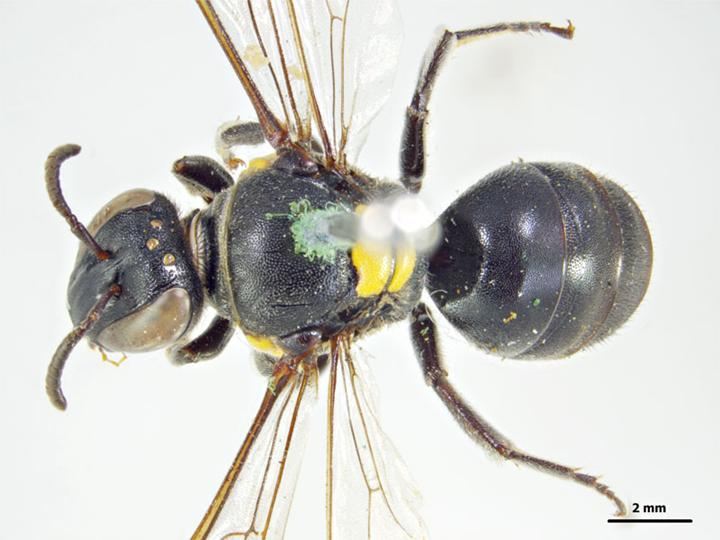
- Female

Scientific classification
- Kingdom: Animalia
- Phylum: Arthropoda
- Clade: Pancrustacea
- Class: Insecta
- Order: Hymenoptera
- Family: Colletidae
- Genus: Meroglossa
- Species: M. itamuca

Binomial name
- Meroglossa itamuca (Cockerell, 1910)

Synonyms
- Prosopis itamuca Cockerell, 1910; Meroglossa sulcifrons persulcata Cockerell, 1912; Meroglossa (Meroglossula) trigonoides Rayment, 1935

= Meroglossa itamuca =

Species of bee

Meroglossa itamuca is a species of bee in the family Colletidae and the subfamily Hylaeinae. It is endemic to Australia. It was described in 1910 by British-American entomologist Theodore Dru Alison Cockerell.

== Description ==
Female body length is about 10 mm. Colouration is mainly black, patched yellow.

== Distribution and habitat ==
The species occurs in eastern Australia. Type localities include Cairns.

== Behaviour ==
The adults are flying mellivores. Flowering plants visited by the bees include Hibbertia, Loranthus and Solanum species.

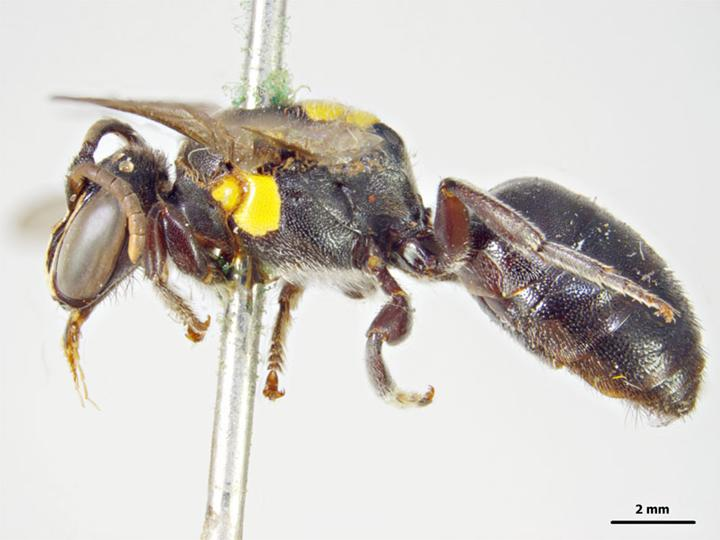
Male
