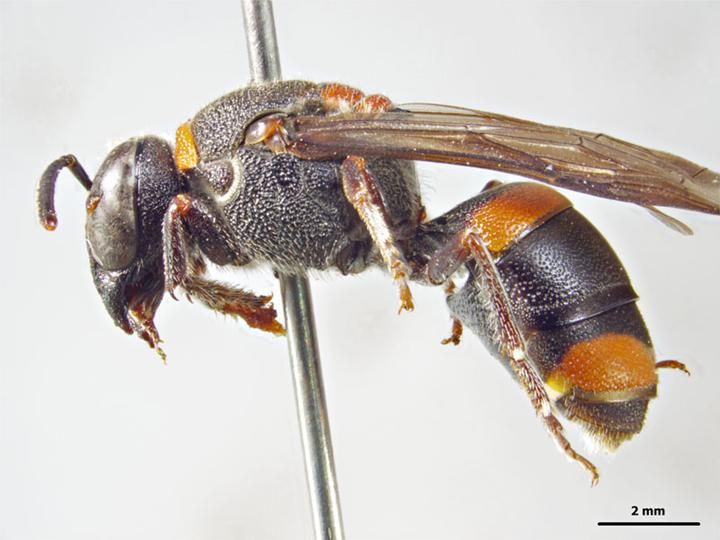
- Female

Scientific classification
- Kingdom: Animalia
- Phylum: Arthropoda
- Clade: Pancrustacea
- Class: Insecta
- Order: Hymenoptera
- Family: Colletidae
- Genus: Hyleoides
- Species: H. waterhousei

Binomial name
- Hyleoides waterhousei Cockerell, 1913

= Hyleoides waterhousei =

Species of bee

Hyleoides waterhousei is a species of bee in the family Colletidae and the subfamily Hylaeinae. It is endemic to Australia. It was described in 1913 by British-American entomologist Theodore Dru Alison Cockerell.

== Distribution and habitat ==
The species occurs across southern mainland Australia.

== Behaviour ==
The adults are flying mellivores.
