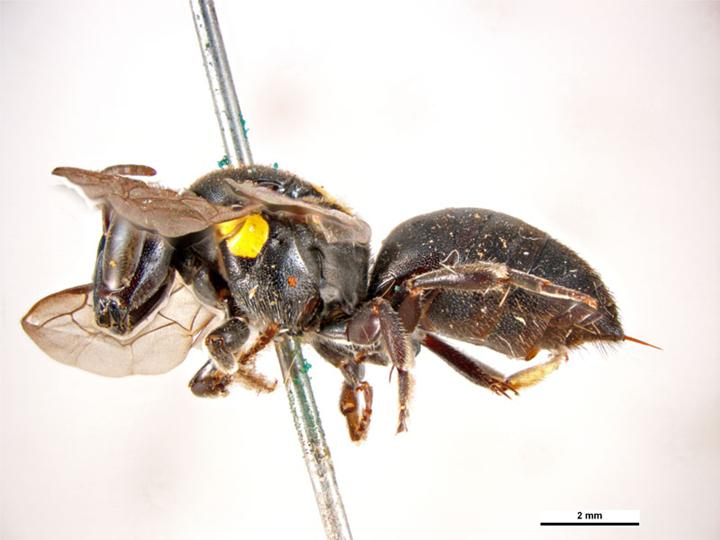
- Female

Scientific classification
- Kingdom: Animalia
- Phylum: Arthropoda
- Clade: Pancrustacea
- Class: Insecta
- Order: Hymenoptera
- Family: Colletidae
- Genus: Meroglossa
- Species: M. sulcifrons

Binomial name
- Meroglossa sulcifrons (Smith, 1853)

Synonyms
- Prosopis sulcifrons Smith, 1853; Prosopis nigrifrons Smith, 1853; Prosopis grandis Friese, 1924

= Meroglossa sulcifrons =

Species of bee

Meroglossa sulcifrons is a species of bee in the family Colletidae and the subfamily Hylaeinae. It is endemic to Australia. It was described in 1853 by English entomologist Frederick Smith.

== Distribution and habitat ==
The species occurs in eastern Australia. Type localities include Mackay, Queensland.

== Behaviour ==
The adults are flying mellivores. Flowering plants visited by the bees include Boronia, Daviesia, Eucalyptus, Leptospermum and Xanthorrhoea species.

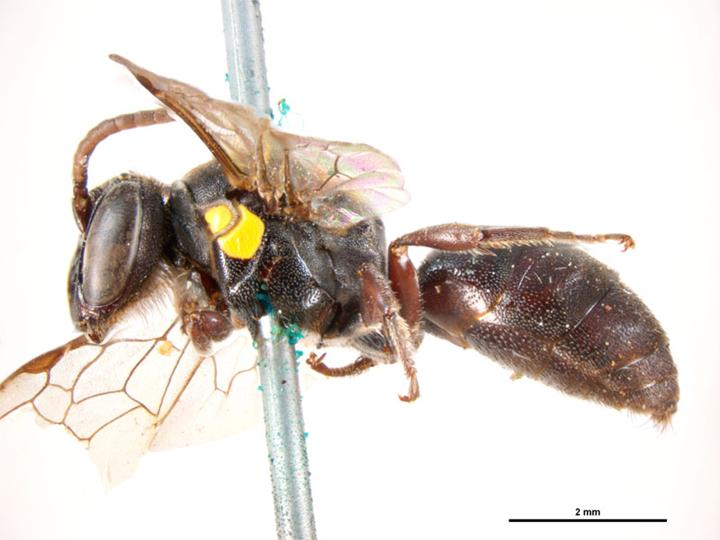
Male
