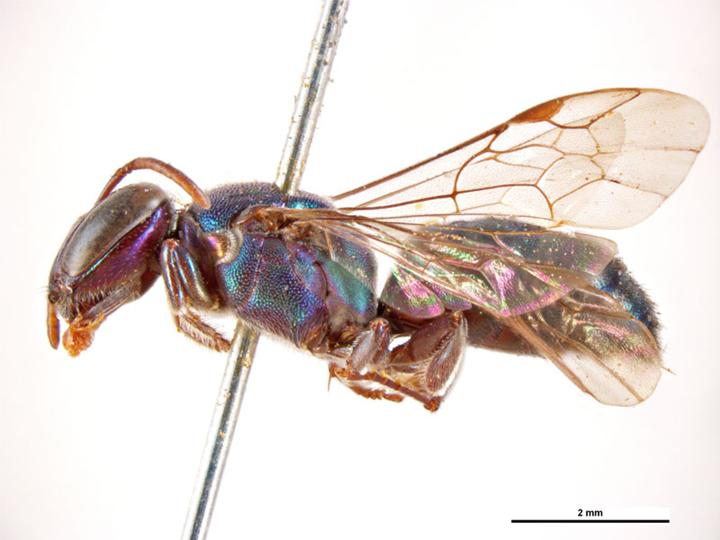
- Female

Scientific classification
- Kingdom: Animalia
- Phylum: Arthropoda
- Clade: Pancrustacea
- Class: Insecta
- Order: Hymenoptera
- Family: Colletidae
- Genus: Palaeorhiza
- Species: P. turneriana

Binomial name
- Palaeorhiza turneriana (Cockerell, 1905)

Synonyms
- Prosopis turneriana Cockerell, 1905

= Palaeorhiza turneriana =

Species of bee

Palaeorhiza turneriana, or Palaeorhiza (Callorhiza) turneriana, is a species of bee in the family Colletidae and subfamily Hylaeinae. It is endemic to Australia. It was described by British entomologist Theodore Dru Alison Cockerell in 1905.

== Distribution and habitat ==
The species occurs in coastal tropical Queensland. The type locality is Mackay. It has also been recorded from Kuranda and Cairns.

== Behaviour ==
The adults are flying mellivores.
