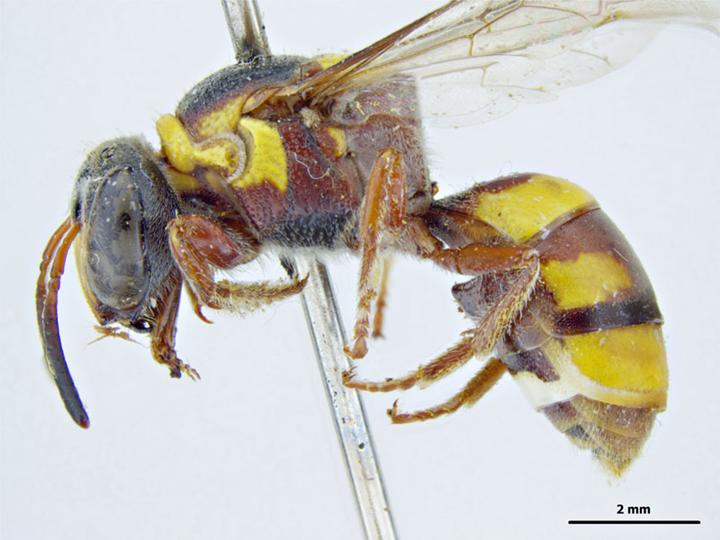
- Female

Scientific classification
- Kingdom: Animalia
- Phylum: Arthropoda
- Clade: Pancrustacea
- Class: Insecta
- Order: Hymenoptera
- Family: Colletidae
- Genus: Hyleoides
- Species: H. concinnula

Binomial name
- Hyleoides concinnula Cockerell, 1909

= Hyleoides concinnula =

Species of bee

Hyleoides concinnula is a species of bee in the family Colletidae and the subfamily Hylaeinae. It is endemic to Australia. It was described in 1909 by British-American entomologist Theodore Dru Alison Cockerell.

== Distribution and habitat ==
The species occurs in Western Australia. Published localities include Swan River and "north of Carnarvon".

== Behaviour ==
The adults are flying mellivores.

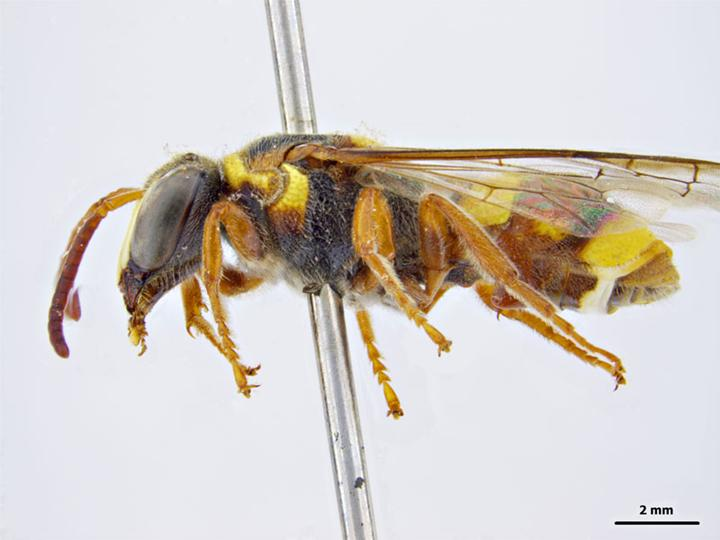
Male
