= Meroglossa canaliculata =

Scientific classification
- Kingdom: Animalia
- Phylum: Arthropoda
- Clade: Pancrustacea
- Class: Insecta
- Order: Hymenoptera
- Family: Colletidae
- Genus: Meroglossa
- Species: M. canaliculata

Binomial name
- Meroglossa canaliculata Smith, 1853

Species of bee

Meroglossa canaliculata is a species of bee in the family Colletidae and the subfamily Hylaeinae. It is endemic to Australia. It was described in 1853 by English entomologist Frederick Smith.

== Distribution and habitat ==
The species occurs in northern Australia. The type locality is Port Essington. Other published localities include Darwin and the East Alligator River in the Top End, as well as the Cairns district of Far North Queensland.

== Behaviour ==
The adults are flying mellivores.
