= Palaeorhiza mandibularis =

Scientific classification
- Kingdom: Animalia
- Phylum: Arthropoda
- Clade: Pancrustacea
- Class: Insecta
- Order: Hymenoptera
- Family: Colletidae
- Genus: Palaeorhiza
- Species: P. mandibularis

Binomial name
- Palaeorhiza mandibularis Michener, 1965

Species of bee

Palaeorhiza mandibularis, or Palaeorhiza (Anchirhiza) mandibularis, is a species of bee in the family Colletidae and subfamily Hylaeinae. It is native to Meganesia. It was described by American entomologist Charles Duncan Michener in 1965.

== Distribution and habitat ==
The species occurs in New Guinea and eastern Australia. The type locality is Beaudesert, Queensland. It has also been recorded from Mount Kaindi near Wau, Papua New Guinea.

== Behaviour ==
The adults are flying mellivores. Flowering plants visited by the bees include Euodia species.
