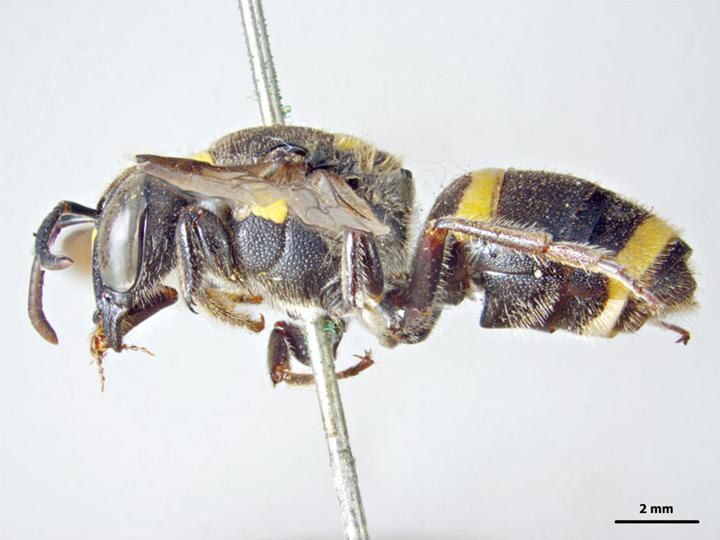
- Female

Scientific classification
- Kingdom: Animalia
- Phylum: Arthropoda
- Clade: Pancrustacea
- Class: Insecta
- Order: Hymenoptera
- Family: Colletidae
- Genus: Hyleoides
- Species: H. zonalis

Binomial name
- Hyleoides zonalis Smith, 1853

Synonyms
- Hyleoides zonalis albocincta Cockerell, 1909; Hyleoides zonalis rufocincta Cockerell, 1909

= Hyleoides zonalis =

Species of bee

Hyleoides zonalis is a species of bee in the family Colletidae and the subfamily Hylaeinae. It is endemic to Australia. It was described in 1853 by English entomologist Frederick Smith.

== Distribution and habitat ==
The species occurs at both the eastern and western ends of mainland Australia. Type localities include Hunter River, New South Wales, and Swan River, Western Australia. It has also been recorded from Lord Howe Island in the Tasman Sea.

== Behaviour ==
The adults are flying mellivores. Flowering plants visited by the bees include Banksia, Eucalyptus and Xylomelum species.

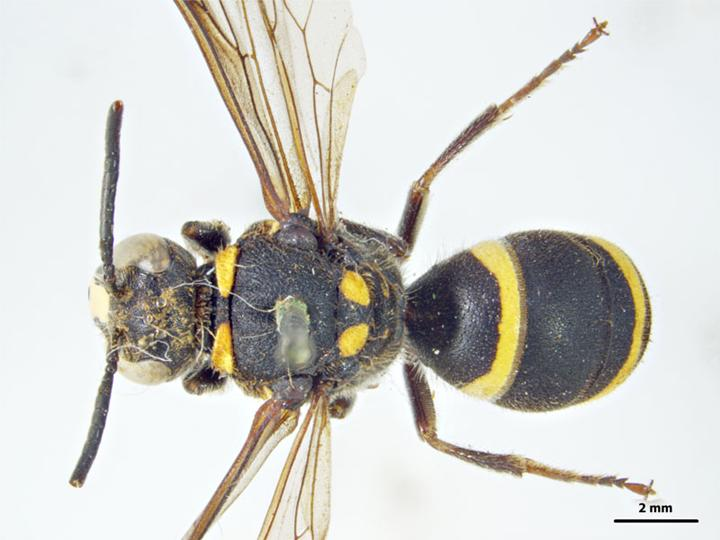
Male
