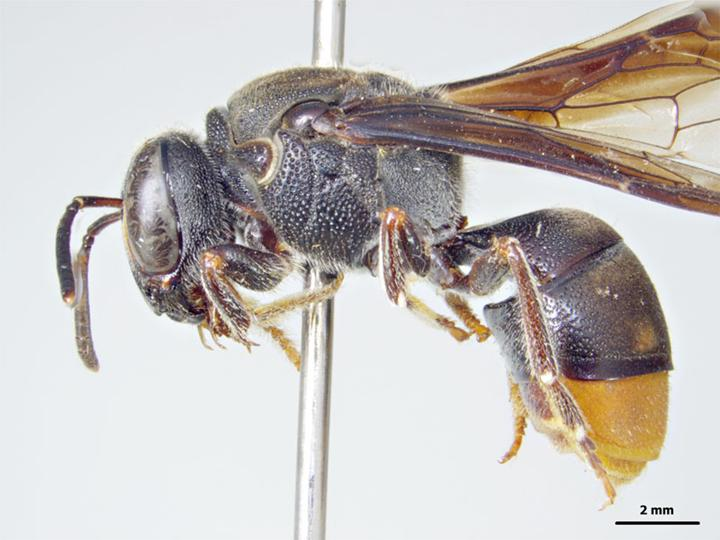
- Female

Scientific classification
- Kingdom: Animalia
- Phylum: Arthropoda
- Clade: Pancrustacea
- Class: Insecta
- Order: Hymenoptera
- Family: Colletidae
- Genus: Hyleoides
- Species: H. striatula

Binomial name
- Hyleoides striatula Cockerell, 1921

= Hyleoides striatula =

Species of bee

Hyleoides striatula is a species of bee in the family Colletidae and the subfamily Hylaeinae. It is endemic to Australia. It was described in 1921 by British-American entomologist Theodore Dru Alison Cockerell.

== Description ==
Female body length about 12 mm, forewing length 10 mm. Colouration is mainly black, reddish-brown and orange.

== Distribution and habitat ==
The species occurs in Queensland. The type locality is Kuranda.

== Behaviour ==
The adults are flying mellivores. Flowering plants visited by the bees include Angophora and Eucalyptus species.

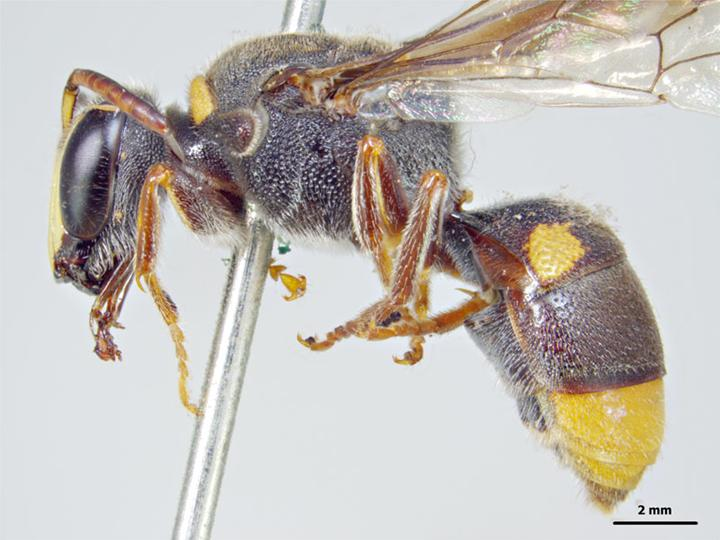
Male
