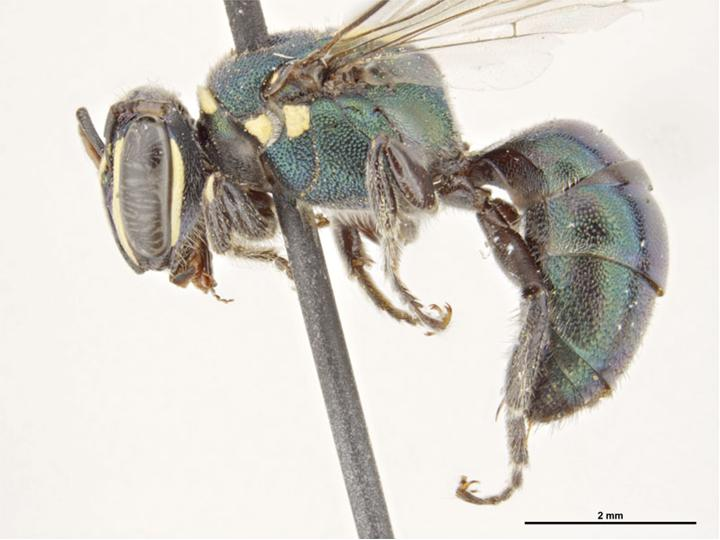
- Female

Scientific classification
- Kingdom: Animalia
- Phylum: Arthropoda
- Clade: Pancrustacea
- Class: Insecta
- Order: Hymenoptera
- Family: Colletidae
- Genus: Palaeorhiza
- Species: P. parallela

Binomial name
- Palaeorhiza parallela (Cockerell, 1905)

Synonyms
- Prosopis parallela Cockerell, 1905; Prosopis regina Friese, 1912; Prosopis regina Friese, 1924; Prosopis regina humeralis Friese, 1924; Prosopis regalis Friese, 1924; Palaeorhiza parallela optima Cockerell, 1929

= Palaeorhiza parallela =

Species of bee

Palaeorhiza parallela, or Palaeorhiza (Cnemidorhiza) parallela, also known as the parallel beautiful-masked bee, is a species of bee in the family Colletidae and subfamily Hylaeinae. It is native to Australia. It was described by British entomologist Theodore Dru Alison Cockerell in 1905.

== Distribution and habitat ==
The species occurs in coastal tropical Queensland. The type locality is Mackay.

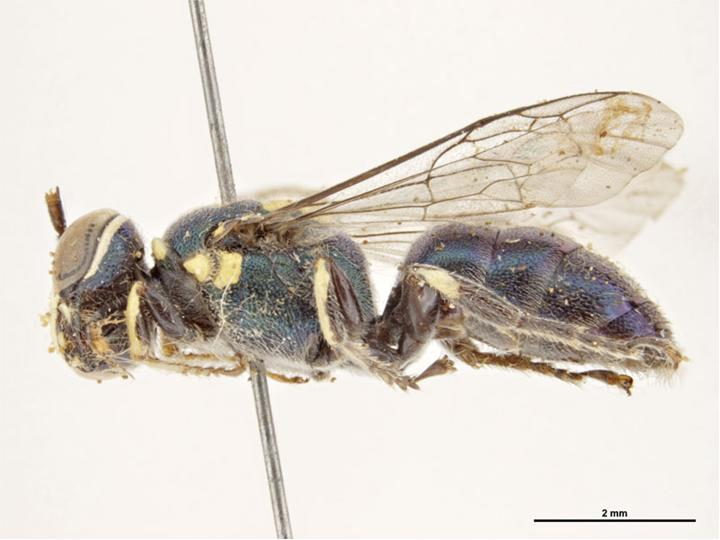
Male

On a Dillenia alata flower

== Behaviour ==
The adults are flying mellivores. Flowering plants visited by the bees include Cassia, Eucalyptus, Eugenia, Rosa and Xanthorrhoea species.
