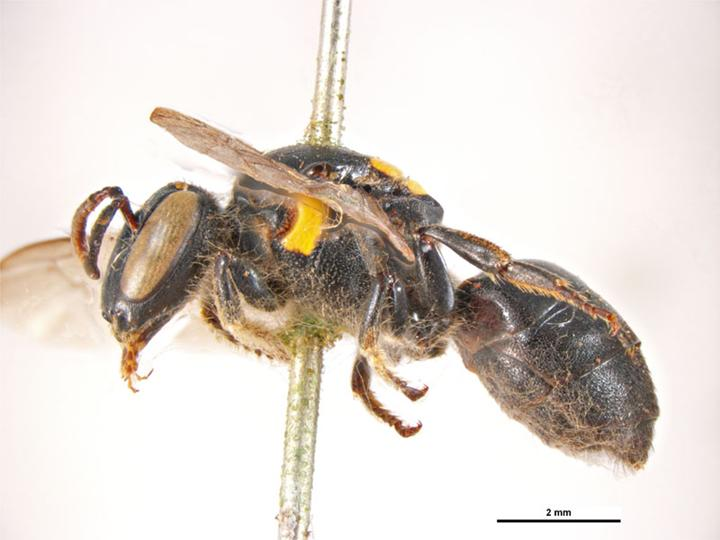
- Female

Scientific classification
- Kingdom: Animalia
- Phylum: Arthropoda
- Clade: Pancrustacea
- Class: Insecta
- Order: Hymenoptera
- Family: Colletidae
- Genus: Meroglossa
- Species: M. diversipuncta

Binomial name
- Meroglossa diversipuncta (Cockerell, 1909)

Synonyms
- Prosopis diversipuncta Cockerell, 1909

= Meroglossa diversipuncta =

Species of bee

Meroglossa diversipuncta is a species of bee in the family Colletidae and the subfamily Hylaeinae. It is endemic to Australia. It was described in 1909 by British-American entomologist Theodore Dru Alison Cockerell.

== Description ==
Female body length is about 8.5 mm. Colouration is mainly black, patched with yellow.

== Distribution and habitat ==
The species occurs in Far North Queensland. The type locality is Kuranda.

== Behaviour ==
The adults are flying mellivores.
