= Palaeorhiza disrupta =

Scientific classification
- Kingdom: Animalia
- Phylum: Arthropoda
- Clade: Pancrustacea
- Class: Insecta
- Order: Hymenoptera
- Family: Colletidae
- Genus: Palaeorhiza
- Species: P. disrupta

Binomial name
- Palaeorhiza disrupta Cockerell, 1914

Synonyms
- Palaeorhiza parallela disrupta Cockerell, 1914

Species of bee

Palaeorhiza disrupta, or Palaeorhiza (Callorhiza) disrupta, is a species of bee in the family Colletidae and subfamily Hylaeinae. It is native to Meganesia. It was described by British entomologist Theodore Dru Alison Cockerell in 1914.

== Distribution and habitat ==
The species occurs in north-eastern Australia as well as being widespread in New Guinea. The type locality is Kuranda, Queensland.

== Behaviour ==
The adults are flying mellivores. Flowering plants visited by the bees include Melastoma species.
