= Palaeorhiza varicolor =

Scientific classification
- Kingdom: Animalia
- Phylum: Arthropoda
- Clade: Pancrustacea
- Class: Insecta
- Order: Hymenoptera
- Family: Colletidae
- Genus: Palaeorhiza
- Species: P. varicolor

Binomial name
- Palaeorhiza varicolor (Smith, 1879)

Synonyms
- Prosopis varicolor Smith, 1879

Species of bee

Palaeorhiza varicolor, or Palaeorhiza (Palaeorhiza) varicolor, is a species of bee in the family Colletidae and subfamily Hylaeinae. It is endemic to Australia. It was described by British entomologist Frederick Smith in 1879.

== Distribution and habitat ==
The species occurs in coastal tropical Queensland. The type locality is Port Bowen. It has also been recorded from Townsville and Mackay.

== Behaviour ==
The adults are flying mellivores.
