= Palaeorhiza eboracina =

Scientific classification
- Kingdom: Animalia
- Phylum: Arthropoda
- Clade: Pancrustacea
- Class: Insecta
- Order: Hymenoptera
- Family: Colletidae
- Genus: Palaeorhiza
- Species: P. eboracina

Binomial name
- Palaeorhiza eboracina (Cockerell, 1910)

Synonyms
- Meroglossa varicolor eboracina Cockerell, 1910

Species of bee

Palaeorhiza eboracina, or Palaeorhiza (Callorhiza) eboracina, is a species of bee in the family Colletidae and subfamily Hylaeinae. It is endemic to Australia. It was described by British entomologist Theodore Dru Alison Cockerell in 1910.

== Distribution and habitat ==
The species occurs in tropical north-eastern Australia. The type locality is Cape York. It has also been recorded from Cairns and Kuranda, Queensland.

== Behaviour ==
The adults are flying mellivores.
