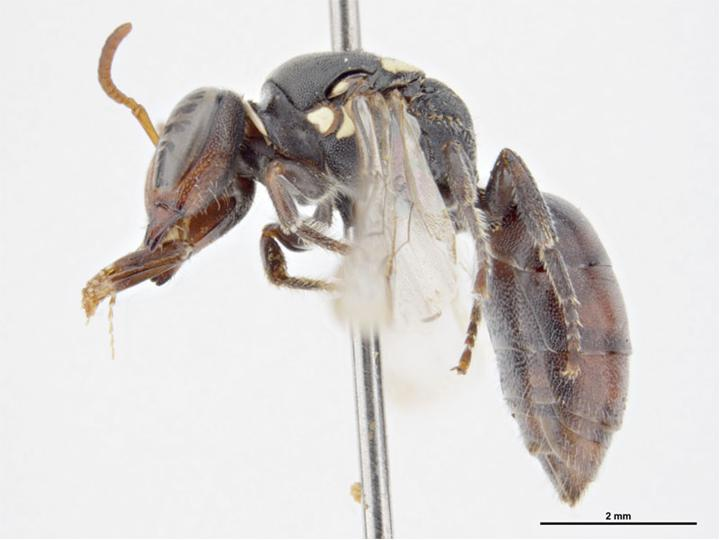
- Female

Scientific classification
- Kingdom: Animalia
- Phylum: Arthropoda
- Clade: Pancrustacea
- Class: Insecta
- Order: Hymenoptera
- Family: Colletidae
- Genus: Meroglossa
- Species: M. sculptissima

Binomial name
- Meroglossa sculptissima Cockerell, 1910

Synonyms
- Meroglossa decipiens Perkins, 1912; Meroglossa eucalypti hilli Cockerell, 1929

= Meroglossa sculptissima =

Species of bee

Meroglossa sculptissima is a species of bee in the family Colletidae and the subfamily Hylaeinae. It is endemic to Australia. It was described in 1910 by British-American entomologist Theodore Dru Alison Cockerell.

== Description ==
Male body length is about 9 mm. Colouration is mainly black with yellow and cream markings.

== Distribution and habitat ==
The species occurs in the Northern Territory and north-eastern Queensland. Type localities include Herberton and Mackay, Queensland, and Darwin, Northern Territory.

== Behaviour ==
The adults are flying mellivores. Flowering plants visited by the bees include Barringtonia, Eucalyptus and Eugenia species.

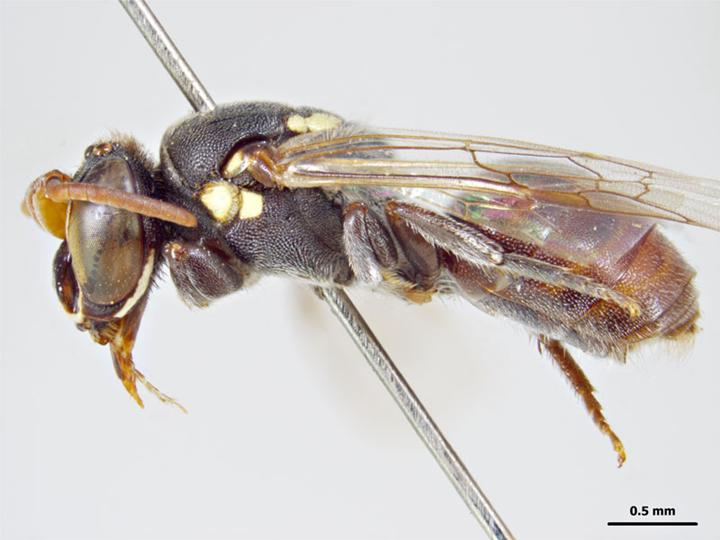
Male
