= Meroglossa setifera =

Scientific classification
- Kingdom: Animalia
- Phylum: Arthropoda
- Clade: Pancrustacea
- Class: Insecta
- Order: Hymenoptera
- Family: Colletidae
- Genus: Meroglossa
- Species: M. setifera

Binomial name
- Meroglossa setifera Houston, 1975

Species of bee

Meroglossa setifera is a species of bee in the family Colletidae and the subfamily Hylaeinae. It is endemic to Australia. It was described in 1975 by Australian entomologist Terry Houston.

== Distribution and habitat ==
The species occurs in south-eastern Australia. The type locality is 112 km north of Bourke, New South Wales.

== Behaviour ==
The adults are flying mellivores. Flowering plants visited by the bees include Eremophila and Eucalyptus species.
