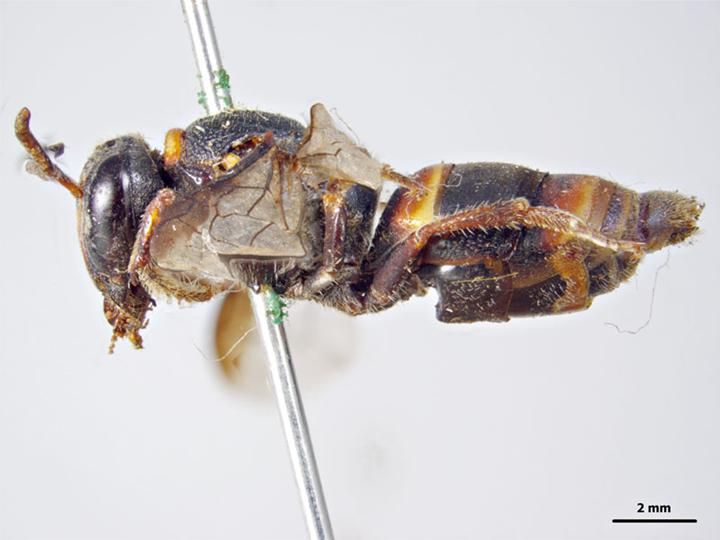
- Female

Scientific classification
- Kingdom: Animalia
- Phylum: Arthropoda
- Clade: Pancrustacea
- Class: Insecta
- Order: Hymenoptera
- Family: Colletidae
- Genus: Hyleoides
- Species: H. bivulnerata

Binomial name
- Hyleoides bivulnerata Cockerell, 1921

= Hyleoides bivulnerata =

Species of bee

Hyleoides bivulnerata is a species of bee in the family Colletidae and the subfamily Hylaeinae. It is endemic to Australia. It was described in 1921 by British-American entomologist Theodore Dru Alison Cockerell.

== Description ==
Female body length is about 11 mm. Colouration is mainly black and red with cream markings.

== Distribution and habitat ==
The species occurs in eastern Australia. The type locality is Darra, Queensland.

== Behaviour ==
The adults are flying mellivores. Flowering plants visited by the bees include Callistemon and Melaleuca species.

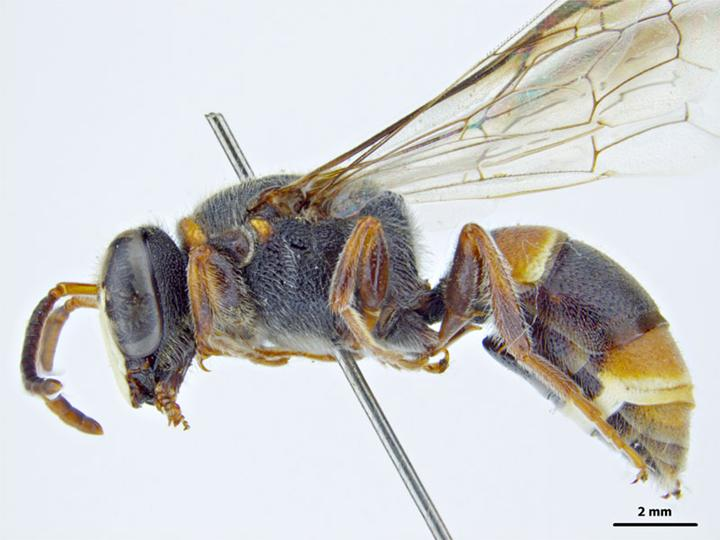
Male
