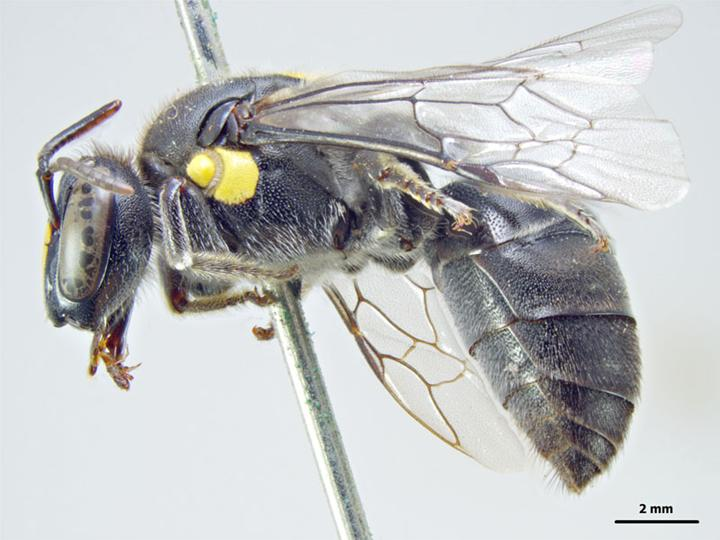
- Female

Scientific classification
- Kingdom: Animalia
- Phylum: Arthropoda
- Clade: Pancrustacea
- Class: Insecta
- Order: Hymenoptera
- Family: Colletidae
- Genus: Meroglossa
- Species: M. punctata

Binomial name
- Meroglossa punctata Rayment, 1935

Synonyms
- Meroglossa desponsa punctata Rayment, 1935

= Meroglossa punctata =

Species of bee

Meroglossa punctata is a species of bee in the family Colletidae and the subfamily Hylaeinae. It is endemic to Australia. It was described in 1935 by Australian entomologist Tarlton Rayment.

== Description ==
Body length of the female holotype is 10 mm. The colour is mainly black, with a yellow spot.

== Distribution and habitat ==
The species occurs in south-eastern Queensland. The type locality is Brisbane.

== Behaviour ==
The adults are flying mellivores. Flowering plants visited by the bees include Leptospermum and Lomatia species.
