= Palaeorhiza reginarum =

Scientific classification
- Kingdom: Animalia
- Phylum: Arthropoda
- Clade: Pancrustacea
- Class: Insecta
- Order: Hymenoptera
- Family: Colletidae
- Genus: Palaeorhiza
- Species: P. reginarum

Binomial name
- Palaeorhiza reginarum (Cockerell, 1905)

Synonyms
- Prosopis reginarum Cockerell, 1905

Species of bee

Palaeorhiza reginarum, or Palaeorhiza (Palaeorhiza) reginarum, is a species of bee in the family Colletidae and subfamily Hylaeinae. It is endemic to Australia. It was described by British entomologist Theodore Dru Alison Cockerell in 1905.

== Distribution and habitat ==
The species occurs in coastal eastern Australia. The type locality is Mackay, Queensland. It has also been recorded from Brisbane and Stradbroke Island.

== Behaviour ==
The adults are flying mellivores. Flowering plants visited by the bees include Cassia species.
