= Meroglossa borchi =

Scientific classification
- Kingdom: Animalia
- Phylum: Arthropoda
- Clade: Pancrustacea
- Class: Insecta
- Order: Hymenoptera
- Family: Colletidae
- Genus: Meroglossa
- Species: M. borchi

Binomial name
- Meroglossa borchi Rayment, 1939

Synonyms
- Meroglossa desponsa borchi Rayment, 1939

Species of bee

Meroglossa borchi is a species of bee in the family Colletidae and the subfamily Hylaeinae. It is endemic to Australia. It was described in 1939 by Australian entomologist Tarlton Rayment.

== Description ==
Body length is about 10 mm. The colour is mainly black, with yellow markings.

== Distribution and habitat ==
The species occurs in Victoria. The type locality is the Grampians range.

== Behaviour ==
The adults are flying mellivores.
