= Palaeorhiza viridimutans =

Scientific classification
- Kingdom: Animalia
- Phylum: Arthropoda
- Clade: Pancrustacea
- Class: Insecta
- Order: Hymenoptera
- Family: Colletidae
- Genus: Palaeorhiza
- Species: P. viridimutans

Binomial name
- Palaeorhiza viridimutans (Cockerell, 1910)

Synonyms
- Meroglossa turneriana viridimutans Cockerell, 1910

Species of bee

Palaeorhiza viridimutans, or Palaeorhiza (Callorhiza) viridimutans, is a species of bee in the family Colletidae and subfamily Hylaeinae. It is endemic to Australia. It was described by British entomologist Theodore Dru Alison Cockerell in 1910.

== Distribution and habitat ==
The species occurs in tropical northern Australia. The type locality is Darwin, Northern Territory.

== Behaviour ==
The adults are flying mellivores.
