= Palaeorhiza perkinsi =

Scientific classification
- Kingdom: Animalia
- Phylum: Arthropoda
- Clade: Pancrustacea
- Class: Insecta
- Order: Hymenoptera
- Family: Colletidae
- Genus: Palaeorhiza
- Species: P. perkinsi

Binomial name
- Palaeorhiza perkinsi Cockerell, 1910

Species of bee

Palaeorhiza perkinsi, or Palaeorhiza (Palaeorhiza) perkinsi, is a species of bee in the family Colletidae and subfamily Hylaeinae. It is endemic to Australia. It was described by British entomologist Theodore Dru Alison Cockerell in 1910.

== Distribution and habitat ==
The species occurs in tropical Queensland. The type locality is given simply as North Queensland, but it has been recorded from Cooktown.

== Behaviour ==
The adults are flying mellivores.
