= Palaeorhiza hedleyi =

Scientific classification
- Kingdom: Animalia
- Phylum: Arthropoda
- Clade: Pancrustacea
- Class: Insecta
- Order: Hymenoptera
- Family: Colletidae
- Genus: Palaeorhiza
- Species: P. hedleyi

Binomial name
- Palaeorhiza hedleyi Cockerell, 1929

Species of bee

Palaeorhiza hedleyi, or Palaeorhiza (Heterorhiza) hedleyi, is a species of bee in the family Colletidae and subfamily Hylaeinae. It is native to Australia. It was described by British entomologist Theodore Dru Alison Cockerell in 1929.

== Description ==
The body length of the holotype male is 9 mm. Integumental colouration is mainly black with light yellow markings.

== Distribution and habitat ==
The species occurs in tropical Far North Queensland. The type locality is Murray Island in Torres Strait.

== Behaviour ==
The adults are flying mellivores.
