= Palaeorhiza rejecta =

Scientific classification
- Kingdom: Animalia
- Phylum: Arthropoda
- Clade: Pancrustacea
- Class: Insecta
- Order: Hymenoptera
- Family: Colletidae
- Genus: Palaeorhiza
- Species: P. rejecta

Binomial name
- Palaeorhiza rejecta Cockerell, 1929

Synonyms
- Palaeorhiza disrupta rejecta Cockerell, 1929

Species of bee

Palaeorhiza rejecta, or Palaeorhiza (Cnemidorhiza) rejecta, is a species of bee in the family Colletidae and subfamily Hylaeinae. It is endemic to Australia. It was described by British entomologist Theodore Dru Alison Cockerell in 1929.

== Distribution and habitat ==
The species occurs in tropical Far North Queensland. The type locality is Cairns.

== Behaviour ==
The adults are flying mellivores.
