= Palaeorhiza purpureocincta =

Scientific classification
- Kingdom: Animalia
- Phylum: Arthropoda
- Clade: Pancrustacea
- Class: Insecta
- Order: Hymenoptera
- Family: Colletidae
- Genus: Palaeorhiza
- Species: P. purpureocincta

Binomial name
- Palaeorhiza purpureocincta Cockerell, 1926

Species of bee

Palaeorhiza purpureocincta, or Palaeorhiza (Palaeorhiza) purpureocincta, is a species of bee in the family Colletidae and subfamily Hylaeinae. It is endemic to Australia. It was described by British entomologist Theodore Dru Alison Cockerell in 1926.

== Distribution and habitat ==
The species occurs in north-eastern Australia. The type locality is the Endeavour River, on the Cape York Peninsula in Far North Queensland.

== Behaviour ==
The adults are flying mellivores.
