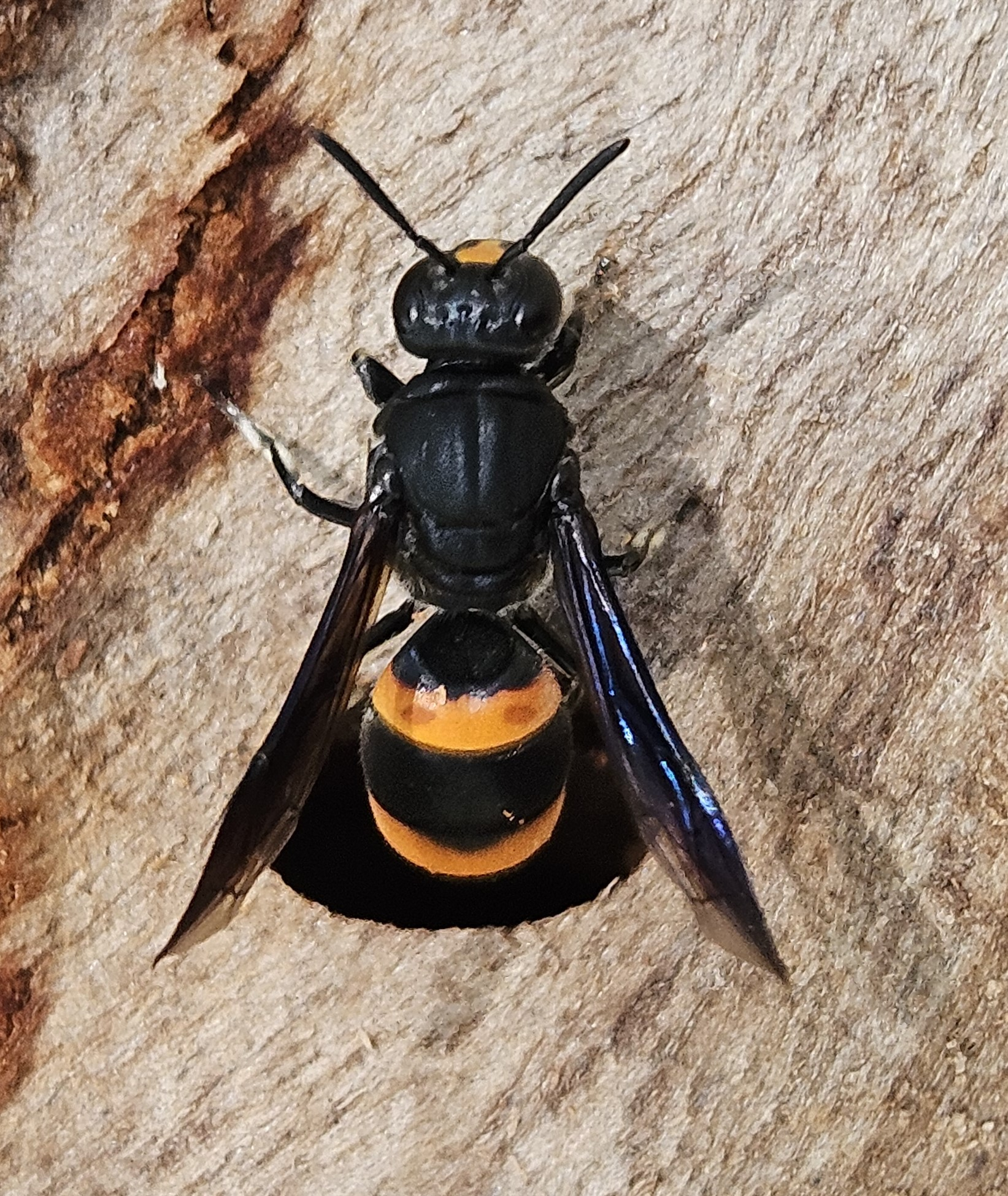

Scientific classification
- Kingdom: Animalia
- Phylum: Arthropoda
- Clade: Pancrustacea
- Class: Insecta
- Order: Hymenoptera
- Family: Colletidae
- Genus: Hyleoides
- Species: H. concinna

Binomial name
- Hyleoides concinna (Fabricius, 1775)

= Hyleoides concinna =

Species of solitary bee

Hyleoides concinna, the common wasp-mimic bee, is a species of solitary bee in the family Colletidae. It was first described in 1775 by Johan Christian Fabricius, who mistook it for a wasp. It is native to south-eastern Australia, and has accidentally been introduced to New Zealand. The abdomen is orange and black on top, with a yellow band underneath. Nests are constructed in pre-existing cavities in wood, such as the tunnels produced by longhorn beetle larvae. It collects nectar and pollen from a wide range of flowering plant species.

== Taxonomy ==
The common wasp-mimic bee was first described by Danish zoologist Johan Christian Fabricius, who (believing it to be a wasp) named it Vespa concinna in 1775. The specific name (concinna) is a Latin word meaning "beautiful". The holotype specimen is a female, which is stored in the Natural History Museum, London. It was collected by Joseph Banks during the first voyage of James Cook. This expedition was the first time Europeans had visited the eastern coastline of Australia.

== Description ==
The common wasp-mimic bee has evolved several features that make it look like a potter wasp. These features include a bold colour pattern, partly darkened forewings, and a habit of holding the wings out in a V-shape when alighting. Wasps tend to be more aggressive than bees, so it's believed this mimicry might serve to frighten away predators. This bee can be distinguished from the potter wasps they mimic by the presence of small tufts of branched hairs on the thorax and longitudinally-folded wings.

The second abdominal segment is black, and the remaining segments are mostly orange on top. There is a yellow band under the third abdominal segment. The thorax is black, sometimes with orange spots. The head is black. Males and females can be differentiated by the shape and colour of markings on the clypeus – yellow in the male, and orange (narrowing below) in the female. Males are 10 to 12 mm (0.39 to 0.47 in) in length. Females are usually slightly larger at 12 to 13 mm (0.47 to 0.51 in).

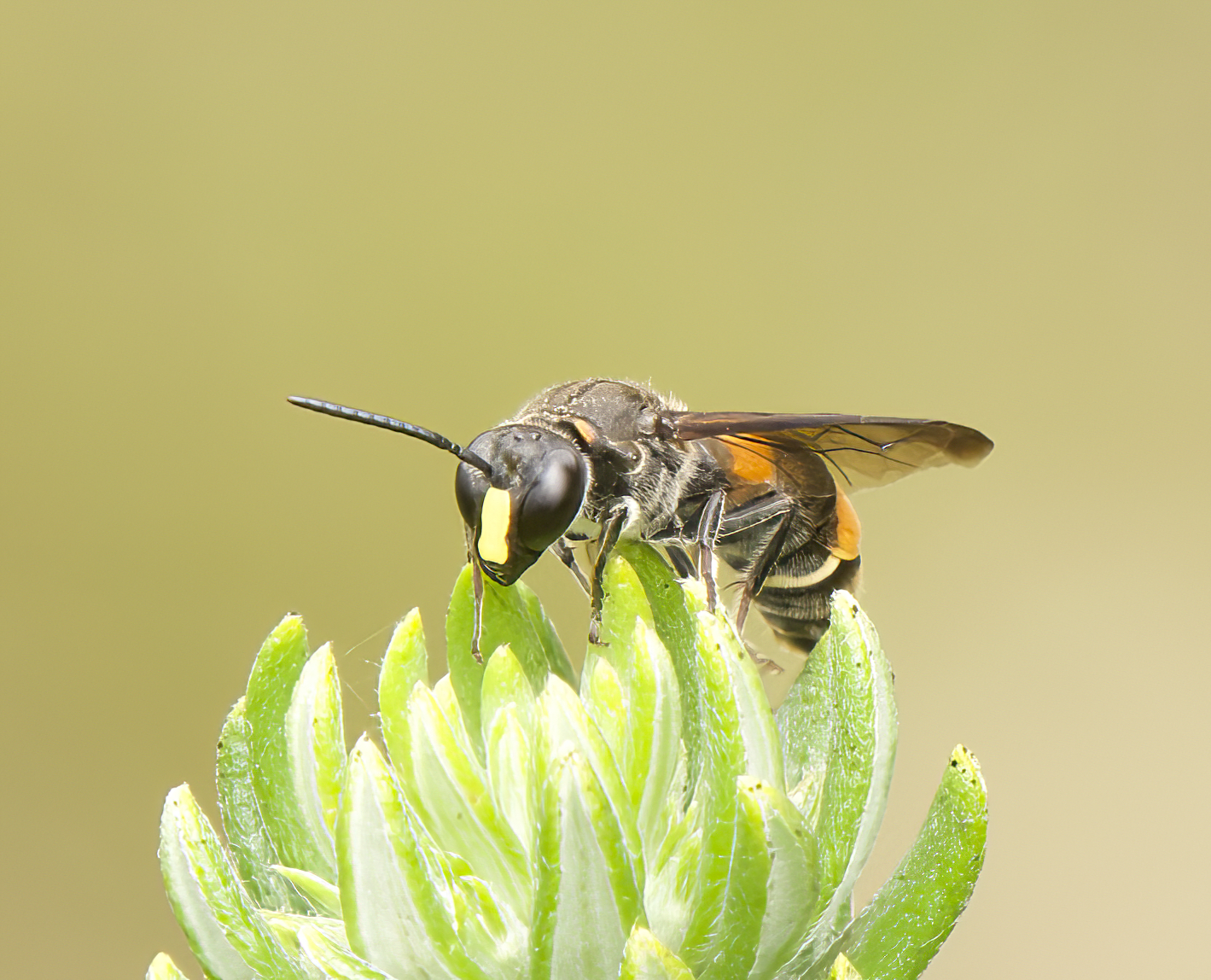
Hyleoides concinna male

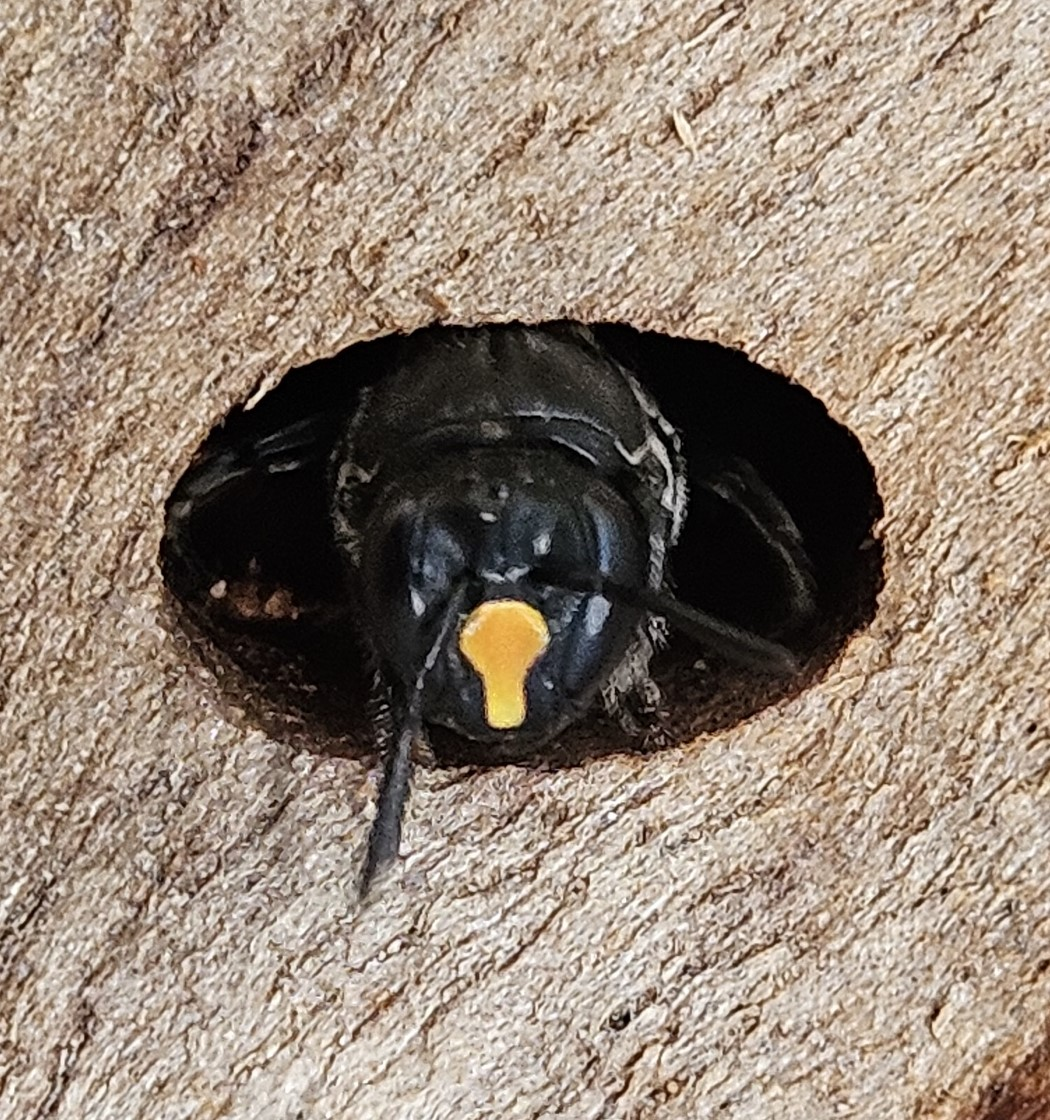
Hyleoides concinna female

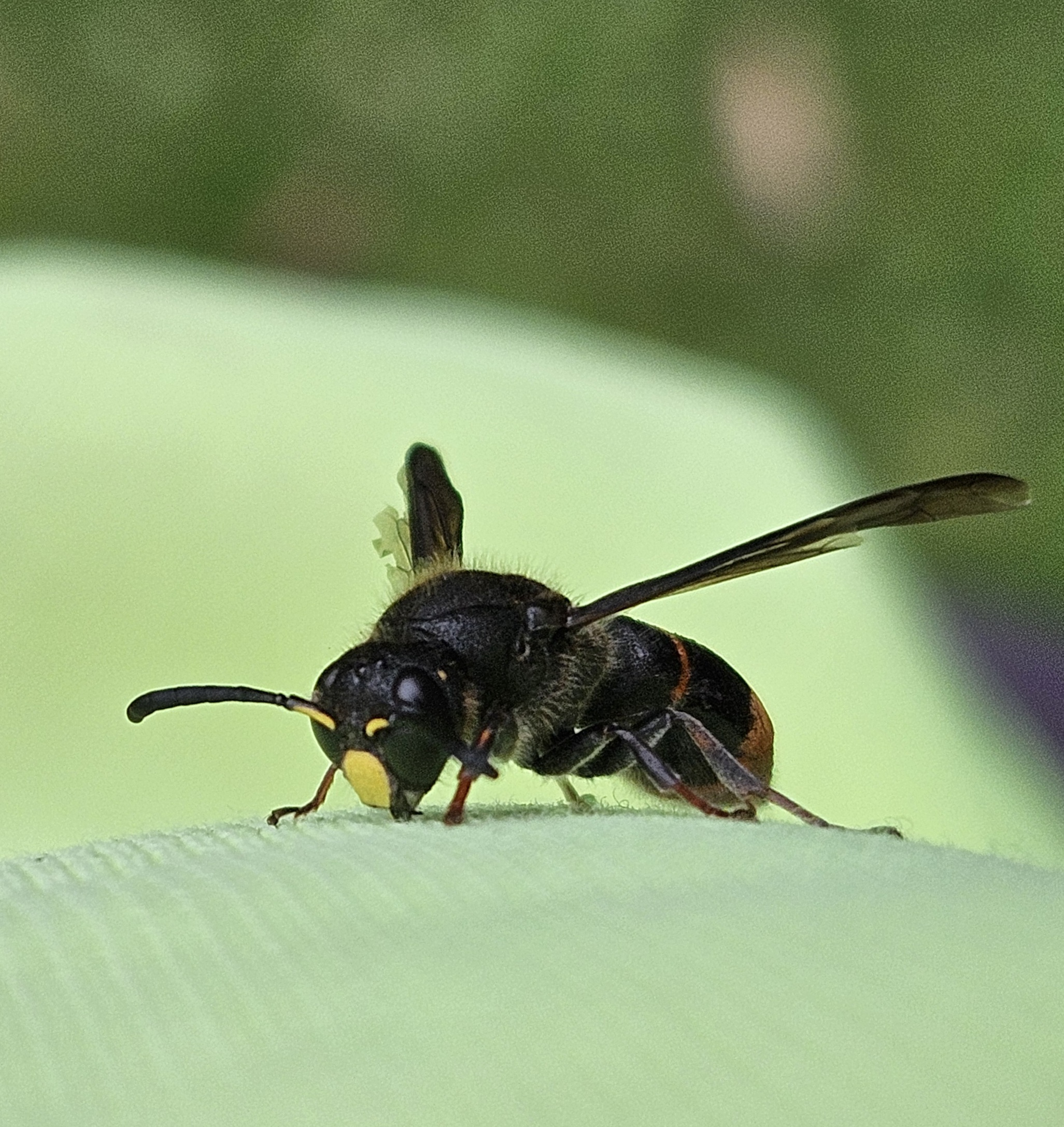
Potter wasp model: Paralastor sp. (Eumeninae)

== Distribution and habitat ==
The common wasp-mimic bee lives in urban areas, woodlands, forests and heath. It is native to south-eastern Australia, with records from South Australia (including Kangaroo Island), Victoria, Tasmania, the Australian Capital Territory, New South Wales and southern Queensland.

It was accidentally introduced to the North Island of New Zealand some time before 1980. It is believed that it entered the country as diapausing prepupae in nests in imported timber. This was likely via the ports of Gisborne and Napier. By 2021 it had reached the South Island of New Zealand, and it is expected to spread to the rest of the country, which has a suitable climate for this species.

== Behaviour and ecology ==
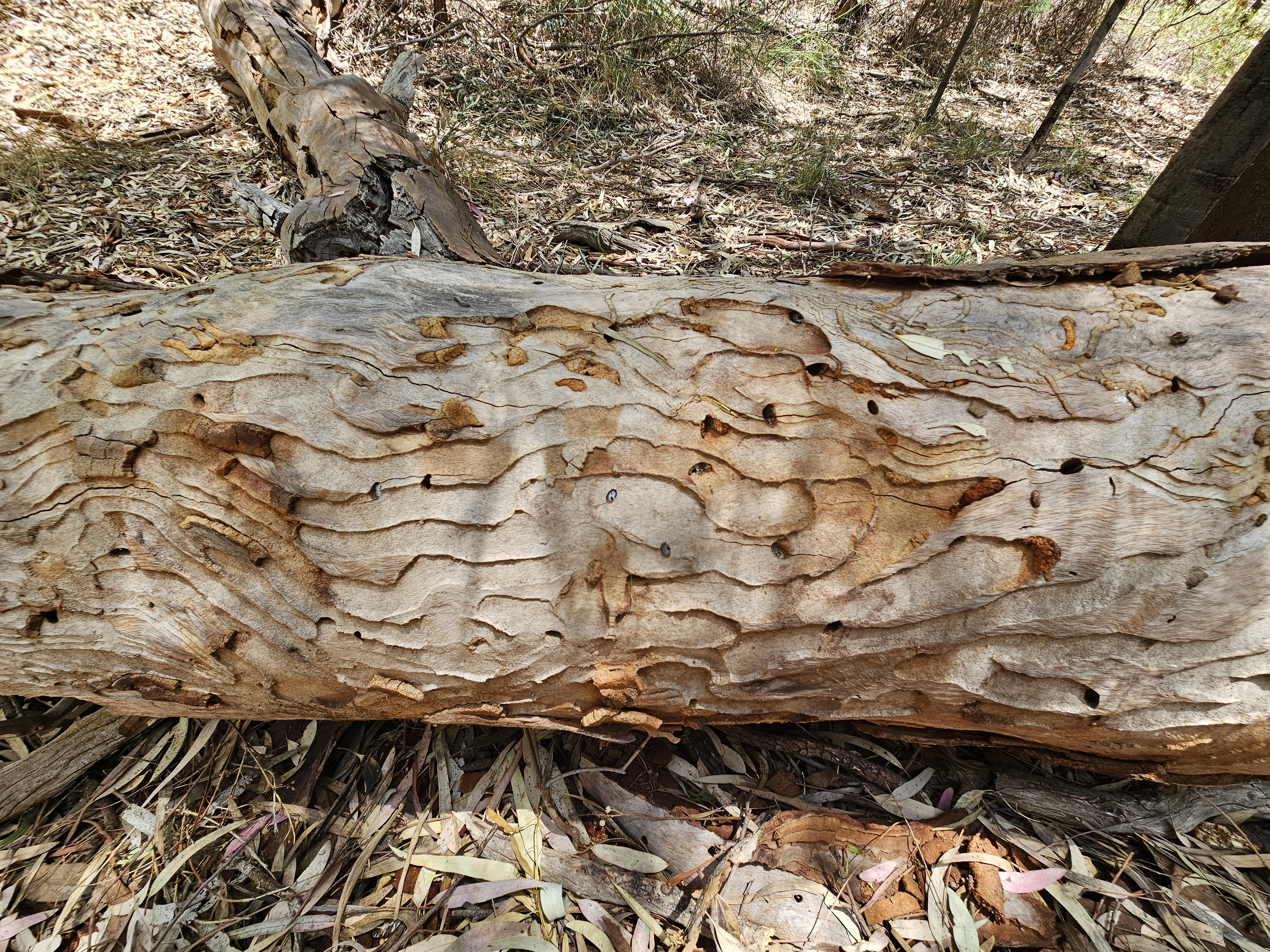
Log being used for nesting

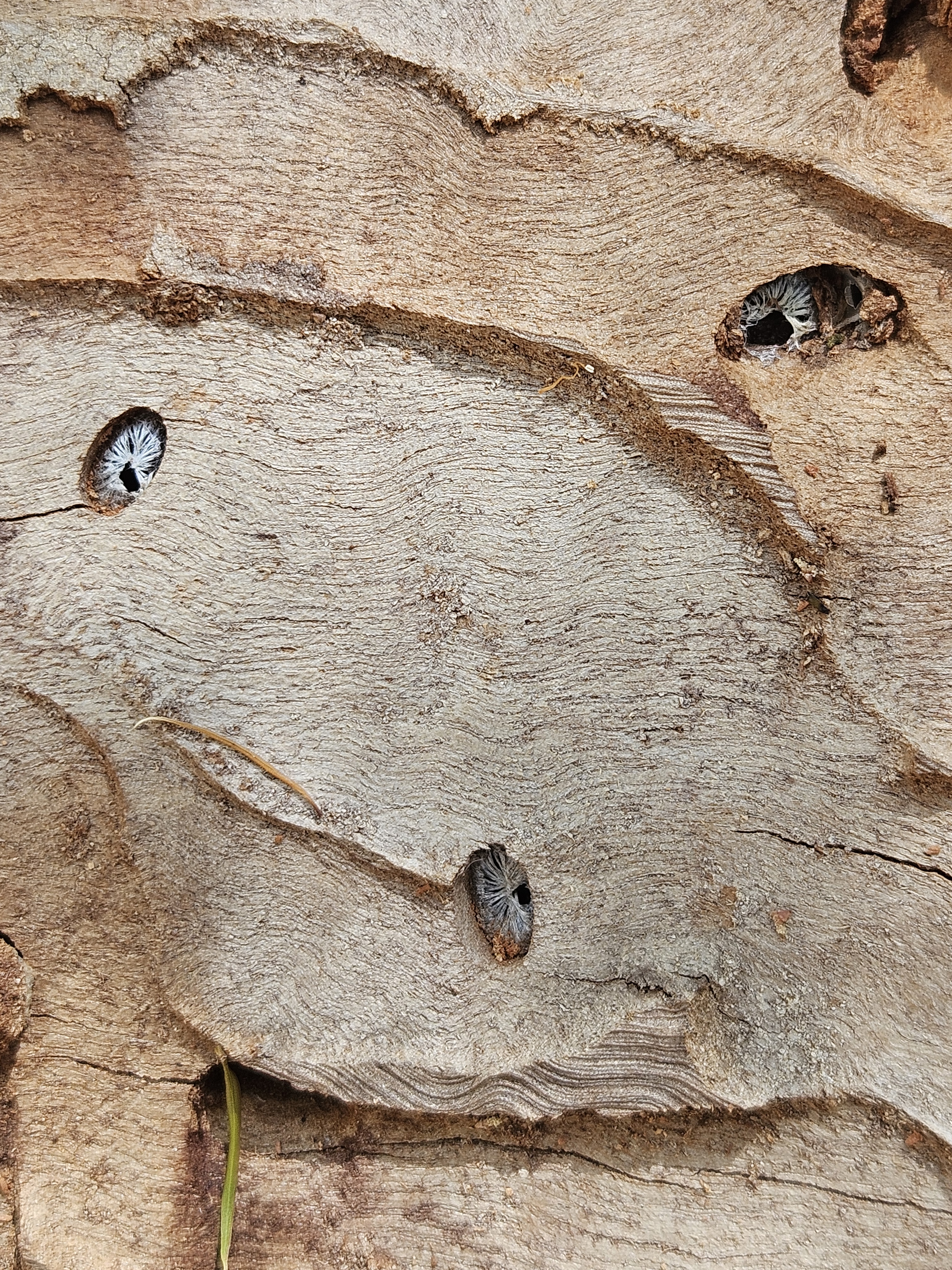
Hyleoides concinna nests in holes that were created by borer insects (likely longhorn beetle larvae). A curtain of cellophane-like material is visible at the entrance of each nest.

The common wasp-mimic bee is solitary, and it has one brood per year. Females construct nests in summer in pre-existing cavities, such as the tunnels made in wood by longhorn beetle larvae. This bee will also nest in man-made cavities, such as drilled timber holes and bamboo canes in bee hotels. The preferred cavity diameter is 6 to 8 millimetres.

Females begin nesting by building a curtain of silk threads over the entrance. The threads are made from a cellophane-like material secreted by the bee. The threads are attached to the walls of the hole, but are free in the centre allowing the female to easily move through. This curtain is probably a visual deterrent to parasitoid insects. The female can often be seen resting behind the curtain with only her antennae protruding through.

After constructing the curtain, she creates a series of brood cells using more of the waterproof cellophane-like material. Each cell is half-filled with a provision of nectar and pollen, and an egg is laid upon each provision. The females of this species carry the pollen internally, as they lack the external pollen-carrying structures of many other bees. Up to eight cells may be provisioned and closed before the female seals the entire nest with a solid wall to protect against predators.

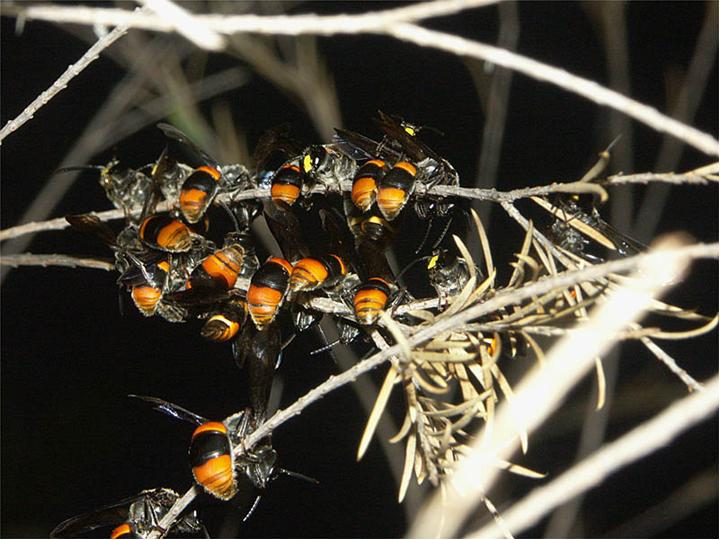
Male roosting aggregation

The larvae consume the provisions and pupate, emerging as adults the following spring. In Australia, adults can be seen from October to March (based on records from the Sydney region). In New Zealand the adults are most active from November to March.

The common wasp-mimic bee has been recorded visiting a wide range of flowers, including those from the following genera; Angophora, Callistemon, Eucalyptus, Lophostemon, Banksia, Daviesia, Jacksonia, Melaleuca, Brachychiton, Eremophila, Lambertia, Persoonia, Pultenaea, Leucospermum, Saponaria, Chrysanthemum, Tecoma, Bursaria, Foeniculum and Acmena. It tends to forage on flowers slower than honeybees and wasps, which helps to distinguish it in flight.

Males are known to form roosting aggregations on branches or twigs. Females can sting, but they are not aggressive, and will only sting humans if pressed against the skin.

== In culture ==
This was one of four species featured in a set of native bee postage stamps, which were available from Australia Post in 2019.
