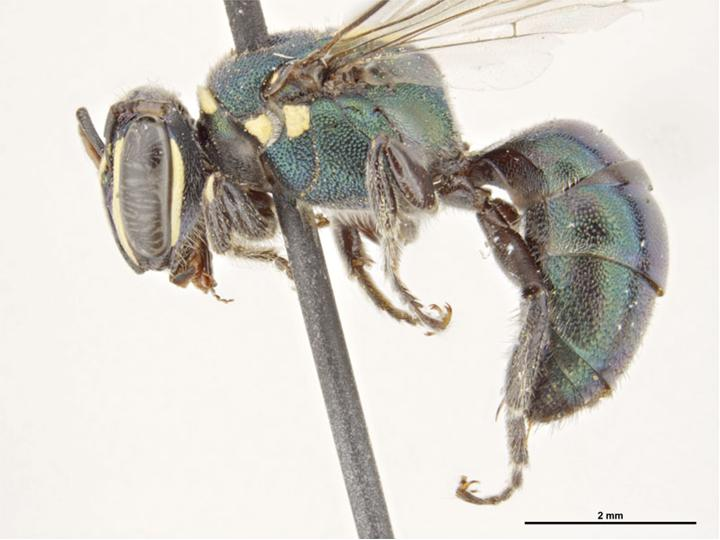
- Palaeorhiza parallela

Scientific classification
- Kingdom: Animalia
- Phylum: Arthropoda
- Clade: Pancrustacea
- Class: Insecta
- Order: Hymenoptera
- Family: Colletidae
- Subfamily: Hylaeinae
- Genus: Palaeorhiza; Perkins, 1908

= Palaeorhiza =

Genus of bees

Palaeorhiza is a genus of bees belonging to the family Colletidae and the subfamily Hylaeinae. The species are found in Australia, New Guinea, the Solomon Islands and New Caledonia.

== Species ==
- Palaeorhiza abdominalis Hirashima, 1978
- Palaeorhiza aemula Hirashima & Lieftinck, 1982
- Palaeorhiza aenea Hirashima & Lieftinck, 1983
- Palaeorhiza affinis Hirashima & Lieftinck, 1982
- Palaeorhiza agrias Hirashima, 1989
- Palaeorhiza albopicta Hirashima, 1989
- Palaeorhiza amabilis Hirashima, 1981
- Palaeorhiza amoena Hirashima, 1981
- Palaeorhiza angusta Hirashima, 1975
- Palaeorhiza anthracina Hirashima & Lieftinck, 1982
- Palaeorhiza apicata (Smith, 1863)
- Palaeorhiza attractans Hirashima, 1989
- Palaeorhiza bagudai Cheesman, 1948
- Palaeorhiza basilura Cockerell, 1910
- Palaeorhiza bicolor Hirashima & Lieftinck, 1982
- Palaeorhiza bicolorata Hirashima & Lieftinck, 1983
- Palaeorhiza caerulescens (Friese, 1924)
- Palaeorhiza callima Hirashima, 1988
- Palaeorhiza callimoides Hirashima, 1988
- Palaeorhiza capitata Hirashima & Lieftinck, 1983
- Palaeorhiza cassiaefloris (Cockerell, 1910)
- Palaeorhiza chimbuensis Hirashima, 1982
- Palaeorhiza cockerelli Hirashima & Lieftinck, 1983
- Palaeorhiza combinata Hirashima, 1978
- Palaeorhiza concorda Cheesman, 1948
- Palaeorhiza conica Michener, 1965
- Palaeorhiza convexa Hirashima, 1981
- Palaeorhiza cuprea Hirashima, 1988
- Palaeorhiza cyanea Hirashima, 1981
- Palaeorhiza cylindrica Hirashima, 1975
- Palaeorhiza decorata Hirashima & Lieftinck, 1982
- Palaeorhiza delicata Hirashima, 1981
- Palaeorhiza denticauda (Cockerell, 1910)
- Palaeorhiza disrupta Cockerell, 1914
- Palaeorhiza distincta Hirashima & Lieftinck, 1983
- Palaeorhiza dorsalis Hirashima, 1982
- Palaeorhiza eboracina (Cockerell, 1910)
- Palaeorhiza elegantissima (Dalla Torre, 1896)
- Palaeorhiza enixa (Cheesman, 1948)
- Palaeorhiza eugenes Hirashima, 1988
- Palaeorhiza eugenoides Hirashima, 1988
- Palaeorhiza eumorpha Hirashima, 1988
- Palaeorhiza excavata Hirashima & Abe, 1996
- Palaeorhiza eximia (Smith, 1861)
- Palaeorhiza facialis Hirashima & Lieftinck, 1982
- Palaeorhiza falcifera Hirashima & Lieftinck, 1983
- Palaeorhiza ferruginea (Friese, 1911)
- Palaeorhiza flavescens Hirashima & Lieftinck, 1982
- Palaeorhiza flavipennis Hirashima, 1978
- Palaeorhiza flavipes Hirashima, 1988
- Palaeorhiza flavomellea Cockerell, 1910
- Palaeorhiza formosa Hirashima, 1981
- Palaeorhiza fulva Cheesman, 1948
- Palaeorhiza fulvago Hirashima, 1989
- Palaeorhiza gloriosa Hirashima & Lieftinck, 1983
- Palaeorhiza grandis Hirashima & Lieftinck, 1982
- Palaeorhiza gressitorum Hirashima, 1975
- Palaeorhiza hedleyi Cockerell, 1929
- Palaeorhiza helena Hirashima & Roberts, 1984
- Palaeorhiza heterochroa Hirashima, 1988
- Palaeorhiza hilara Cheesman, 1948
- Palaeorhiza imperialis (Smith, 1863)
- Palaeorhiza infuscata Michener, 1965
- Palaeorhiza jutefae Cheesman, 1948
- Palaeorhiza kraussi Hirashima, 1981
- Palaeorhiza kurandensis (Cockerell, 1909)
- Palaeorhiza laevis Hirashima, 1982
- Palaeorhiza latifacies Hirashima, 1988
- Palaeorhiza lieftincki Hirashima, 1975
- Palaeorhiza longiceps (Friese, 1924)
- Palaeorhiza lusoria (Smith, 1863)
- Palaeorhiza luxuriosa (Cockerell, 1910)
- Palaeorhiza malachisis (Smith, 1859)
- Palaeorhiza maluae Cheesman, 1948
- Palaeorhiza mandibularis Michener, 1965
- Palaeorhiza melanosoma Hirashima, 1982
- Palaeorhiza melanura Cockerell, 1910
- Palaeorhiza melina Hirashima & Lieftinck, 1982
- Palaeorhiza micheneri Hirashima, 1989
- Palaeorhiza miranda Hirashima, 1978
- Palaeorhiza misoolensis Hirashima & Lieftinck, 1982
- Palaeorhiza moluccensis Hirashima & Lieftinck, 1982
- Palaeorhiza montana Hirashima, 1978
- Palaeorhiza nana Hirashima & Lieftinck, 1983
- Palaeorhiza nasalis Hirashima, 1981
- Palaeorhiza nigra Hirashima & Lieftinck, 1983
- Palaeorhiza nigrescens Hirashima, 1982
- Palaeorhiza nitens Hirashima & Lieftinck, 1982
- Palaeorhiza odyneroides Hirashima, 1988
- Palaeorhiza papuana (Meade-Waldo, 1914)
- Palaeorhiza paracylindrica Hirashima & Lieftinck, 1983
- Palaeorhiza paradisea Hirashima, 1978
- Palaeorhiza paradoxa Hirashima, 1975
- Palaeorhiza parallela (Cockerell, 1905)
- Palaeorhiza paris Hirashima & Roberts, 1984
- Palaeorhiza parva Hirashima, 1975
- Palaeorhiza parvula Hirashima, 1981
- Palaeorhiza pembertoni Hirashima, 1981
- Palaeorhiza perkinsi Cockerell, 1910
- Palaeorhiza permiranda (Cockerell, 1909)
- Palaeorhiza pernigra Hirashima, 1978
- Palaeorhiza persimilis Hirashima, 1983
- Palaeorhiza perviridis (Cockerell, 1905)
- Palaeorhiza polita Hirashima & Lieftinck, 1983
- Palaeorhiza priamus Hirashima & Roberts, 1984
- Palaeorhiza pulchella Hirashima, 1982
- Palaeorhiza pullata Hirashima & Lieftinck, 1982
- Palaeorhiza punctata Hirashima & Lieftinck, 1983
- Palaeorhiza purpurea Hirashima, 1978
- Palaeorhiza purpureocincta Cockerell, 1926
- Palaeorhiza purpureoventris Hirashima, 1975
- Palaeorhiza recessiva Cockerell, 1912
- Palaeorhiza rectituda Cheesman, 1948
- Palaeorhiza reginarum (Cockerell, 1905)
- Palaeorhiza rejecta Cockerell, 1929
- Palaeorhiza robusta Hirashima & Lieftinck, 1983
- Palaeorhiza rubrifrons Hirashima, 1979
- Palaeorhiza rufescens Hirashima & Lieftinck, 1982
- Palaeorhiza rugosa Hirashima, 1980
- Palaeorhiza samuelsoni Hirashima, 1989
- Palaeorhiza sanguinea Hirashima, 1982
- Palaeorhiza sculpturalis Hirashima, 1978
- Palaeorhiza sedlaceki Hirashima, 1982
- Palaeorhiza senilis Hirashima, 1988
- Palaeorhiza simillima Hirashima & Lieftinck, 1982
- Palaeorhiza simulans Hirashima, 1980
- Palaeorhiza speciosa Hirashima, 1981
- Palaeorhiza spectabilis Hirashima & Roberts, 1984
- Palaeorhiza stellaris Hirashima & Roberts, 1984
- Palaeorhiza stygica Michener, 1965
- Palaeorhiza subcrassiceps Hirashima & Lieftinck, 1983
- Palaeorhiza subhyalina Hirashima & Lieftinck, 1983
- Palaeorhiza terrestris Hirashima, 1982
- Palaeorhiza tetraxantha (Cockerell, 1911)
- Palaeorhiza tricolor Hirashima, 1988
- Palaeorhiza trigona Hirashima & Lieftinck, 1983
- Palaeorhiza turneriana (Cockerell, 1905)
- Palaeorhiza variabilis Hirashima, 1981
- Palaeorhiza varicolor (Smith, 1879)
- Palaeorhiza variegata Hirashima, 1982
- Palaeorhiza violacella Michener, 1965
- Palaeorhiza virescens Hirashima, 1981
- Palaeorhiza viridiceps Hirashima & Lieftinck, 1983
- Palaeorhiza viridifrons Cockerell, 1921
- Palaeorhiza viridimutans (Cockerell, 1910)
- Palaeorhiza wisselmerenensis Hirashima, 1975
