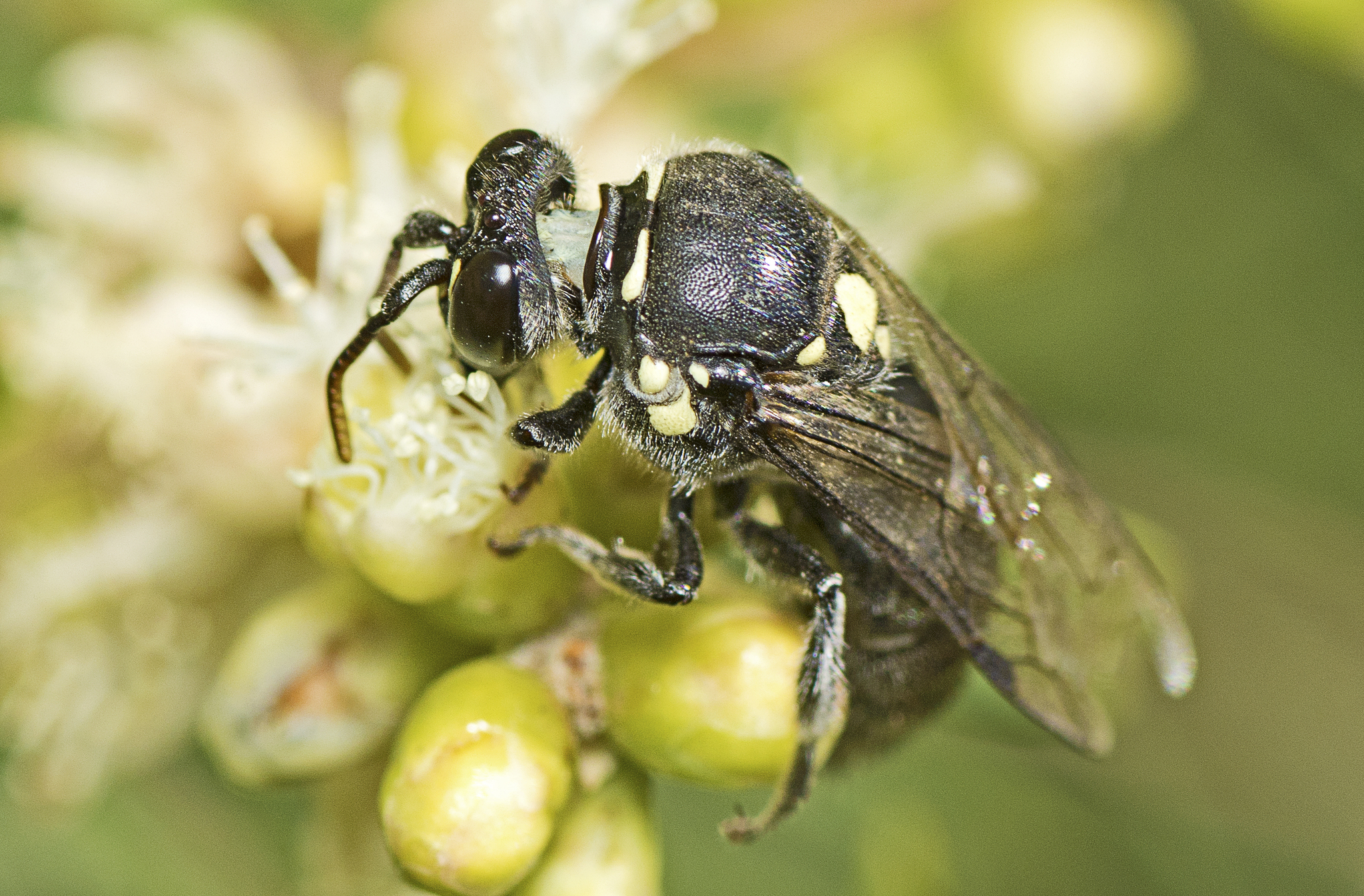
- Meroglossa impressifrons

Scientific classification
- Kingdom: Animalia
- Phylum: Arthropoda
- Clade: Pancrustacea
- Class: Insecta
- Order: Hymenoptera
- Superfamily: Apoidea
- Clade: Anthophila
- Family: Colletidae
- Subfamily: Hylaeinae
- Genus: Meroglossa; Smith, 1853

= Meroglossa =

Genus of bees

Meroglossa is a genus of bees in the family Colletidae and the subfamily Hylaeinae. It is endemic to Australia. It was described in 1853 by English entomologist Frederick Smith, and reviewed in 1975 by Australian entomologist Terry Houston.

== Species ==
As of 2026 the genus contained 20 valid species:

- Meroglossa borchi Rayment, 1939
- Meroglossa canaliculata Smith, 1853
- Meroglossa diversipuncta (Cockerell, 1909)
- Meroglossa eucalypti Cockerell, 1910
- Meroglossa ferruginea Houston, 1975
- Meroglossa gemmata Houston, 1975
- Meroglossa impressifrons (Smith, 1853)
- Meroglossa itamuca (Cockerell, 1910)
- Meroglossa modesta Houston, 1975
- Meroglossa ocellata Michener, 1965
- Meroglossa plumifera Houston, 1975
- Meroglossa punctata Rayment, 1935
- Meroglossa rubricata (Smith, 1879)
- Meroglossa rugosa Houston, 1975
- Meroglossa sculptissima Cockerell, 1910
- Meroglossa setifera Houston, 1975
- Meroglossa soror Perkins, 1912
- Meroglossa striaticeps (Friese, 1924)
- Meroglossa sulcifrons (Smith, 1853)
- Meroglossa torrida (Smith, 1879)
