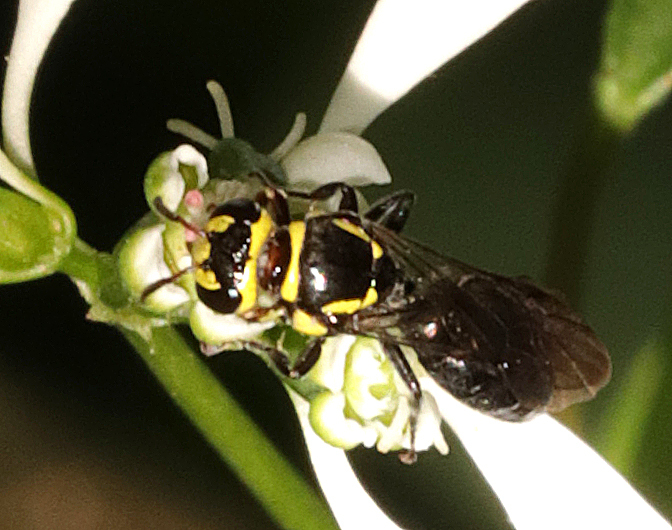
- Hemirhiza melliceps

Scientific classification
- Kingdom: Animalia
- Phylum: Arthropoda
- Clade: Pancrustacea
- Class: Insecta
- Order: Hymenoptera
- Superfamily: Apoidea
- Clade: Anthophila
- Family: Colletidae
- Subfamily: Hylaeinae
- Genus: Hemirhiza; Michener, 1965

= Hemirhiza =

Genus of bees

Hemirhiza is a monotypic genus of bees in the family Colletidae and the subfamily Hylaeinae. It is endemic to Australia. It was described in 1965 by American entomologist Charles Duncan Michener.

== Species ==
As of 2026 the genus contained a single valid species:

- Hemirhiza melliceps (Cockerell, 1918)

The species, also known as the honey-headed masked bee, originally described by British American entomologist Theodore Dru Alison Cockerell in 1918, occurs in south-eastern Australia in New South Wales and Queensland. Type localities include Brisbane and Mount Tamborine. The adults are flying mellivores. Flowering plants visited by the bees include Erigeron, Prostanthera, Rubus and Solanum species.
