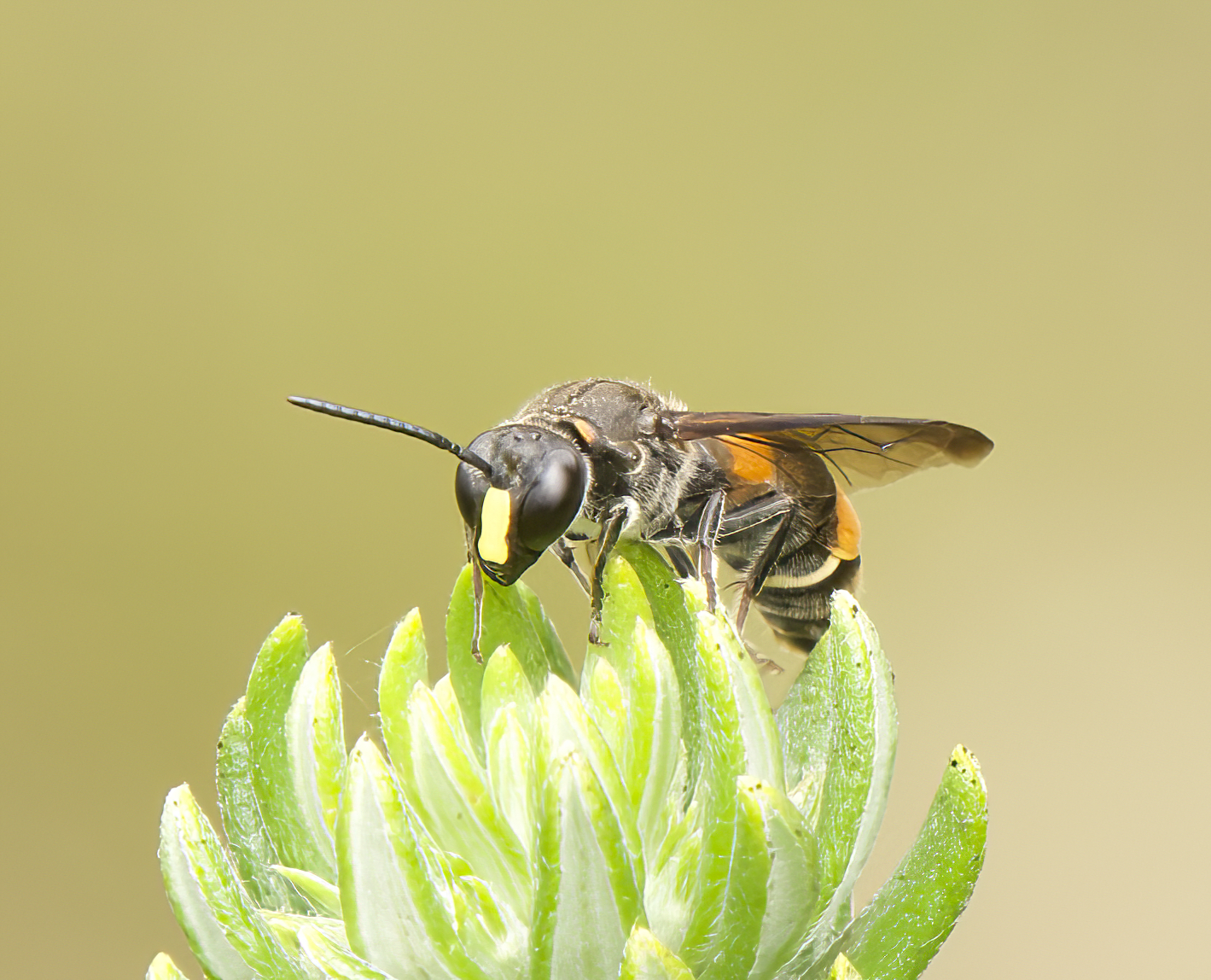
- Hyleoides concinna

Scientific classification
- Kingdom: Animalia
- Phylum: Arthropoda
- Clade: Pancrustacea
- Class: Insecta
- Order: Hymenoptera
- Infraorder: Aculeata
- Superfamily: Apoidea
- Clade: Anthophila
- Family: Colletidae
- Genus: Hyleoides; Smith, 1853

= Hyleoides =

Genus of bees

Hyleoides is a genus of bees in the family Colletidae and the subfamily Hylaeinae. It is naturally endemic to Australia, although one species (H. concinna) has been accidentally introduced to New Zealand. It was described in 1853 by English entomologist Frederick Smith.

== Species ==
As of 2026 the genus contained eight valid species:

- Hyleoides abnormis Houston, 1975
- Hyleoides bivulnerata Cockerell, 1921
- Hyleoides concinna (Fabricius, 1775)
- Hyleoides concinnula Cockerell, 1909
- Hyleoides planifrons Houston, 1975
- Hyleoides striatula Cockerell, 1921
- Hyleoides waterhousei Cockerell, 1913
- Hyleoides zonalis Smith, 1853
