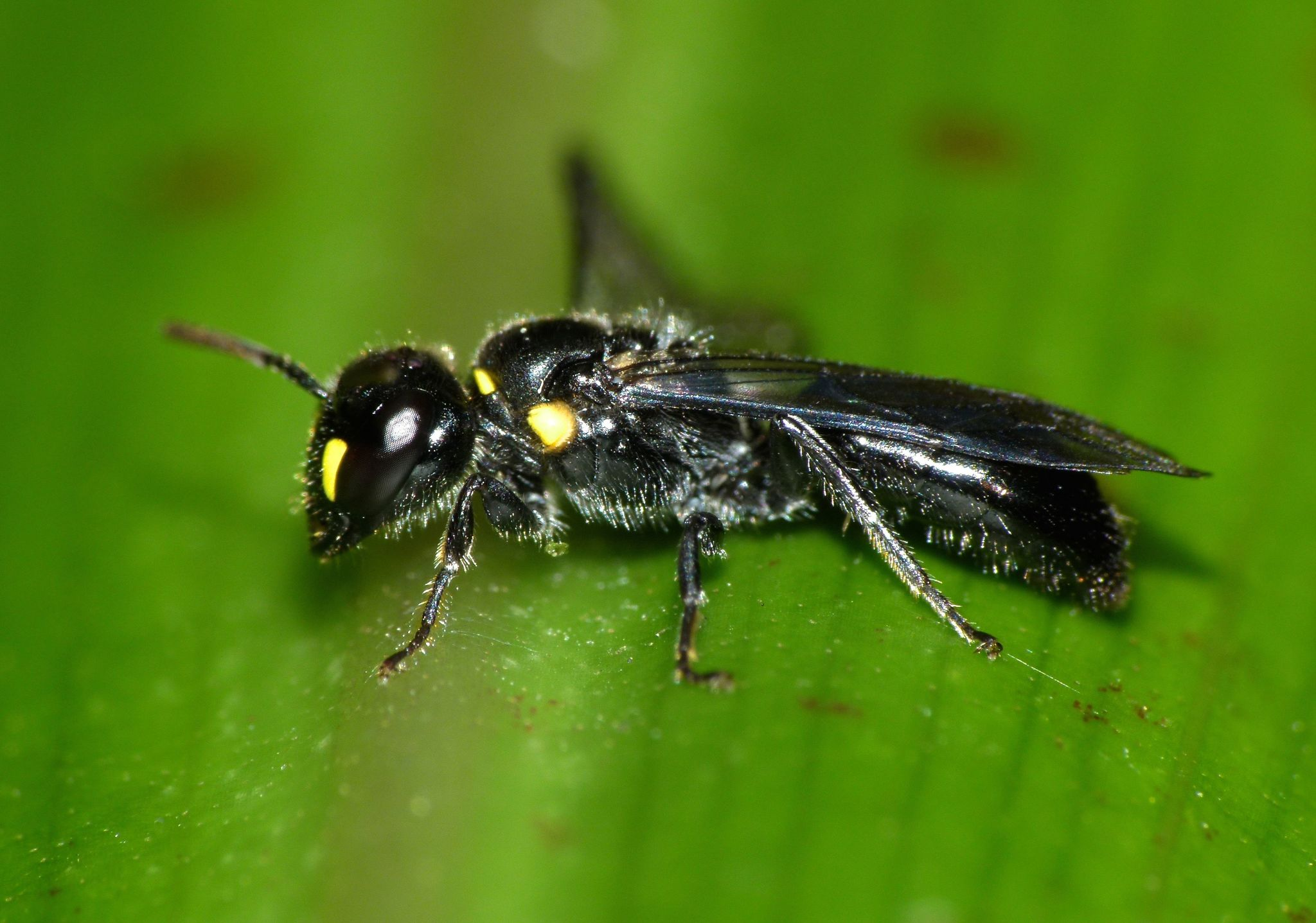
- Hylaeus agilis

Scientific classification
- Kingdom: Animalia
- Phylum: Arthropoda
- Clade: Pancrustacea
- Class: Insecta
- Order: Hymenoptera
- Family: Colletidae
- Subfamily: Hylaeinae

= Hylaeinae =

Subfamily of bees

Hylaeinae is a subfamily of plasterer bees found worldwide, with the greatest subgeneric and species-level diversity in Australia. Like bees in the Euryglossinae subfamily, Hylaeinae bees are relatively small and carry pollen internally in the crop.

== Taxonomy ==
Hylaeinae contains the following genera:

- Amphylaeus Michener, 1965
- Hemirhiza Michener, 1965
- Hylaeus Fabricius, 1793
- Hyleoides Smith, 1853
- Meroglossa Smith, 1853
- Palaeorhiza Perkins, 1908
- Xenorhiza Michener, 1965
