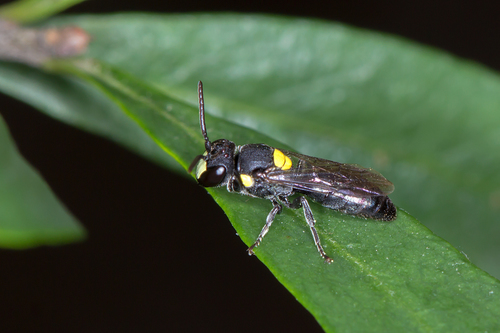
- Round-headed masked bee in Seymour, Victoria

Scientific classification
- Kingdom: Animalia
- Phylum: Arthropoda
- Clade: Pancrustacea
- Class: Insecta
- Order: Hymenoptera
- Family: Colletidae
- Genus: Hylaeus
- Species: H. rotundiceps

Binomial name
- Hylaeus rotundiceps (Smith, 1879)

Synonyms
- Prosopis rotundiceps Smith, 1879; Prosopis aposuara Cockerell, 1910

= Hylaeus rotundiceps =

Species of bee

Hylaeus rotundiceps, or Hylaeus (Euprosopoides) rotundiceps, also known as the round-headed masked bee, is a species of bee in the family Colletidae and subfamily Hylaeinae. It is endemic to Australia. It was described by English entomologist Frederick Smith in 1879.

== Distribution and habitat ==
The species occurs in eastern Australia. Type localities include Melbourne and Mackay, Queensland.

== Behaviour ==
The adults are flying mellivores. Flowering plants visited by the bees include Angophora, Banksia, Callistemon, Eucalyptus, Eugenia, Jacksonia, Leptospermum, Pultenaea, Tristaniopsis and Xanthorrhoea species.

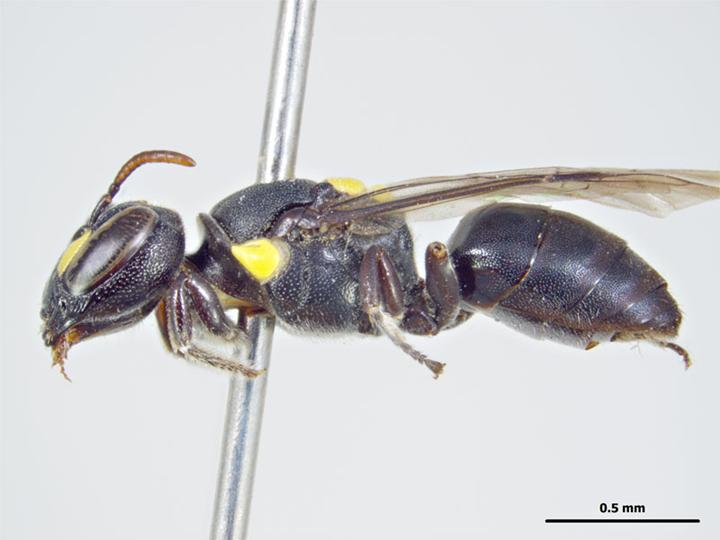
Female

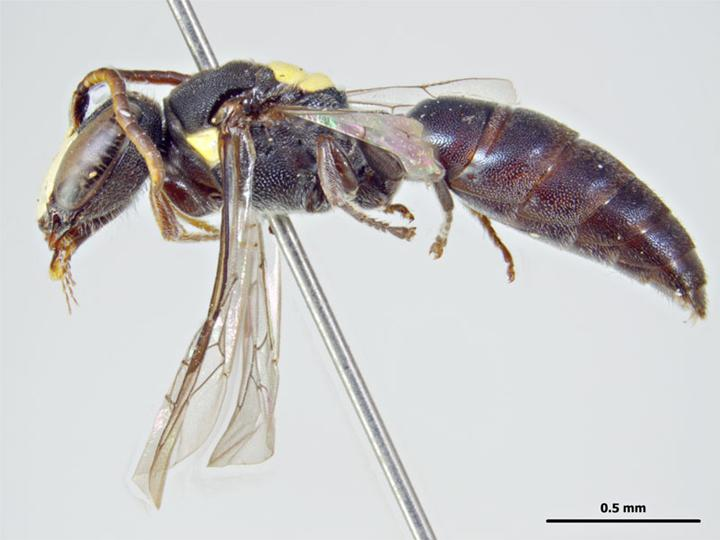
Male
