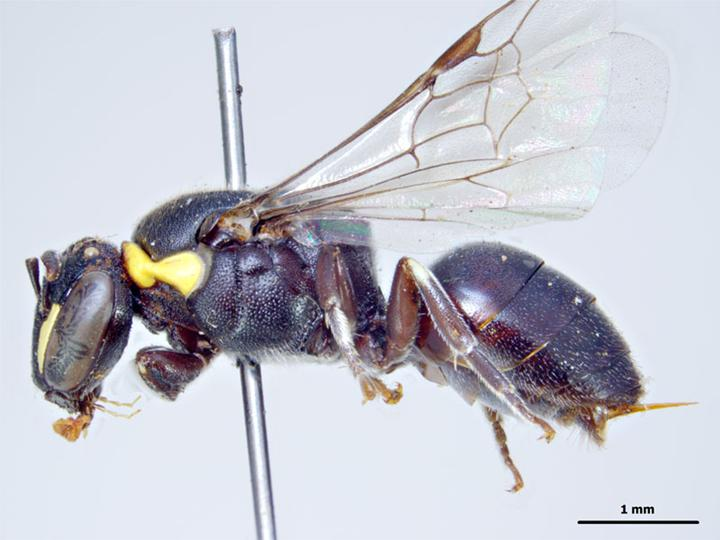
- Female

Scientific classification
- Kingdom: Animalia
- Phylum: Arthropoda
- Clade: Pancrustacea
- Class: Insecta
- Order: Hymenoptera
- Family: Colletidae
- Genus: Hylaeus
- Species: H. amiculiformis

Binomial name
- Hylaeus amiculiformis (Cockerell, 1909)

Synonyms
- Prosopis amiculiformis Cockerell, 1909; Gnathoprosopis hackeri Cockerell, 1912; Gnathoprosopis simpliciventris Cockerell, 1922

= Hylaeus amiculiformis =

Species of bee

Hylaeus amiculiformis, or Hylaeus (Gnathoprosopis) amiculiformis, is a species of bee in the family Colletidae and subfamily Hylaeinae. It is endemic to Australia. It was described by British-American entomologist Theodore Dru Alison Cockerell in 1909.

== Description ==
Female body length is about 7 mm. Integumental colouration is mainly black with yellow markings.

== Distribution and habitat ==
The species occurs in eastern Australia. Type localities include Brisbane and Mackay, Queensland.

== Behaviour ==
The adults are flying mellivores. Flowering plants visited by the bees include Callistemon, Eucalyptus, Eugenia, Leptospermum, Melaleuca, Tristaniopsis and Xanthorrhoea species.

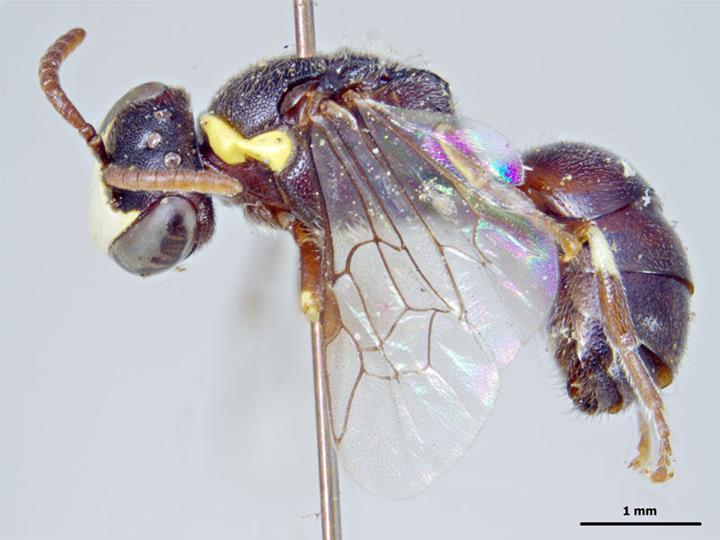
Male
