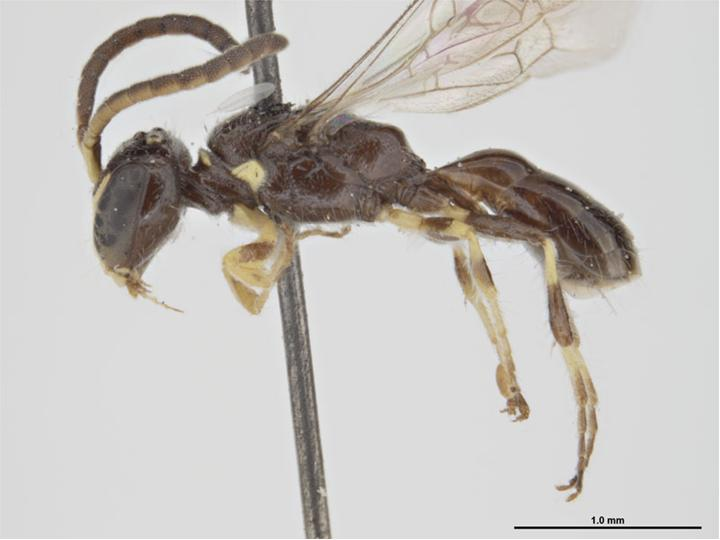
- Male

Scientific classification
- Kingdom: Animalia
- Phylum: Arthropoda
- Clade: Pancrustacea
- Class: Insecta
- Order: Hymenoptera
- Family: Colletidae
- Genus: Hylaeus
- Species: H. exleyae

Binomial name
- Hylaeus exleyae (Houston, 1975)

Synonyms
- Heterapoides exleyae Houston, 1975

= Hylaeus exleyae =

Species of bee

Hylaeus exleyae, or Hylaeus (Heterapoides) exleyae, is a species of bee in the family Colletidae and subfamily Hylaeinae. It is endemic to Australia. It was described by Australian entomologist Terry Houston in 1975.

== Distribution and habitat ==
The species occurs in eastern Australia. The type locality is Noosa, in south-east Queensland.

== Behaviour ==
The adults are flying mellivores. Flowering plants visited by the bees include Eugenia and Tristaniopsis species.
