= Melaleuca buseana =

Conservation status
- Vulnerable (IUCN 3.1)

Scientific classification
- Kingdom: Plantae
- Clade: Tracheophytes
- Clade: Angiosperms
- Clade: Eudicots
- Clade: Rosids
- Order: Myrtales
- Family: Myrtaceae
- Genus: Melaleuca
- Species: M. buseana

Binomial name
- Melaleuca buseana (Guillaumin) Craven & J.W.Dawson

Synonyms
- Callistemon buseanus Guillaumin

Species of shrub

Melaleuca buseana is a shrub or small tree in the myrtle family, Myrtaceae, and is endemic to the south of Grande Terre, the main island of New Caledonia. It is one of only a few members of its genus to occur outside Australia and was formerly known as Callistemon buseanus.

== Description ==
Melaleuca brevisepala is a shrub or small tree growing to a height of 7 m (20 ft). It has a highly branched crown and the branchlets are covered with fine white hairs but become glabrous with age. The leaves have a short stalk and an elliptical shape with a blunt end, 15–33 mm (0.6–1 in) long and 4–6 mm (0.16–0.24 in) wide and 3 to 5 parallel veins.

Yellow or greenish-yellow flowers occur on the ends of the branches and in some leaf axils near the end but the branch usually continues to grow after flowering. The stamens are arranged in five bundles around the flower with 3 or 4 stamens per bundle. The cup-shaped base of the flower is hairy, 4–4.2 mm (0.16–0.17 in) long and the fruit which develops from it is 4.5–6 mm (0.18–0.24 in) long. Flowers and fruit are seen from December to May or June.

== Taxonomy and naming ==
Melaleuca buseana was first formally described in 1939 by André Guillaumin in Bulletin du Muséum d'Histoire Naturelle as Callistemon buseanus. It was transferred to Melaleuca buseana in 1998 by Lyndley Craven and John Dawson in the journal Adansonia. The specific epithet (buseana) refers to the locality Pic Buse in New Caledonia.

== Distribution and habitat ==
Melaleuca buseana is sparsely distributed in the southern part of Grande Terre. It is found in the undergrowth of dense, humid forest and maquis in loose, eroded gravel and soil on ultramafic rock.
