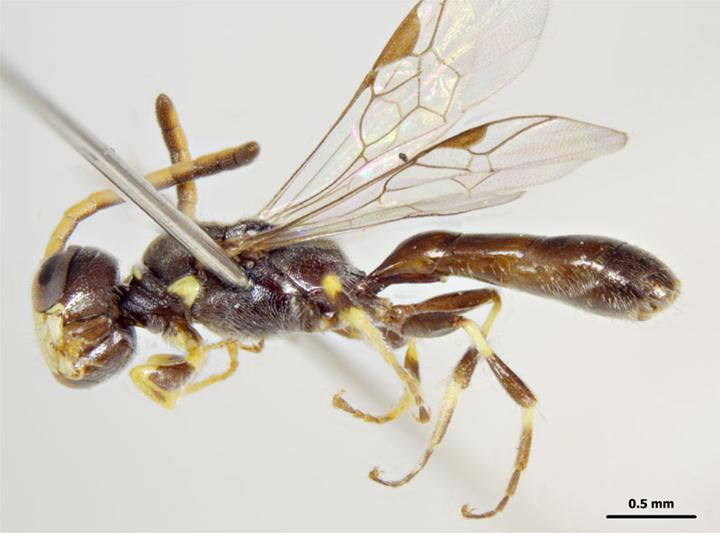
- Male

Scientific classification
- Kingdom: Animalia
- Phylum: Arthropoda
- Clade: Pancrustacea
- Class: Insecta
- Order: Hymenoptera
- Family: Colletidae
- Genus: Hylaeus
- Species: H. bacillarius

Binomial name
- Hylaeus bacillarius (Cockerell, 1914)

Synonyms
- Prosopis bacillaria Cockerell, 1914

= Hylaeus bacillarius =

Species of bee

Hylaeus bacillarius, or Hylaeus (Heterapoides) bacillarius, is a species of bee in the family Colletidae and subfamily Hylaeinae. It is endemic to Australia. It was described by British-American entomologist Theodore Dru Alison Cockerell in 1914.

== Description ==
Male body length is about 4 mm. Integumental colouration is mainly black, with yellow markings.

== Distribution and habitat ==
The species occurs in eastern Australia. The type locality is Brisbane.

== Behaviour ==
The adults are flying mellivores. Flowering plants visited by the bees include Daviesia, Jacksonia, Leptospermum, Melaleuca and Tristaniopsis species.
