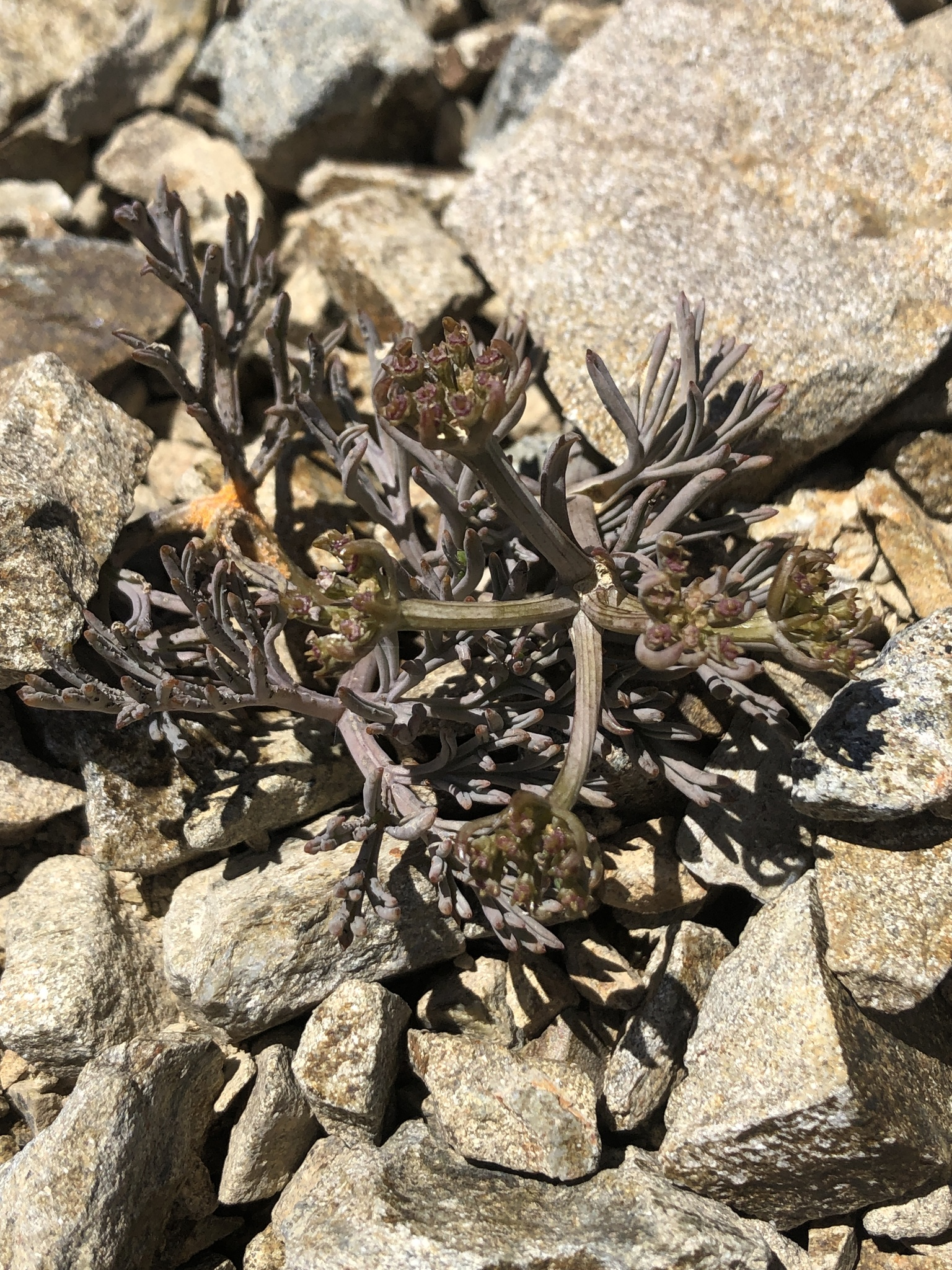
- Lignocarpa diversifolia in Nelson Lakes National Park

Conservation status
- Naturally Uncommon (NZ TCS)

Scientific classification
- Kingdom: Plantae
- Clade: Tracheophytes
- Clade: Angiosperms
- Clade: Eudicots
- Clade: Asterids
- Order: Apiales
- Family: Apiaceae
- Genus: Lignocarpa
- Species: L. diversifolia

Binomial name
- Lignocarpa diversifolia (Cheeseman) J.W.Dawson

= Lignocarpa diversifolia =

Species of plant

Lignocarpa diversifolia is a species of Apiaceae native to alpine New Zealand.

== Description ==
A small grey plant with divaricating branches.

The secondary bracts are simple, unlike in Lignocarpa carnosula, which is the Lignocarpa species in the southern Southern Alps.

== Range ==
Its current known range is in the South Island of New Zealand, in the more northerly range such as Nelson Lakes National Park and more northerly.

== Habitat ==
Scree slopes with fine sediment.

== Ecology ==
This plant is visited by the rust fungus Puccinia whakatipu.
