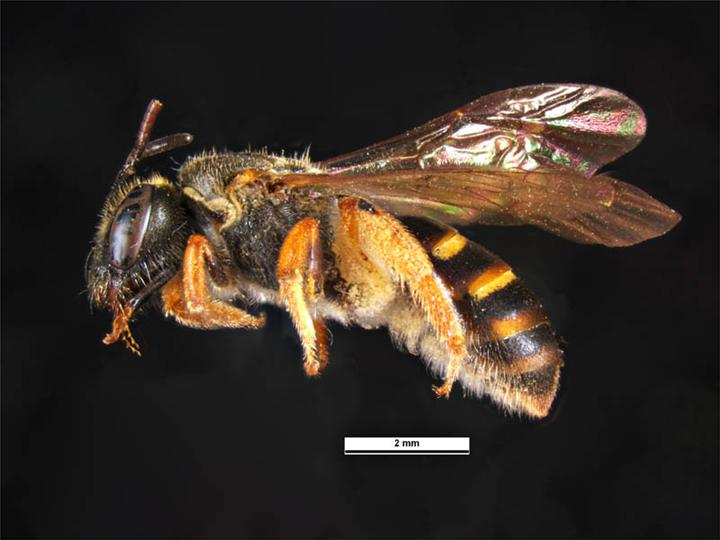
- Female

Scientific classification
- Kingdom: Animalia
- Phylum: Arthropoda
- Clade: Pancrustacea
- Class: Insecta
- Order: Hymenoptera
- Family: Halictidae
- Genus: Lasioglossum
- Species: L. bicingulatum

Binomial name
- Lasioglossum bicingulatum Smith, 1853

Synonyms
- Halictus bicingulatus Smith, 1853; Halictus leai Cockerell, 1910; Halictus haematopus Cockerell, 1914; Halictus sanguinipes Cockerell, 1914; Halictus festivus Rayment, 1935

= Lasioglossum bicingulatum =

Species of bee

Lasioglossum bicingulatum, or Lasioglossum (Chilalictus) bicingulatum, is a species of bee in the family Halictidae and subfamily Halictinae. It is endemic to Australia. It was described by English entomologist Frederick Smith in 1853.

== Distribution and habitat ==
The species occurs in eastern Australia. Type localities include Melbourne, West Warburton and Windsor, Victoria, as well as Launceston, Tasmania.

== Behaviour ==
The adults are flying mellivores. They nest gregariously in soil, with some nests holding more than one female. Flowering plants visited by the bees include Acacia, Angophora, Baeckea, Bursaria, Callistemon, Eucalyptus, Eugenia, Jacksonia, Kunzea, Leptospermum, Ligustrum, Melaleuca, Pultenaea, Schinus and Tristaniopsis species.

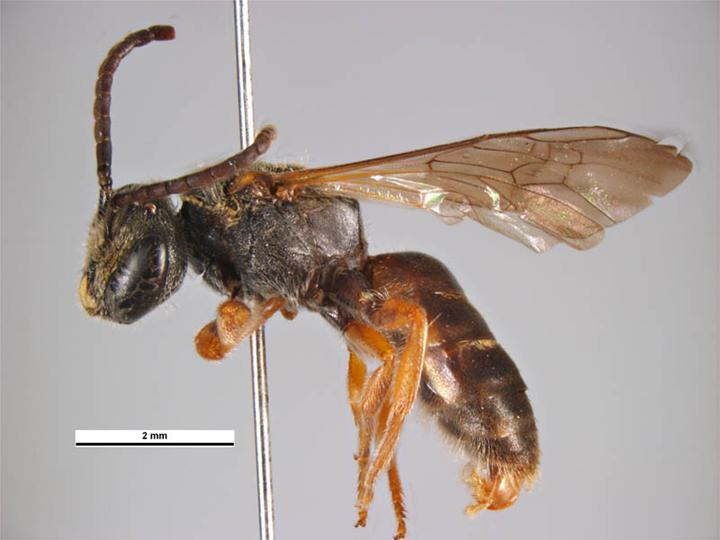
Male
