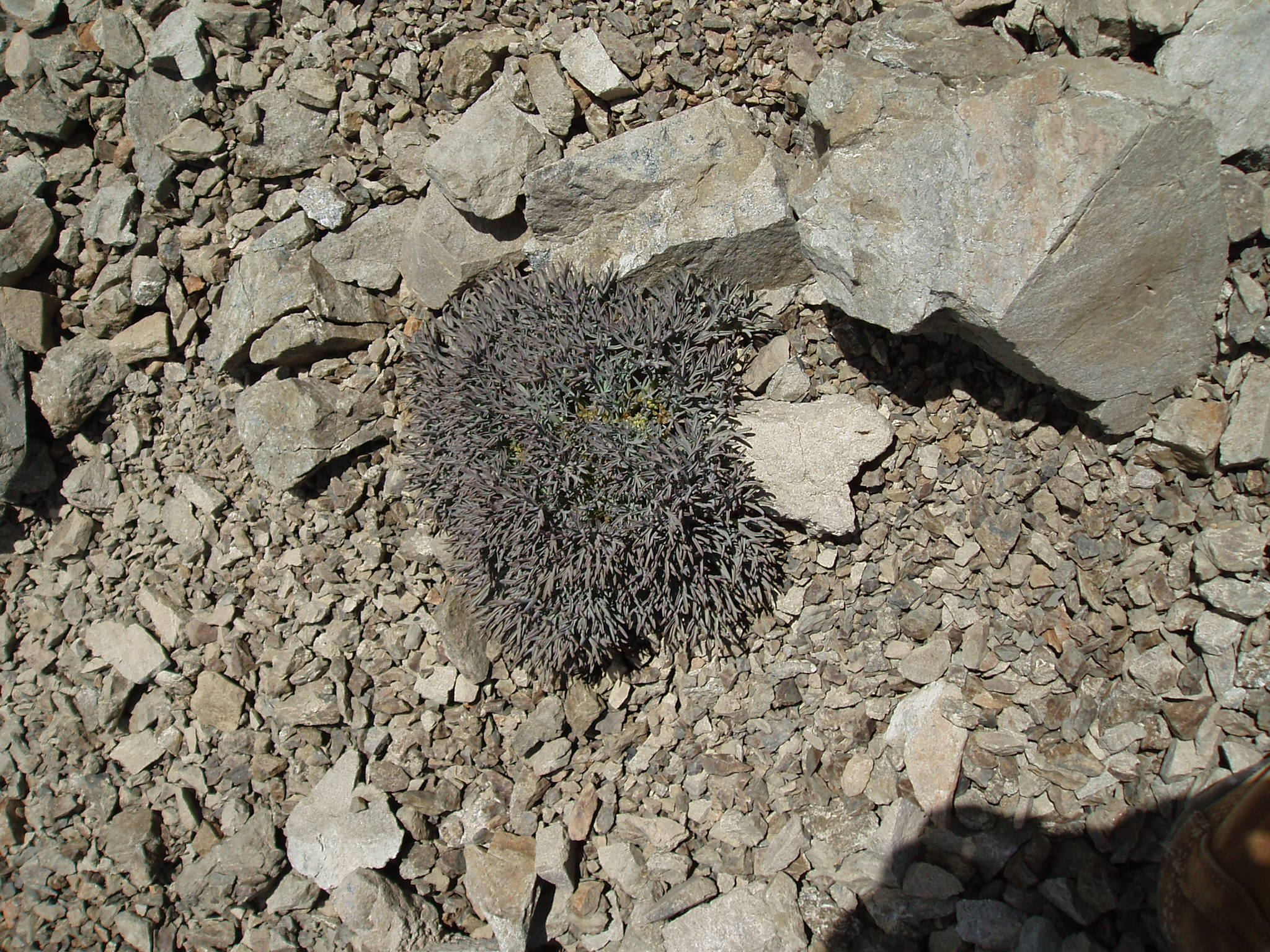
- Lignocarpa carnosula

Scientific classification
- Kingdom: Plantae
- Clade: Tracheophytes
- Clade: Angiosperms
- Clade: Eudicots
- Clade: Asterids
- Order: Apiales
- Family: Apiaceae
- Subfamily: Apioideae
- Tribe: Aciphylleae
- Genus: Lignocarpa; J.W.Dawson

= Lignocarpa =

Genus of plants

Lignocarpa is a genus of flowering plants belonging to the family Apiaceae.

Its native range is New Zealand.

Species:

- Lignocarpa carnosula (Hook.f.) J.W.Dawson
- Lignocarpa diversifolia (Cheeseman) J.W.Dawson
