= Tristaniopsis reticulata =

Conservation status
- Vulnerable (IUCN 3.1)

Scientific classification
- Kingdom: Plantae
- Clade: Tracheophytes
- Clade: Angiosperms
- Clade: Eudicots
- Clade: Rosids
- Order: Myrtales
- Family: Myrtaceae
- Genus: Tristaniopsis
- Species: T. reticulata

Binomial name
- Tristaniopsis reticulata J.W.Dawson

Species of flowering plant

Tristaniopsis reticulata is a species of flowering plant in the family Myrtaceae. It is a tree endemic to southeastern New Caledonia.
