= Tristaniopsis yateensis =

Conservation status
- Vulnerable (IUCN 3.1)

Scientific classification
- Kingdom: Plantae
- Clade: Tracheophytes
- Clade: Angiosperms
- Clade: Eudicots
- Clade: Rosids
- Order: Myrtales
- Family: Myrtaceae
- Genus: Tristaniopsis
- Species: T. yateensis

Binomial name
- Tristaniopsis yateensis J.W.Dawson

Species of flowering plant

Tristaniopsis yateensis is a species of plant in the family Myrtaceae. It is endemic to New Caledonia. It is threatened by habitat loss.
