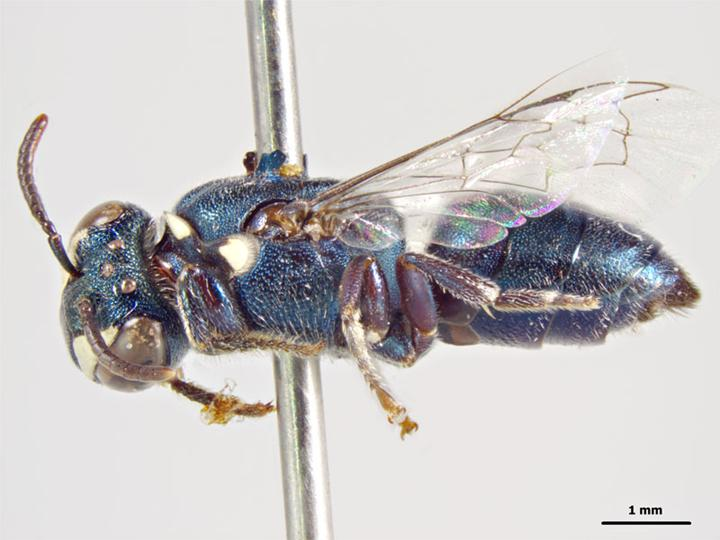
- Female

Scientific classification
- Kingdom: Animalia
- Phylum: Arthropoda
- Clade: Pancrustacea
- Class: Insecta
- Order: Hymenoptera
- Family: Colletidae
- Genus: Hylaeus
- Species: H. disjunctus

Binomial name
- Hylaeus disjunctus (Cockerell, 1905)

Synonyms
- Prosopis disjuncta Cockerell, 1905; Prosopis basalis Friese, 1924

= Hylaeus disjunctus =

Species of bee

Hylaeus disjunctus, or Hylaeus (Euprosopis) disjunctus, is a species of bee in the family Colletidae and subfamily Hylaeinae. It is endemic to Australia. It was described by British-American entomologist Theodore Dru Alison Cockerell in 1905.

== Distribution and habitat ==
The species occurs in northern and north-eastern Australia. The type locality is Mackay, Queensland.

== Behaviour ==
The adults are flying mellivores. Flowering plants visited by the bees include Angophora, Callistemon, Dendrobium, Eucalyptus, Eugenia, Leptospermum, Melaleuca, Tristaniopsis and Xanthorrhoea species.

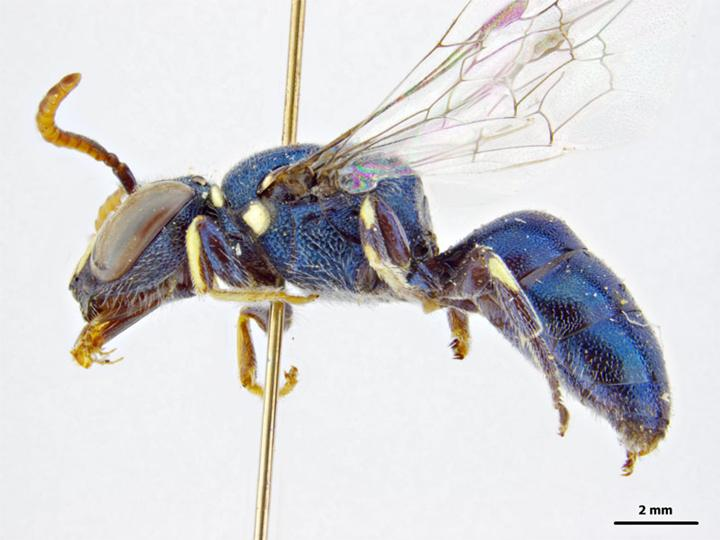
Male
