= Tristaniopsis minutiflora =

Conservation status
- Critically Endangered (IUCN 3.1)

Scientific classification
- Kingdom: Plantae
- Clade: Tracheophytes
- Clade: Angiosperms
- Clade: Eudicots
- Clade: Rosids
- Order: Myrtales
- Family: Myrtaceae
- Genus: Tristaniopsis
- Species: T. minutiflora

Binomial name
- Tristaniopsis minutiflora J.W.Dawson

Species of flowering plant

Tristaniopsis minutiflora is a species of plant in the family Myrtaceae. It is endemic to New Caledonia.
