= Hylaeus nubilosus =

- Female

Scientific classification
- Kingdom: Animalia
- Phylum: Arthropoda
- Clade: Pancrustacea
- Class: Insecta
- Order: Hymenoptera
- Family: Colletidae
- Genus: Hylaeus
- Species: H. nubilosus

Binomial name
- Hylaeus nubilosus (Smith, 1853)

Synonyms
- Prosopis nubilosa Smith, 1853; Prosopis aureomaculata Cockerell, 1909; Prosopis nubilosa subnubilosa Cockerell, 1910; Hylaeus spryi Cockerell, 1926; Hylaeus simillimus tasmani Cockerell, 1929

Species of bee

Hylaeus nubilosus, or Hylaeus (Hylaeorhiza) nubilosus, is a species of bee in the family Colletidae and subfamily Hylaeinae. It is also known as the cloudy masked bee. It is native to Australia and New Guinea. It was described by English entomologist Frederick Smith in 1853.

== Description ==
Hylaeus nubilosus is a medium-sized (6–9 mm) masked bee with a conspicuous yellow thoracic badge in the middle of the scutellum and metanotum.

== Distribution and habitat ==
The species occurs across much of southern and eastern Australia. Type localities include Melbourne and Belgrave, Victoria; Mackay and Kuranda, Queensland; and Tasmania. It has also been recorded from Lae in Papua New Guinea.

== Behaviour ==
The adults are solitary flying mellivores, with sedentary larvae. The bees prefer to nest in the abandoned nests of mud-dauber wasps such as Sphecidae and potter wasps Eumeninae. Flowering plants visited by the bees include Acacia, Angophora, Boronia, Bursaria, Callistemon, Eucalyptus, Eugenia, Jacksonia, Leptospermum, Melaleuca, Teucrium, Tristaniopsis and Xanthorrhoea species.

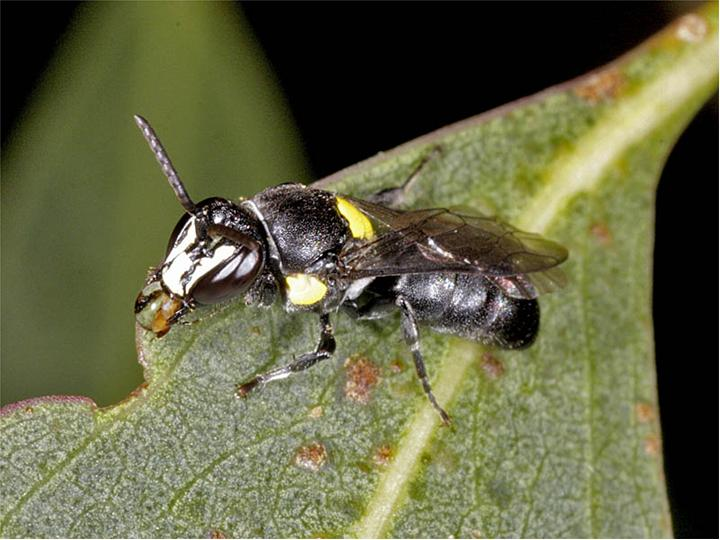
Male
