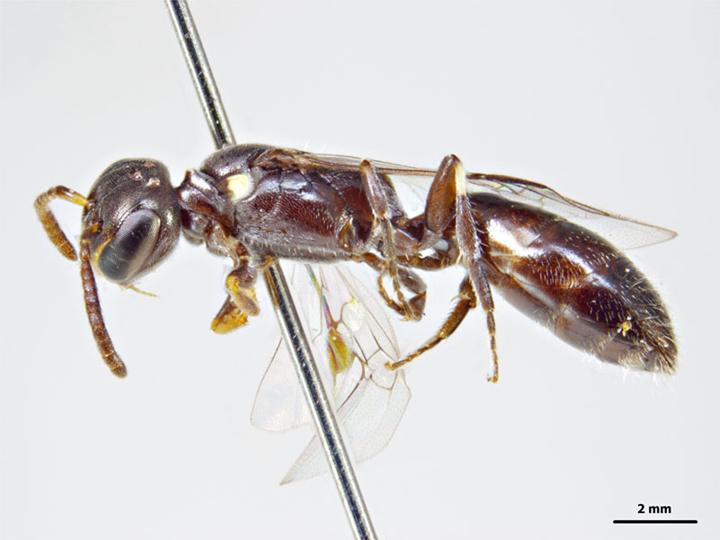
- Female

Scientific classification
- Kingdom: Animalia
- Phylum: Arthropoda
- Clade: Pancrustacea
- Class: Insecta
- Order: Hymenoptera
- Family: Colletidae
- Genus: Hylaeus
- Species: H. extensus

Binomial name
- Hylaeus extensus (Cockerell, 1916)

Synonyms
- Prosopis extensa Cockerell, 1916

= Hylaeus extensus =

Species of bee

Hylaeus extensus, or Hylaeus (Heterapoides) extensus, is a species of bee in the family Colletidae and subfamily Hylaeinae. It is endemic to Australia. It was described by British-American entomologist Theodore Dru Alison Cockerell in 1916.

== Description ==
Female body length is about 4 mm. Integumental colouration is mainly black, with yellow to reddish markings.

== Distribution and habitat ==
The species occurs in eastern Australia. The type locality is Mount Yule, near Healesville in Victoria.

== Behaviour ==
The adults are flying mellivores. Flowering plants visited by the bees include Callistemon, Daviesia, Eucalyptus, Jacksonia, Leptospermum, Melaleuca, Tristaniopsis and Xanthorrhoea species.

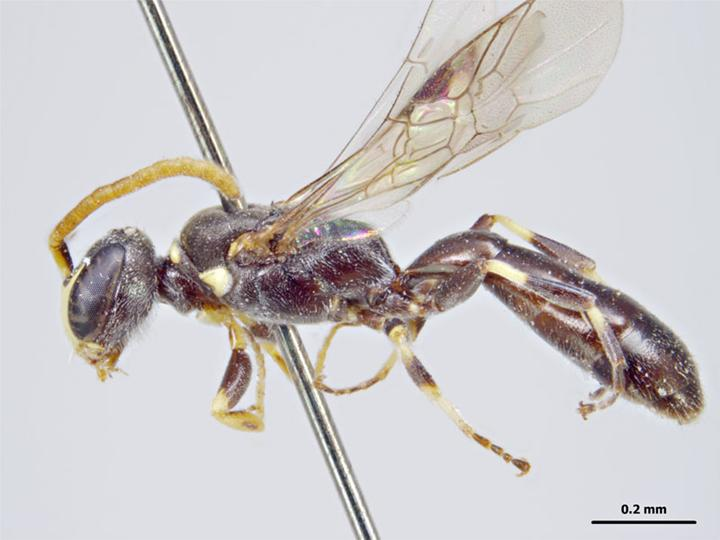
Male
