= Tristaniopsis polyandra =

Conservation status
- Critically Endangered (IUCN 3.1)

Scientific classification
- Kingdom: Plantae
- Clade: Tracheophytes
- Clade: Angiosperms
- Clade: Eudicots
- Clade: Rosids
- Order: Myrtales
- Family: Myrtaceae
- Genus: Tristaniopsis
- Species: T. polyandra

Binomial name
- Tristaniopsis polyandra (Guillaumin) Peter G.Wilson & J.T.Waterh.

Synonyms
- Tristania polyandra Guillaumin; Tristania vieillardii var. grandiflora Bonati & Petitm.

Species of flowering plant

Tristaniopsis polyandra is a species of plant in the family Myrtaceae. It is a shrub or tree endemic to southeastern New Caledonia. It is known only from the Dumbéa basin in the south of Grande Terre, where it grows on slopes in dry shrubland on ultramafic soils from 50 to 200 metres elevation.
