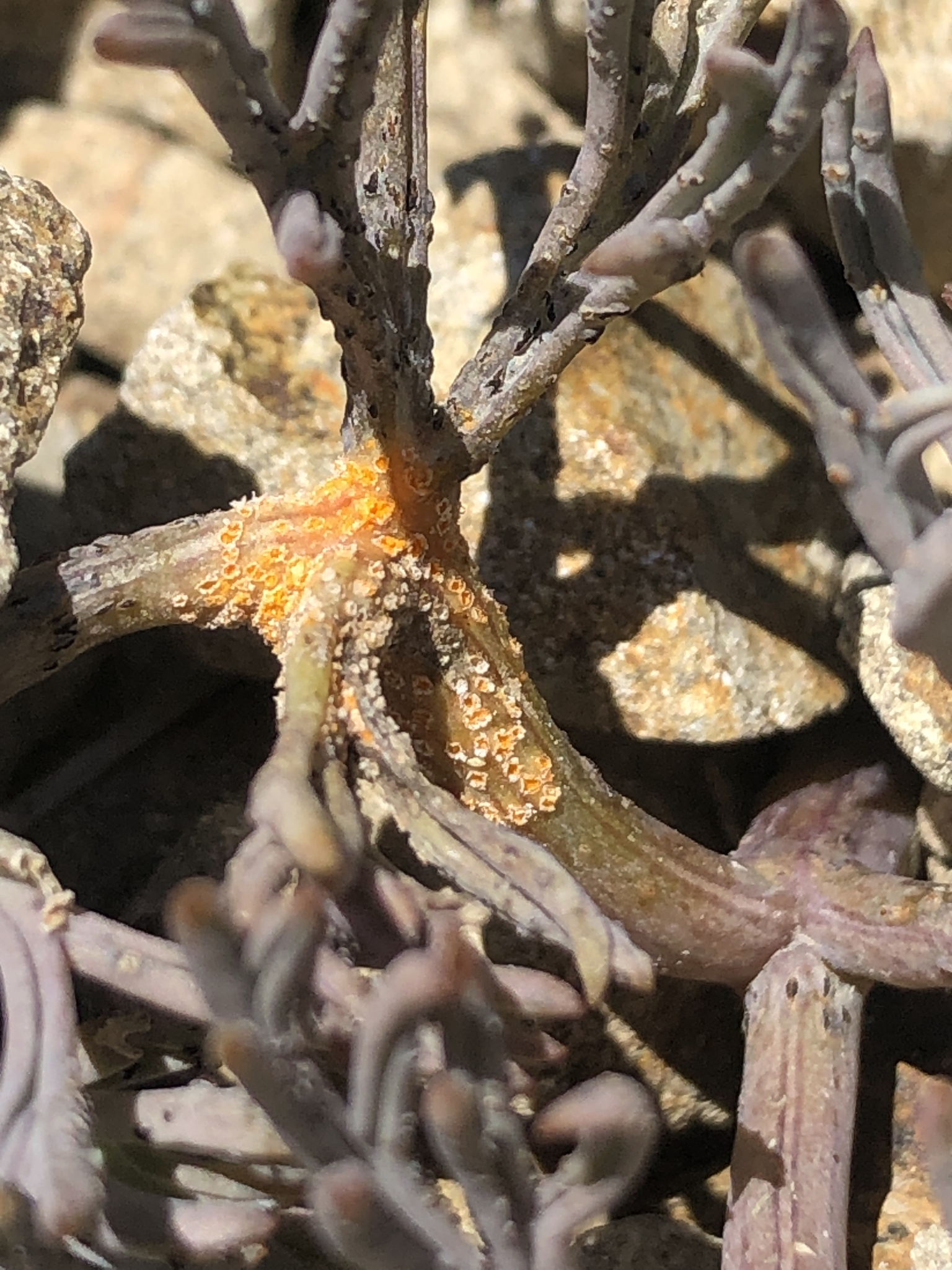

Scientific classification
- Domain: Eukaryota
- Kingdom: Fungi
- Division: Basidiomycota
- Class: Pucciniomycetes
- Order: Pucciniales
- Family: Pucciniaceae
- Genus: Puccinia
- Species: P. whakatipu

Binomial name
- Puccinia whakatipu G.Cunn. (1924)

= Puccinia whakatipu =

Species of fungus

Puccinia whakatipu is a species of rust fungus on Leptocarpus in New Zealand. It was formally described as a new species in 1924 by the mycologist Gordon Herriot Cunningham.

== Description ==
A small orange rust that exists on the stems of Lignocarpa diversifolia.

== Range ==
South Island of New Zealand.

== Habitat ==
Its known habitat is in alpine environments.
