= Tristaniopsis pontianensis =

Conservation status
- Endangered (IUCN 2.3)

Scientific classification
- Kingdom: Plantae
- Clade: Tracheophytes
- Clade: Angiosperms
- Clade: Eudicots
- Clade: Rosids
- Order: Myrtales
- Family: Myrtaceae
- Genus: Tristaniopsis
- Species: T. pontianensis

Binomial name
- Tristaniopsis pontianensis (M.R.Hend.) Peter G.Wilson & J.T.Waterh.

Synonyms
- Tristania pontianensis M.R.Hend.

Species of flowering plant

Tristaniopsis pontianensis is a species of plant in the family Myrtaceae. It is found in Peninsular Malaysia and Singapore. It is threatened by habitat loss.
