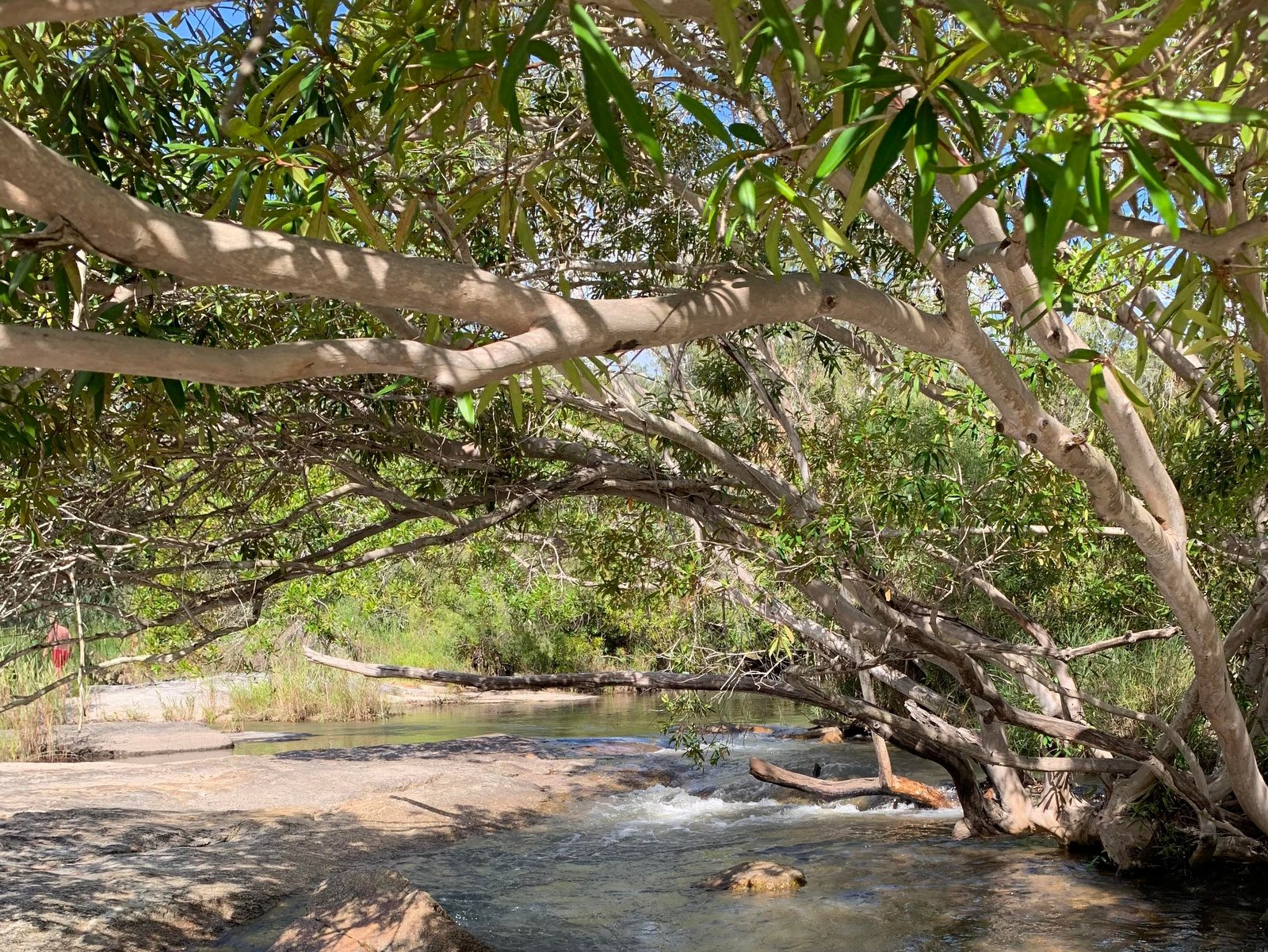

Conservation status
- Least Concern (NCA)

Scientific classification
- Kingdom: Plantae
- Clade: Tracheophytes
- Clade: Angiosperms
- Clade: Eudicots
- Clade: Rosids
- Order: Myrtales
- Family: Myrtaceae
- Genus: Tristaniopsis
- Species: T. exiliflora

Binomial name
- Tristaniopsis exiliflora (F.Muell.) Peter G.Wilson & J.T.Waterh.

= Tristaniopsis exiliflora =

Kanuka box

Species of flowering plant

Tristaniopsis exiliflora, commonly known as kanuka box, water gum or river gum, is a species of plant in the family Myrtaceae. It is found beside streams in Queensland, Australia, ranging from near the coast to 1,000 metres above sea level.
