= Tristaniopsis littoralis =

Conservation status
- Endangered (IUCN 3.1)

Scientific classification
- Kingdom: Plantae
- Clade: Tracheophytes
- Clade: Angiosperms
- Clade: Eudicots
- Clade: Rosids
- Order: Myrtales
- Family: Myrtaceae
- Genus: Tristaniopsis
- Species: T. littoralis

Binomial name
- Tristaniopsis littoralis (Merr.) Peter G.Wilson & J.T.Waterh.

Synonyms
- Tristania littoralis Merr.

Species of flowering plant

Tristaniopsis littoralis is a species of plant in the family Myrtaceae. It is endemic to the Philippines. It is threatened by habitat loss.
