= Tristaniopsis razakiana =

Conservation status
- Conservation Dependent (IUCN 2.3)

Scientific classification
- Kingdom: Plantae
- Clade: Tracheophytes
- Clade: Angiosperms
- Clade: Eudicots
- Clade: Rosids
- Order: Myrtales
- Family: Myrtaceae
- Genus: Tristaniopsis
- Species: T. razakiana

Binomial name
- Tristaniopsis razakiana (Kochummen) Peter G.Wilson & J.T.Waterh.

Synonyms
- Tristania razakiana Kochummen

Species of flowering plant

Tristaniopsis razakiana is a species of plant in the family Myrtaceae, formerly known as Tristania razakiana.

It is a terrestrial plant endemic to the montane forests of Peninsular Malaysia. There is a documented population on Fraser's Hill, but development there threatens the species with habitat loss.
