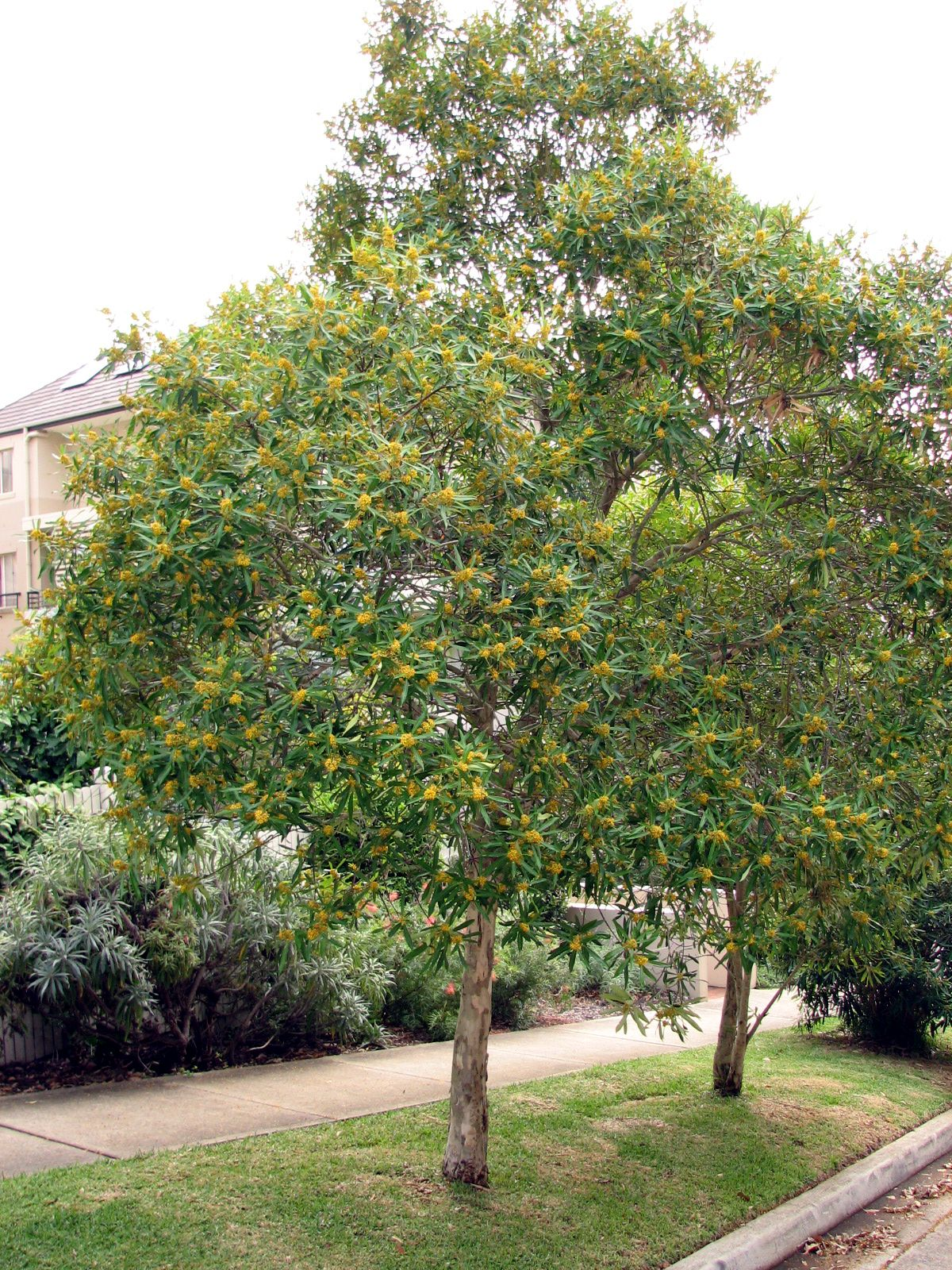
- Tristaniopsis laurina as a street tree in Sydney

Scientific classification
- Kingdom: Plantae
- Clade: Tracheophytes
- Clade: Angiosperms
- Clade: Eudicots
- Clade: Rosids
- Order: Myrtales
- Family: Myrtaceae
- Subfamily: Myrtoideae
- Tribe: Kanieae
- Genus: Tristaniopsis; Brongn. & Gris (1863)

Species
- 43; see text

Synonyms
- Thorelia (1877)

= Tristaniopsis =

Genus of flowering plants

Tristaniopsis is a genus of shrubs and trees in the myrtle family Myrtaceae described as a genus in 1863. They have a wide distribution in Southeast Asia, New Guinea, New Caledonia and Australia.

== Species ==
The following species are accepted by Plants of the World Online as at July 2024:

- Tristaniopsis anomala (Merr.) Peter G.Wilson & J.T.Waterh. – Borneo
- Tristaniopsis beccarii (Ridl.) Peter G.Wilson & J.T.Waterh. – Borneo
- Tristaniopsis bilocularis (Stapf) Peter G.Wilson & J.T.Waterh. – Borneo
- Tristaniopsis burmanica (Griff.) Peter G.Wilson & J.T.Waterh. – Thailand, Cambodia, and Myanmar
- Tristaniopsis callobuxus Brongn. & Gris – New Caledonia
- Tristaniopsis capitulata Brongn. & Gris – New Caledonia
- Tristaniopsis collina Peter G.Wilson & J.T.Waterh. – Queensland, New South Wales
- Tristaniopsis decorticata (Merr.) Peter G.Wilson & J.T.Waterh. – Philippines
- Tristaniopsis elliptica (Stapf) Peter G.Wilson & J.T.Waterh. – Borneo
- Tristaniopsis exiliflora (F.Muell.) Peter G.Wilson & J.T.Waterh. – Queensland
- Tristaniopsis ferruginea (C.T.White) Peter G.Wilson & J.T.Waterh. – New Guinea
- Tristaniopsis flexuosa Fernando & Peter G.Wilson – Philippines
- Tristaniopsis fruticosa (Ridl.) Peter G.Wilson & J.T.Waterh. – Peninsular Malaysia
- Tristaniopsis glauca Brongn. & Gris – New Caledonia
- Tristaniopsis guillainii Vieill. ex Brongn. & Gris – New Caledonia
- Tristaniopsis jaffrei J.W.Dawson – New Caledonia
- Tristaniopsis kinabaluensis P.S.Ashton – Borneo (Sabah)
- Tristaniopsis laurina (Sm.) Peter G.Wilson & J.T.Waterh. – Queensland, New South Wales, Victoria
- Tristaniopsis littoralis (Merr.) Peter G.Wilson & J.T.Waterh. – Philippines
- Tristaniopsis lucida J.W.Dawson – New Caledonia
- Tristaniopsis macphersonii J.W.Dawson – New Caledonia
- Tristaniopsis macrosperma (F.Muell.) Peter G.Wilson & J.T.Waterh. – New Guinea
- Tristaniopsis merguensis (Griff.) Peter G.Wilson & J.T.Waterh. – Cambodia, Myanmar, Peninsular Malaysia, Borneo, Java, Sumatra
- Tristaniopsis micrantha (Merr.) Peter G.Wilson & J.T.Waterh. – Philippines
- Tristaniopsis microcarpa P.S.Ashton – Borneo
- Tristaniopsis minutiflora J.W.Dawson – New Caledonia
- Tristaniopsis musa-amanii Berhaman & Peter G.Wilson – Borneo
- Tristaniopsis ninndoensis J.W.Dawson – New Caledonia
- Tristaniopsis oblongifolia (Merr.) Peter G.Wilson & J.T.Waterh. – Philippines
- Tristaniopsis obovata (Benn.) Peter G.Wilson & J.T.Waterh. – Peninsular Malaysia, Borneo, and Sumatra
- Tristaniopsis oreophila (Diels) Peter G.Wilson & J.T.Waterh. – New Guinea
- Tristaniopsis parvifolia A.J.Scott – western New Guinea
- Tristaniopsis pentandra (Merr.) Peter G.Wilson & J.T.Waterh. – Borneo
- Tristaniopsis planidisca Lannuzel – New Caledonia
- Tristaniopsis polyandra (Guillaumin) Peter G.Wilson & J.T.Waterh. – New Caledonia
- Tristaniopsis pontianensis (M.R.Hend.) Peter G.Wilson & J.T.Waterh. – Peninsular Malaysia
- Tristaniopsis razakiana (Kochummen) Peter G.Wilson & J.T.Waterh. – Peninsular Malaysia
- Tristaniopsis reticulata J.W.Dawson – New Caledonia
- Tristaniopsis rubiginosa Teo ex P.S.Ashton – Borneo
- Tristaniopsis sam-mannanii Berhaman & Peter G.Wilson – Borneo (Sabah)
- Tristaniopsis vieillardii Brongn. & Gris – New Caledonia
- Tristaniopsis whiteana (Griff.) Peter G.Wilson & J.T.Waterh. – Peninsular Malaysia, Borneo, and Sumatra
- Tristaniopsis yateensis J.W.Dawson – New Caledonia
