= List of Leioproctus species =

This is a list of species in the bee genus Leioproctus:

== Species ==
- Leioproctus abdominalis (Smith, 1879)
- Leioproctus abdominis Michener, 1965
- Leioproctus aberrans Leijs, 2018
- Leioproctus abnormis (Cockerell, 1916)
- Leioproctus acaciae (Rayment, 1939)
- Leioproctus advena (Smith, 1862)
- Leioproctus alatus Leijs, 2018
- Leioproctus albipilosus Leijs, 2018
- Leioproctus albiscopis Leijs, 2018
- Leioproctus albopilosus (Rayment, 1930)
- Leioproctus albovittatus (Cockerell, 1929)
- Leioproctus aliceafontanus Leijs, 2018
- Leioproctus alienus (Smith, 1853)
- Leioproctus alismatis (Ducke, 1908)
- Leioproctus alleynae (Rayment, 1935)
- Leioproctus alloeopus Maynard, 1991
- Leioproctus altispinosus Leijs, 2018
- Leioproctus amabilis (Smith, 1879)
- Leioproctus amblycladus Batley, 2025
- Leioproctus ammophilus Batley, 2025
- Leioproctus andinus (Herbst, 1923)
- Leioproctus antennatus (Smith, 1879)
- Leioproctus anthedonus Maynard, 2013
- Leioproctus anthracinus Michener, 1989
- Leioproctus apicalis (Cockerell, 1921)
- Leioproctus aquilus Maynard, 2013
- Leioproctus aratus Leijs, 2018
- Leioproctus arenarius Batley, 2025
- Leioproctus arenastrus Batley, 2025
- Leioproctus argentifrons (Smith, 1879)
- Leioproctus arnauellus Michener, 1989
- Leioproctus arnaui (Moure, 1949)
- Leioproctus asper Maynard, 1997
- Leioproctus asperifrons Batley, 2025
- Leioproctus atacama Toro, 1970
- Leioproctus atronitens (Cockerell, 1914)
- Leioproctus aureofimbriatus Batley & Houston, 2023
- Leioproctus aurescens (Cockerell, 1921)
- Leioproctus auricorneus Leijs, 2018
- Leioproctus aurifrons (Smith, 1853)
- Leioproctus australiensis (Dalla Torre, 1896)
- Leioproctus autumnalis Batley, 2025
- Leioproctus bacchalis (Cockerell, 1914)
- Leioproctus badius Maynard, 2013
- Leioproctus baeckeae (Rayment, 1948)
- Leioproctus barrydonovani (M.S. Engel & U. Kaulfuss, 2025)
- Leioproctus basirufus (Schrottky, 1920)
- Leioproctus bathycyaneus Toro, 1973
- Leioproctus bicellularis (Ducke, 1910)
- Leioproctus bicristatus (Cockerell, 1929)
- Leioproctus bidentatus Leijs, 2018
- Leioproctus bigamicus (Strand, 1910)
- Leioproctus bimaculatus (Smith, 1879)
- Leioproctus bipectinatus (Smith, 1856)
- Leioproctus boltoni Cockerell, 1904
- Leioproctus boroniae (Cockerell, 1921)
- Leioproctus bracteatus Batley, 2025
- Leioproctus brochellus Batley, 2025
- Leioproctus brochus Batley, 2025
- Leioproctus brunerii (Ashmead, 1899)
- Leioproctus brunneipilosus Batley, 2025
- Leioproctus caeruleotinctus (Cockerell, 1905)
- Leioproctus caerulescens (Cockerell, 1929)
- Leioproctus caerulescens (Spinola, 1851)
- Leioproctus caesicitus Batley, 2025
- Leioproctus calcaratus Michener, 1965
- Leioproctus callurus (Cockerell, 1914)
- Leioproctus calvus Batley, 2025
- Leioproctus canutus Houston, 1990
- Leioproctus capillatus (Rayment, 1935)
- Leioproctus capito Houston, 1990
- Leioproctus cardaleae Maynard, 1997
- Leioproctus carinatifrons (Cockerell, 1929)
- Leioproctus carinatulus (Cockerell, 1905)
- Leioproctus carinatus (Smith, 1853)
- Leioproctus castaneigaster Batley, 2025
- Leioproctus castaneipes (Cockerell, 1914)
- Leioproctus cearensis (Ducke, 1908)
- Leioproctus centralis Leijs, 2018
- Leioproctus chaetosus Batley, 2025
- Leioproctus chalcurus (Cockerell, 1921)
- Leioproctus chalybeatus (Erichson, 1841)
- Leioproctus chrysopsis Batley, 2025
- Leioproctus chrysopyga Batley, 2025
- Leioproctus chrysostomus (Cockerell, 1917)
- Leioproctus ciliatus Maynard, 2013
- Leioproctus cinereus (Smith, 1853)
- Leioproctus clarki (Cockerell, 1929)
- Leioproctus clarus (Rayment, 1935)
- Leioproctus clivifrons Batley, 2025
- Leioproctus clypeatus (Cockerell, 1916)
- Leioproctus colletellus (Cockerell, 1905)
- Leioproctus coloratipes (Cockerell, 1933)
- Leioproctus comatus Maynard, 2013
- Leioproctus comosus Batley, 2025
- Leioproctus concavus Houston, 1990
- Leioproctus confusus Cockerell, 1904
- Leioproctus conjunctus Batley, 2025
- Leioproctus conospermi Houston, 1989
- Leioproctus consobrinus Leijs, 2018
- Leioproctus constrictus Leijs, 2018
- Leioproctus contrarius Michener, 1965
- Leioproctus coracinus Batley, 2025
- Leioproctus crassipunctatus (Urban, 1995)
- Leioproctus crenulatus Michener, 1965
- Leioproctus crinitus Maynard, 2013
- Leioproctus criniventris Batley, 2025
- Leioproctus crispus Batley, 2013
- Leioproctus cristariae (Jörgensen, 1912)
- Leioproctus cristativentris Batley, 2025
- Leioproctus cristatus (Smith, 1853)
- Leioproctus cupreus (Smith, 1853)
- Leioproctus cyaneorufus (Cockerell, 1930)
- Leioproctus cyanescens (Cockerell, 1929)
- Leioproctus cyaneus (Cockerell, 1915)
- Leioproctus cyanurus (Cockerell, 1914)
- Leioproctus cygnellus (Cockerell, 1905)
- Leioproctus dasypus Maynard, 2013
- Leioproctus davisi Maynard, 1994
- Leioproctus decoloratus (Ducke, 1908)
- Leioproctus delahozii Toro, 1973
- Leioproctus deltivagus (Ogloblin, 1948)
- Leioproctus dentatus (Rayment, 1931)
- Leioproctus dentiger (Cockerell, 1910)
- Leioproctus diloris Batley, 2025
- Leioproctus diodontus (Cockerell, 1929)
- Leioproctus dolosus Michener, 1965
- Leioproctus doreyi Batley, 2023
- Leioproctus douglasiellus Michener, 1965
- Leioproctus duplex Michener, 1989
- Leioproctus echinodori (Melo, 1996)
- Leioproctus edentatus Batley, 2025
- Leioproctus elegans Smith, 1853
- Leioproctus eraduensis (Cockerell, 1929)
- Leioproctus eremites Houston, 1990
- Leioproctus eremitulus Houston, 1990
- Leioproctus erithrogaster Toro, 1970
- Leioproctus eruditus Maynard, 2013
- Leioproctus erythropyga Maynard, 1997
- Leioproctus eucalypti (Cockerell, 1916)
- Leioproctus eugeniarum (Cockerell, 1912)
- Leioproctus eulonchopriodes Michener, 1989
- Leioproctus euphenax (Cockerell, 1913)
- Leioproctus euscopatus Batley, 2025
- Leioproctus excubitor Houston, 1991
- Leioproctus exiguus Maynard, 2013
- Leioproctus exilicrinitus Batley, 2025
- Leioproctus exleyae Maynard, 2013
- Leioproctus facialis (Cockerell, 1921)
- Leioproctus fallax (Cockerell, 1921)
- Leioproctus fasciatus (Schrottky, 1920)
- Leioproctus fazii (Herbst, 1923)
- Leioproctus ferrisi (Rayment, 1935)
- Leioproctus ferrugineus (Moure, 1954)
- Leioproctus festivus (Cockerell, 1929)
- Leioproctus fiebrigi (Brèthes, 1909)
- Leioproctus filamentosus (Rayment, 1959)
- Leioproctus fimbriatinus (Cockerell, 1910)
- Leioproctus fimbriatus Smith, 1879
- Leioproctus finkei Michener, 1965
- Leioproctus flavicornis (Spinola, 1851)
- Leioproctus flavimandibulatus Batley, 2025
- Leioproctus flavipedatus Batley, 2025
- Leioproctus flavitarsus Toro, 1973
- Leioproctus flavomaculatus (Cockerell, 1905)
- Leioproctus flavorufus (Cockerell, 1905)
- Leioproctus floccosus Maynard, 1992
- Leioproctus franki (Friese, 1908)
- Leioproctus frankiellus Michener, 1965
- Leioproctus frenchi (Cockerell, 1929)
- Leioproctus friesei (Jörgensen, 1912)
- Leioproctus friesellus Michener, 1965
- Leioproctus fucosus Michener, 1989
- Leioproctus fulvescens (Smith, 1876)
- Leioproctus fulvoniger Michener, 1989
- Leioproctus fulvus (Moure & Urban, 1995)
- Leioproctus fulvus (Smith, 1879)
- Leioproctus gagateus Batley, 2025
- Leioproctus gallipes (Cockerell, 1913)
- Leioproctus gaudii Batley, 2025
- Leioproctus gelasinatus Batley, 2025
- Leioproctus gibber Batley, 2013
- Leioproctus glendae Batley & Popic, 2016
- Leioproctus goonooensis Batley, 2025
- Leioproctus guaritarus (Urban, 1995)
- Leioproctus gurneyi Batley, 2013
- Leioproctus hackeri (Cockerell, 1918)
- Leioproctus haemodori Batley & Houston, 2023
- Leioproctus halictiformis (Smith, 1879)
- Leioproctus hamatus Maynard, 1994
- Leioproctus hardyi (Cockerell, 1929)
- Leioproctus helichrysi (Cockerell, 1918)
- Leioproctus helmsi (Cockerell, 1929)
- Leioproctus herrerae Toro, 1968
- Leioproctus heterodoxus (Cockerell, 1916)
- Leioproctus hillieri (Cockerell, 1914)
- Leioproctus hirtipes (Smith, 1878)
- Leioproctus hobartensis (Cockerell, 1906)
- Leioproctus huakiwi Donovan, 2007
- Leioproctus hudsoni (Cockerell, 1925)
- Leioproctus humerosus (Smith, 1879)
- Leioproctus ibanezii (Ruiz, 1944)
- Leioproctus ibex (Cockerell, 1914)
- Leioproctus ichneumonoides (Cockerell, 1906)
- Leioproctus idiotropoptera Packer, 2006
- Leioproctus ignicolor Maynard, 1992
- Leioproctus iheringi (Schrottky, 1910)
- Leioproctus illawarraensis (Rayment, 1954)
- Leioproctus imitator (Rayment, 1959)
- Leioproctus imitatus Smith, 1853
- Leioproctus impatellatus Michener, 1965
- Leioproctus impolitus Batley, 2025
- Leioproctus incanescens (Cockerell, 1913)
- Leioproctus incomptus (Cockerell, 1921)
- Leioproctus inconspicuus Michener, 1989
- Leioproctus insitus Maynard, 2013
- Leioproctus insularis (Cockerell, 1913)
- Leioproctus irroratus (Smith, 1853)
- Leioproctus isabelae (Urban, 1995)
- Leioproctus jenseni (Friese, 1906)
- Leioproctus joergenseni (Friese, 1908)
- Leioproctus kalen Toro, 2000
- Leioproctus kanapuu Donovan, 2007
- Leioproctus keehua Donovan, 2007
- Leioproctus korungensis Batley, 2025
- Leioproctus kumarina Houston, 1990
- Leioproctus labratus (Melo, 1996)
- Leioproctus laciniosus Leijs, 2018
- Leioproctus lanceolatus Houston, 1990
- Leioproctus lanhami Michener, 1965
- Leioproctus laticeps (Friese, 1906)
- Leioproctus latifrons Batley, 2013
- Leioproctus latipes Batley, 2025
- Leioproctus launcestonensis (Cockerell, 1914)
- Leioproctus leaena (Vachal, 1909)
- Leioproctus leai (Cockerell, 1913)
- Leioproctus leucostomus (Cockerell, 1917)
- Leioproctus litotes Maynard, 2013
- Leioproctus longipalpus Houston, 1990
- Leioproctus longipes (Jörgensen, 1912)
- Leioproctus longivultu Leijs, 2018
- Leioproctus lucanus Houston, 1990
- Leioproctus lucidicinctus Houston, 1990
- Leioproctus lucidulus (Cockerell, 1933)
- Leioproctus lucidus Leijs, 2018
- Leioproctus macalpinei Batley, 2025
- Leioproctus macmillani Houston, 1991
- Leioproctus macrodontus (Rayment, 1935)
- Leioproctus macropunctatus Batley, 2025
- Leioproctus maculatus (Rayment, 1930)
- Leioproctus malpighiacearum (Ducke, 1907)
- Leioproctus maorium (Cockerell, 1913)
- Leioproctus maritimus (Cockerell, 1936)
- Leioproctus mas Michener, 1965
- Leioproctus mastersi (Cockerell, 1929)
- Leioproctus megachalceus (Cockerell, 1913)
- Leioproctus megachalcoides Michener, 1965
- Leioproctus megadontus (Cockerell, 1913)
- Leioproctus melanocyaneus Toro, 1973
- Leioproctus melanoproctus Michener, 1965
- Leioproctus melanopsis Batley, 2023
- Leioproctus melanurus (Cockerell, 1917)
- Leioproctus melbournensis (Cockerell, 1910)
- Leioproctus metallescens (Cockerell, 1914)
- Leioproctus metallicus (Smith, 1853)
- Leioproctus michenerianus (Almeida, 2008)
- Leioproctus microdontus (Cockerell, 1929)
- Leioproctus microsomus Michener, 1965
- Leioproctus mimulus (Cockerell, 1910)
- Leioproctus minimus Michener, 1965
- Leioproctus minor (Moure & Urban, 1995)
- Leioproctus minutus (Cockerell, 1916)
- Leioproctus missionica (Ogloblin, 1948)
- Leioproctus moerens (Vachal, 1909)
- Leioproctus moniliformis (Cockerell, 1916)
- Leioproctus monticola (Cockerell, 1925)
- Leioproctus morsus (Cockerell, 1907)
- Leioproctus mourei Toro, 1968
- Leioproctus mourellus Michener, 1989
- Leioproctus muelleri (Houston & Maynard, 2012)
- Leioproctus mungoensis Batley, 2025
- Leioproctus murinus Batley, 2025
- Leioproctus mutabilis Batley, 2025
- Leioproctus nanus (Smith, 1879)
- Leioproctus nasutiformis Batley, 2025
- Leioproctus nasutus Houston, 1990
- Leioproctus neotropicus (Friese, 1908)
- Leioproctus nicholsoni (Cockerell, 1929)
- Leioproctus nigrescens (Cockerell, 1929)
- Leioproctus nigriceps (Friese, 1916)
- Leioproctus nigrifrons Michener, 1965
- Leioproctus nigritulus (Cockerell, 1916)
- Leioproctus nigroclypeatus (Cockerell, 1910)
- Leioproctus nigrofulvus (Cockerell, 1914)
- Leioproctus nigropurpureus (Rayment, 1935)
- Leioproctus nitidifuscus Leijs, 2018
- Leioproctus nitidior (Moure, 1956)
- Leioproctus nitidulus (Cockerell, 1916)
- Leioproctus nix Batley, 2013
- Leioproctus nomadiformis (Cockerell, 1921)
- Leioproctus nomiaeformis (Cockerell, 1930)
- Leioproctus nudiventris Batley, 2025
- Leioproctus nunui Donovan, 2007
- Leioproctus obscuripennis (Cockerell, 1905)
- Leioproctus obscurus (Smith, 1853)
- Leioproctus opacior (Cockerell, 1936)
- Leioproctus opaculus (Cockerell, 1929)
- Leioproctus orientalis (Vachal, 1904)
- Leioproctus ornatissimus (Cockerell, 1916)
- Leioproctus otautahi Donovan, 2007
- Leioproctus paahaumaa Donovan, 2007
- Leioproctus pachygenatus Batley, 2025
- Leioproctus pachyodontus (Cockerell, 1915)
- Leioproctus pachyramus Batley, 2025
- Leioproctus pacificus Michener, 1965
- Leioproctus pallidicinctus (Rayment, 1953)
- Leioproctus pallidus (Moure & Urban, 1995)
- Leioproctus pallidus (Cockerell, 1915)
- Leioproctus palpalis (Ducke, 1908)
- Leioproctus pampeanus (Urban, 1995)
- Leioproctus pango Donovan, 2007
- Leioproctus pappus Houston, 1989
- Leioproctus paraguayensis (Schrottky, 1907)
- Leioproctus parvus Maynard, 2013
- Leioproctus paulus Maynard, 2013
- Leioproctus pavonellus (Cockerell, 1929)
- Leioproctus pectinatus Leijs, 2018
- Leioproctus pekanui Donovan, 2007
- Leioproctus penai Toro, 1970
- Leioproctus perezi Toro, 1970
- Leioproctus perfasciatus (Cockerell, 1906)
- Leioproctus perminutus (Cockerell, 1929)
- Leioproctus perpolitus (Cockerell, 1916)
- Leioproctus persooniae (Rayment, 1950)
- Leioproctus peruvianus (Cockerell, 1926)
- Leioproctus phanerodontus (Cockerell, 1929)
- Leioproctus pharcidodes (Moure, 1954)
- Leioproctus phillipensis (Rayment, 1953)
- Leioproctus philonesus (Cockerell, 1929)
- Leioproctus pilotapilus Leijs, 2018
- Leioproctus platycephalus (Cockerell, 1912)
- Leioproctus platyceratus Batley, 2025
- Leioproctus plaumanni Michener, 1989
- Leioproctus plautus Maynard, 1991
- Leioproctus plebeius (Cockerell, 1921)
- Leioproctus plumosellus (Cockerell, 1905)
- Leioproctus plumosus (Smith, 1853)
- Leioproctus prasinus Batley, 2025
- Leioproctus prolatus Maynard, 1994
- Leioproctus providellus (Cockerell, 1905)
- Leioproctus providus (Smith, 1879)
- Leioproctus proximus (Rayment, 1935)
- Leioproctus pruinosus Michener, 1989
- Leioproctus pseudozonatus (Moure, 1954)
- Leioproctus punctatifrons Batley, 2025
- Leioproctus punctatus (Smith, 1853)
- Leioproctus purpurascens (Cockerell, 1914)
- Leioproctus purpureus (Smith, 1853)
- Leioproctus pusillus (Cockerell, 1929)
- Leioproctus pustulatus Batley, 2025
- Leioproctus pygmaeus Maynard, 2013
- Leioproctus quadrimaculatus Maynard, 2013
- Leioproctus quadripinnatus Leijs, 2018
- Leioproctus quinkanensis Leijs & Hogendoorn, 2021
- Leioproctus raymenti Michener, 1965
- Leioproctus rectangulatus (Cockerell, 1910)
- Leioproctus recurvatus Batley, 2025
- Leioproctus recusus (Cockerell, 1921)
- Leioproctus regalis (Cockerell, 1921)
- Leioproctus rejectus (Cockerell, 1905)
- Leioproctus rhodopus (Cockerell, 1914)
- Leioproctus rhodurus Michener, 1965
- Leioproctus roseoviridis (Cockerell, 1905)
- Leioproctus rostratus Batley, 2025
- Leioproctus rubellus (Smith, 1862)
- Leioproctus ruber Toro, 1970
- Leioproctus rubicundus Leijs, 2018
- Leioproctus rubiginosus (Dalla Torre, 1896)
- Leioproctus rubricinctus Leijs, 2018
- Leioproctus rubriventris (Friese, 1909)
- Leioproctus rudis (Cockerell, 1906)
- Leioproctus rudissimus (Cockerell, 1929)
- Leioproctus ruficaudus Michener, 1965
- Leioproctus ruficornis (Smith, 1879)
- Leioproctus rufipennis (Cockerell, 1917)
- Leioproctus rufipes (Cockerell, 1929)
- Leioproctus rufiventris (Spinola, 1851)
- Leioproctus rufoaeneus (Friese, 1924)
- Leioproctus rufus (Rayment, 1930)
- Leioproctus rugatus (Urban, 1995)
- Leioproctus rugosus Maynard, 2013
- Leioproctus rutiliventris Maynard, 2013
- Leioproctus saltensis (Friese, 1908)
- Leioproctus saltus Maynard, 2013
- Leioproctus sarogaster Batley, 2025
- Leioproctus scitulus (Cockerell, 1921)
- Leioproctus semicyaneus (Spinola, 1851)
- Leioproctus semilautus (Cockerell, 1905)
- Leioproctus semilucens (Cockerell, 1929)
- Leioproctus semipurpureus (Cockerell, 1905)
- Leioproctus semiviridis (Cockerell, 1930)
- Leioproctus sequax Maynard, 2013
- Leioproctus sericeus Batley, 2025
- Leioproctus sexmaculatus (Cockerell, 1914)
- Leioproctus seydi (Strand, 1910)
- Leioproctus sicatus Batley, 2025
- Leioproctus sigillatus (Cockerell, 1914)
- Leioproctus similior Michener, 1965
- Leioproctus similis Leijs, 2018
- Leioproctus simillimus (Smith, 1879)
- Leioproctus simplicicrus Michener, 1989
- Leioproctus simulator Michener, 1965
- Leioproctus singularis (Rayment, 1935)
- Leioproctus spathigerus Michener, 1989
- Leioproctus spatulatus (Cockerell, 1905)
- Leioproctus speculiferus (Cockerell, 1921)
- Leioproctus spegazzini (Jörgensen, 1912)
- Leioproctus spinescens Batley, 2025
- Leioproctus splendens Leijs, 2018
- Leioproctus stewarti (Rayment, 1947)
- Leioproctus stictus (Moure, 1954)
- Leioproctus stilborhinus (Moure, 1954)
- Leioproctus striatulus (Rayment, 1959)
- Leioproctus strigatus Batley, 2025
- Leioproctus subdentatus (Rayment, 1931)
- Leioproctus subdolus (Cockerell, 1913)
- Leioproctus submetallicus Leijs, 2018
- Leioproctus subminutus (Rayment, 1934)
- Leioproctus subpunctatus (Rayment, 1935)
- Leioproctus subvigilans (Cockerell, 1914)
- Leioproctus subviridis (Cockerell, 1915)
- Leioproctus sulcatus Batley, 2025
- Leioproctus tarsalis (Rayment, 1959)
- Leioproctus thornleighensis (Cockerell, 1906)
- Leioproctus tomentosus Houston, 1989
- Leioproctus tristis (Spinola, 1851)
- Leioproctus tritus Batley, 2025
- Leioproctus tropicalis (Cockerell, 1929)
- Leioproctus truncatulus (Cockerell, 1913)
- Leioproctus tuberculatus (Cockerell, 1913)
- Leioproctus unguidentatus Michener, 1965
- Leioproctus velutinellus Michener, 1965
- Leioproctus ventralis (Friese, 1924)
- Leioproctus versicolor (Smith, 1853)
- Leioproctus vestitus (Smith, 1876)
- Leioproctus vigilans Smith, 1879
- Leioproctus viridescens (Cockerell, 1929)
- Leioproctus viridibasis (Cockerell, 1936)
- Leioproctus viridicinctus (Cockerell, 1905)
- Leioproctus vitrifrons (Smith, 1879)
- Leioproctus wagenknechti Toro, 1970
- Leioproctus wagneri (Vachal, 1909)
- Leioproctus wahlenbergiae Michener, 1965
- Leioproctus waipounamu Donovan, 2007
- Leioproctus wanni Leijs & Hogendoorn, 2016
- Leioproctus waterhousei (Cockerell, 1905)
- Leioproctus wilsoni (Rayment, 1930)
- Leioproctus worsfoldi (Cockerell, 1906)
- Leioproctus xanthosus Maynard, 1993
- Leioproctus xanthozoster Maynard, 1997
- Leioproctus zephyr Prendergast, 2022
- Leioproctus zonatus (Moure, 1956)
