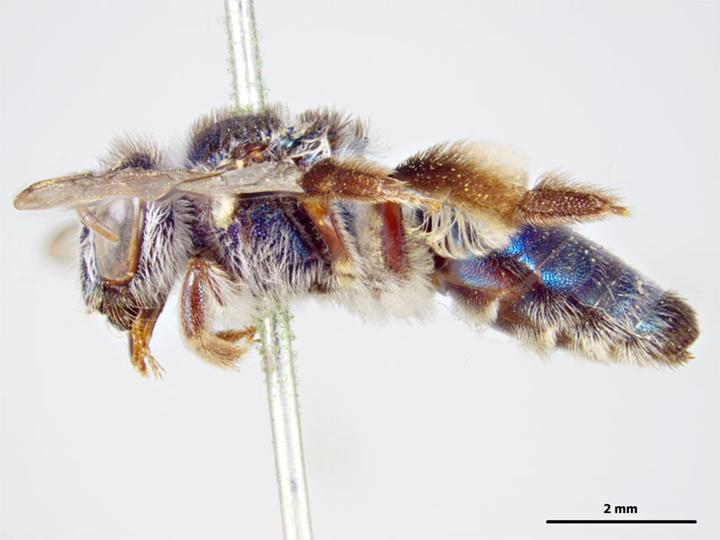
- Female

Scientific classification
- Kingdom: Animalia
- Phylum: Arthropoda
- Clade: Pancrustacea
- Class: Insecta
- Order: Hymenoptera
- Family: Colletidae
- Genus: Leioproctus
- Species: L. megadontus

Binomial name
- Leioproctus megadontus (Cockerell, 1913)

Synonyms
- Paracolletes megadontus Cockerell, 1913

= Leioproctus megadontus =

Species of bee

Leioproctus megadontus, or Leioproctus (Charicolletes) megadontus, is a species of bee in the family Colletidae and subfamily Colletinae. It is endemic to Australia. It was described by British-American entomologist Theodore Dru Alison Cockerell in 1913.

== Description ==
Female body length is about 10 mm. Colouration is mainly steel-blue with greenish tints.

== Distribution and habitat ==
The species occurs in coastal south-eastern Queensland, including offshore islands. The type locality is Caloundra.

== Behaviour ==
The adults are flying mellivores.

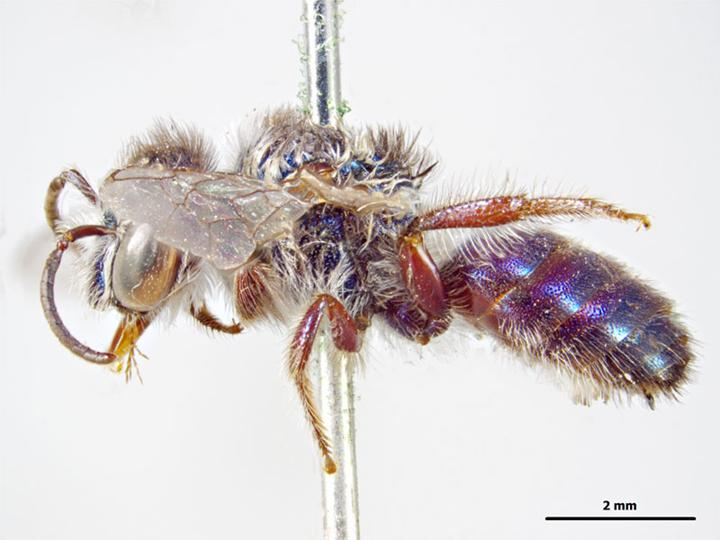
Male
