= Leioproctus apicalis =

Scientific classification
- Kingdom: Animalia
- Phylum: Arthropoda
- Clade: Pancrustacea
- Class: Insecta
- Order: Hymenoptera
- Family: Colletidae
- Genus: Leioproctus
- Species: L. apicalis

Binomial name
- Leioproctus apicalis (Cockerell, 1921)

Synonyms
- Paracolletes apicalis Cockerell, 1921

Species of bee

Leioproctus apicalis, or Leioproctus (Leioproctus) apicalis, is a species of bee in the family Colletidae and subfamily Colletinae. It is endemic to Australia. It was described by British-American entomologist Theodore Dru Alison Cockerell in 1921.

== Description ==
Female body length is about 8 mm. Colouration is mainly black with chestnut-red markings, and with white, reddish and black hair.

== Distribution and habitat ==
The species occurs in Western Australia. The type locality is Swan River.

== Behaviour ==
The adults are flying mellivores.
