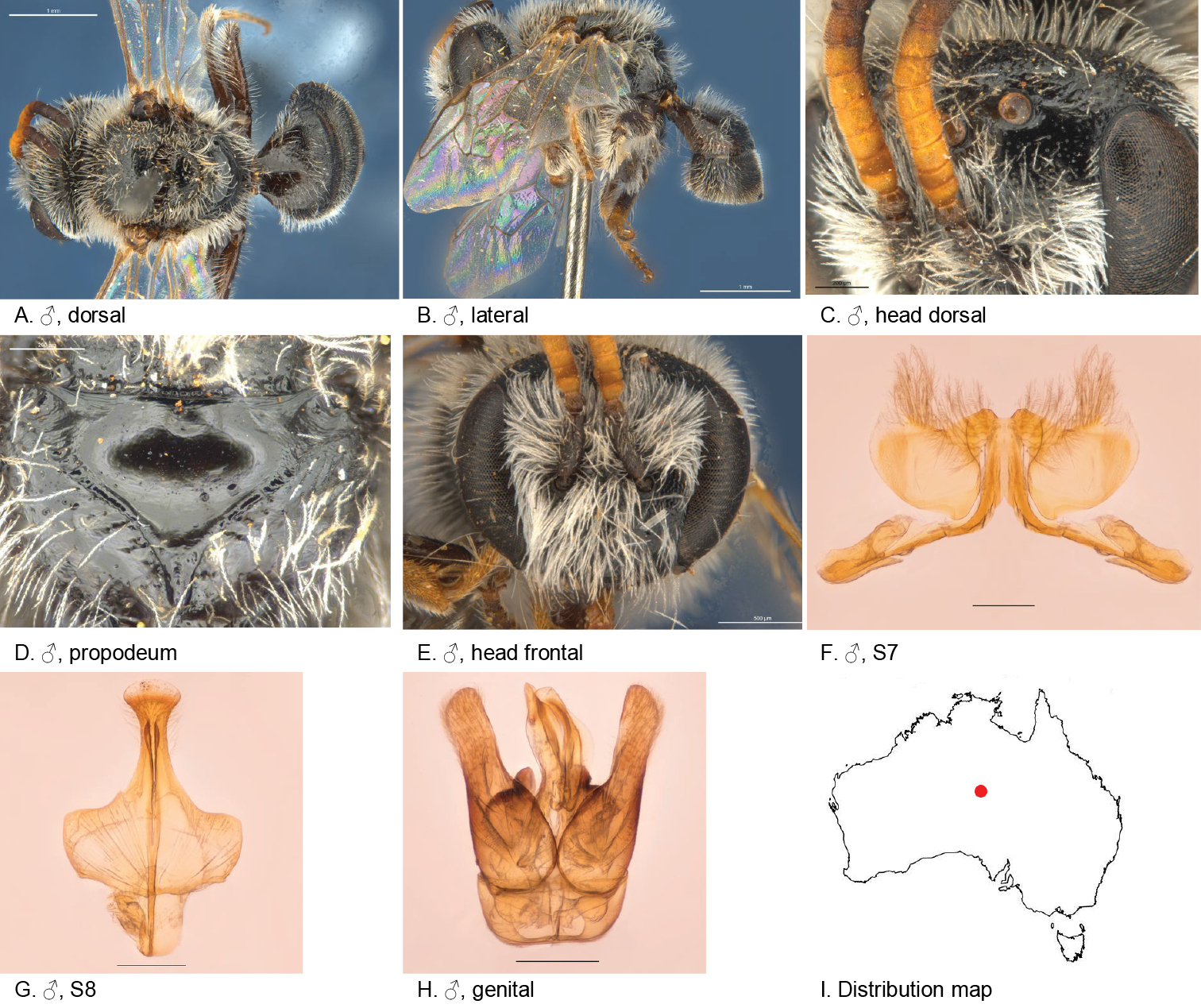
- Male holotype

Scientific classification
- Kingdom: Animalia
- Phylum: Arthropoda
- Clade: Pancrustacea
- Class: Insecta
- Order: Hymenoptera
- Family: Colletidae
- Genus: Leioproctus
- Species: L. auricorneus

Binomial name
- Leioproctus auricorneus Leijs 2018

= Leioproctus auricorneus =

Species of bee

Leioproctus auricorneus, or Leioproctus (Colletellus) auricorneus, is a species of bee in the family Colletidae and subfamily Colletinae. It is endemic to Australia. It was described by entomologist Remko Leijs in 2018.

== Etymology ==
The specific epithet auricorneus is a reference to the orange antennae.

== Description ==
The male holotype body length is 4.9 mm, head width 1.7 mm. Integumental colouration is mainly black with brown markings, antennae orange. The hair is white.

== Distribution and habitat ==
The species occurs in central Australia. The type locality is 56 km south-east of Alice Springs in the south of the Northern Territory.

== Behaviour ==
The adults are flying mellivores.
