= Leioproctus rudis =

Scientific classification
- Kingdom: Animalia
- Phylum: Arthropoda
- Clade: Pancrustacea
- Class: Insecta
- Order: Hymenoptera
- Family: Colletidae
- Genus: Leioproctus
- Species: L. rudis

Binomial name
- Leioproctus rudis (Cockerell, 1906)

Synonyms
- Paracolletes rudis Cockerell, 1906

Species of bee

Leioproctus rudis, or Leioproctus (Leioproctus) rudis, is a species of bee in the family Colletidae and subfamily Colletinae. It is endemic to Australia. It was described by British-American entomologist Theodore Dru Alison Cockerell in 1906.

== Distribution and habitat ==
The species occurs in south-west Western Australia. The type locality is Swan River.

== Behaviour ==
The adults are flying mellivores.
