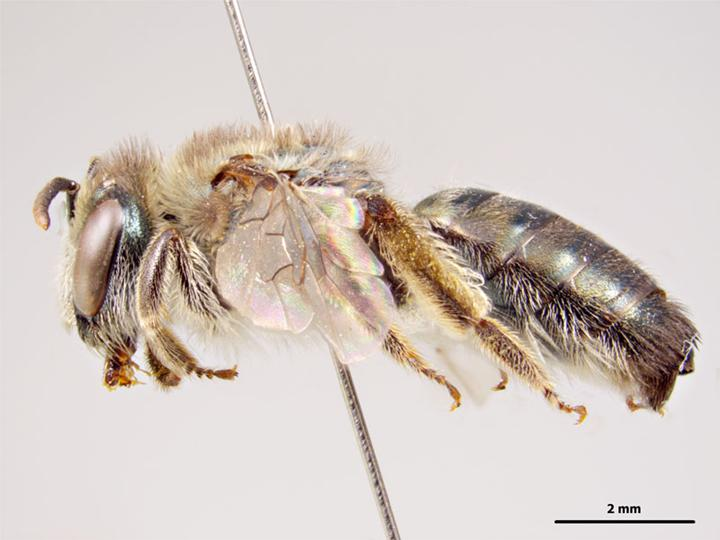
- Female

Scientific classification
- Kingdom: Animalia
- Phylum: Arthropoda
- Clade: Pancrustacea
- Class: Insecta
- Order: Hymenoptera
- Family: Colletidae
- Genus: Leioproctus
- Species: L. clarki

Binomial name
- Leioproctus clarki (Cockerell, 1929)

Synonyms
- Paracolletes melbournensis clarki Cockerell, 1929

= Leioproctus clarki =

Species of bee

Leioproctus clarki, or Leioproctus (Leioproctus) clarki, is a species of bee in the family Colletidae and subfamily Colletinae. It is endemic to Australia. It was described by British-American entomologist Theodore Dru Alison Cockerell in 1929.

== Description ==
Female body length is about 11 mm. Integumental colouration is mainly black; abdomen olive green; hair is white to dark grey.

== Distribution and habitat ==
The species occurs across much of southern Australia. The type locality is Perth.

== Behaviour ==
The adults are flying mellivores.

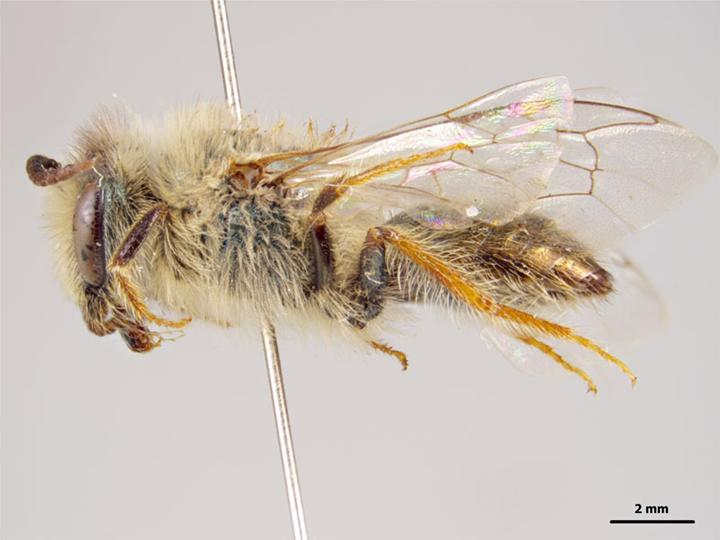
Male
