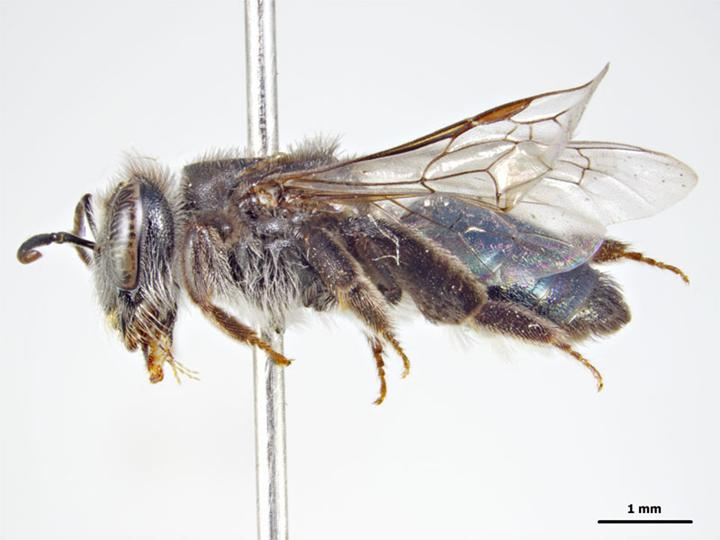
- Female

Scientific classification
- Kingdom: Animalia
- Phylum: Arthropoda
- Clade: Pancrustacea
- Class: Insecta
- Order: Hymenoptera
- Family: Colletidae
- Genus: Leioproctus
- Species: L. carinatus

Binomial name
- Leioproctus carinatus (Smith, 1853)

Synonyms
- Lamprocolletes carinatus Smith, 1853

= Leioproctus carinatus =

Species of bee

Leioproctus carinatus, or Leioproctus (Leioproctus) carinatus, is a species of bee in the family Colletidae and subfamily Colletinae. It is endemic to Australia. It was described by English entomologist Frederick Smith in 1853.

== Distribution and habitat ==
The species occurs in eastern Australia. The exact type locality is unknown.

== Behaviour ==
The adults are flying mellivores.
