= Leioproctus exiguus =

Scientific classification
- Kingdom: Animalia
- Phylum: Arthropoda
- Clade: Pancrustacea
- Class: Insecta
- Order: Hymenoptera
- Family: Colletidae
- Genus: Leioproctus
- Species: L. exiguus

Binomial name
- Leioproctus exiguus Maynard 2013

Species of bee

Leioproctus exiguus, or Leioproctus (Minycolletes) eruditus, is a species of bee in the family Colletidae and subfamily Colletinae. It is endemic to Australia. It was described by Australian entomologist Glynn Maynard in 2013.

== Etymology ==
The specific epithet exiguus is Latin for "small".

== Description ==
Male body length is about 6 mm. Integumental colouration is mainly black. The hair is white.

== Distribution and habitat ==
The species occurs in Western Australia. The type locality is near Carnarvon.

== Behaviour ==
The adults are flying mellivores.
