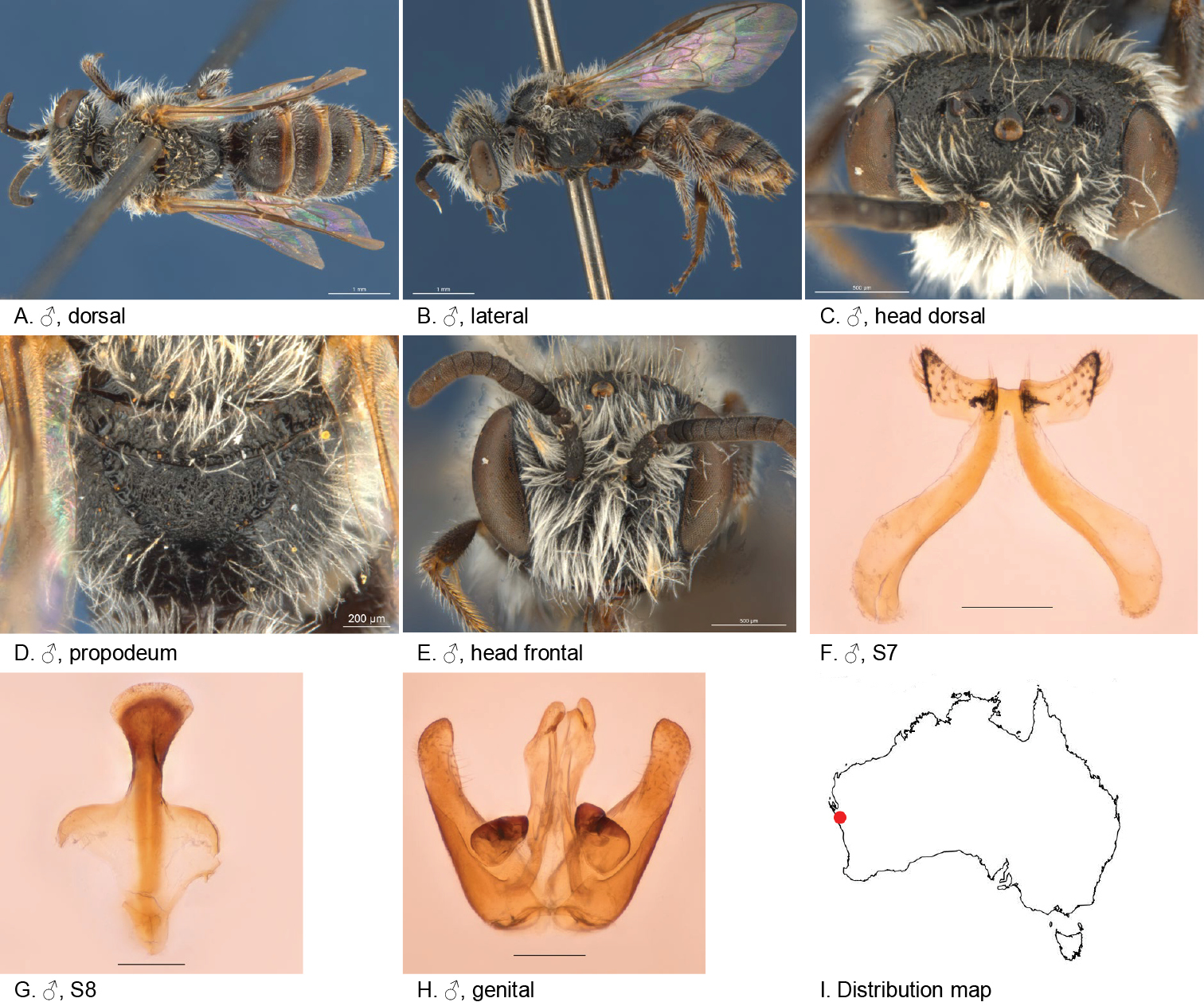
- Male holotype

Scientific classification
- Kingdom: Animalia
- Phylum: Arthropoda
- Clade: Pancrustacea
- Class: Insecta
- Order: Hymenoptera
- Family: Colletidae
- Genus: Leioproctus
- Species: L. altispinosus

Binomial name
- Leioproctus altispinosus Leijs 2018

= Leioproctus altispinosus =

Species of bee

Leioproctus altispinosus, or Leioproctus (Colletellus) altispinosus, is a species of bee in the family Colletidae and subfamily Colletinae. It is endemic to Australia. It was described by entomologist Remko Leijs in 2018.

== Etymology ==
The specific epithet altispinosus is both an anatomical reference to the robust setae on the tip of the ventral apical lobe of male sterna 7, and a translation of the name of the authors’ linguistic advisor Wiebe Hogendoorn.

== Description ==
The male holotype body length is 5.8 mm, head width 2 mm. Integumental colouration is mainly black, with orange and brown markings. The hair is mostly white.

== Distribution and habitat ==
The species occurs in Western Australia. The type locality is 25 km south-west of Tangadee in the Mid West region.

== Behaviour ==
The adults are flying mellivores. Flowering plants visited by the bees include Parakeelya polyandra and Dicrastylis flexuosa.
