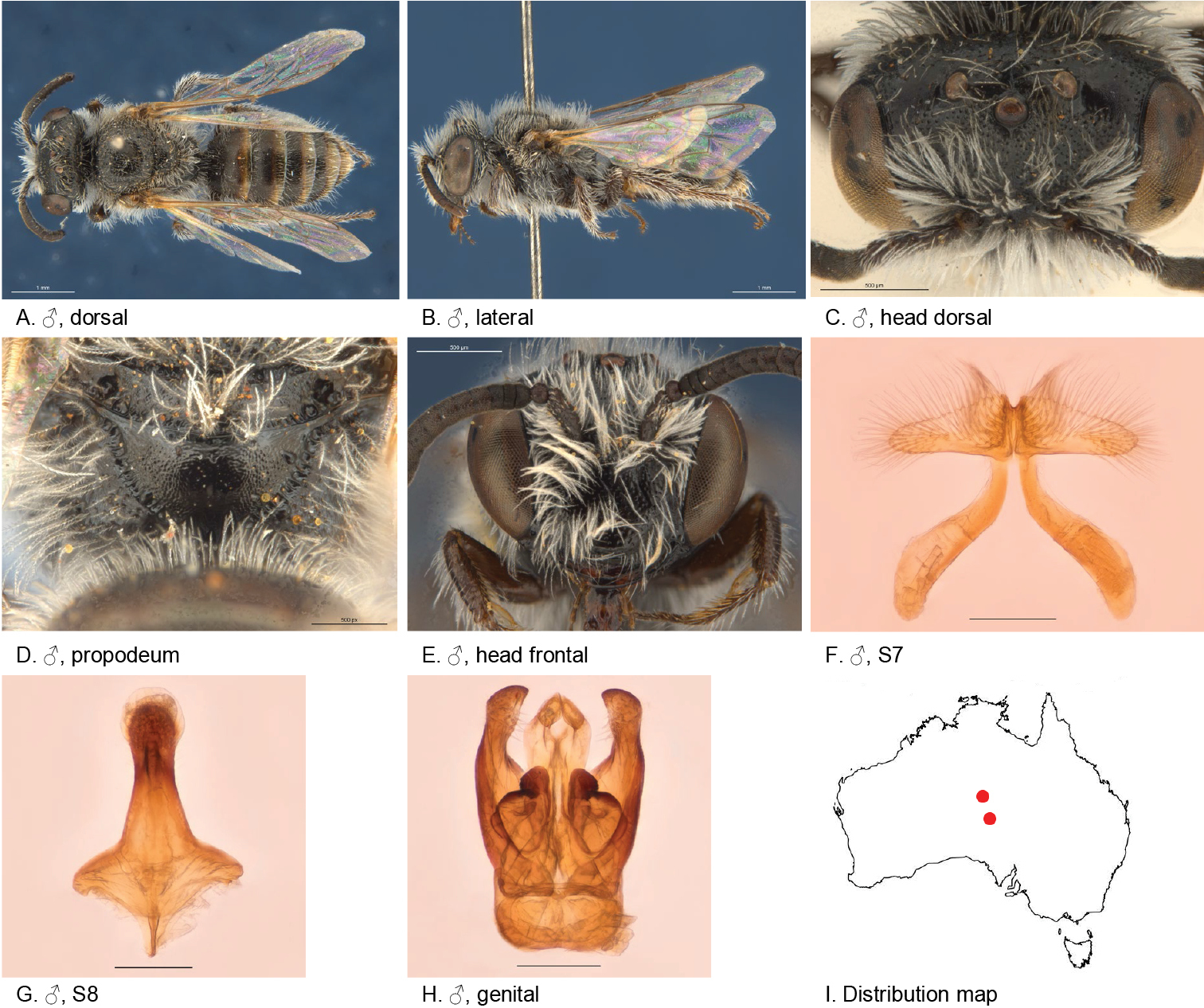
- Male holotype

Scientific classification
- Kingdom: Animalia
- Phylum: Arthropoda
- Clade: Pancrustacea
- Class: Insecta
- Order: Hymenoptera
- Family: Colletidae
- Genus: Leioproctus
- Species: L. aliceafontanus

Binomial name
- Leioproctus aliceafontanus Leijs 2018

= Leioproctus aliceafontanus =

Species of bee

Leioproctus aliceafontanus, or Leioproctus (Colletellus) aliceafontanus, is a species of bee in the family Colletidae and subfamily Colletinae. It is endemic to Australia. It was described by entomologist Remko Leijs in 2018.

== Etymology ==
The specific epithet aliceafontanus refers to the distribution of the species in the vicinity of Alice Springs.

== Description ==
The male holotype body length is 5.1 mm, head width 1.62 mm. Integumental colouration is mainly black and brown. The hair is mostly white.

== Distribution and habitat ==
The species occurs in central Australia. The type locality is the James Range, west of Alice Springs in the south of the Northern Territory.

== Behaviour ==
The adults are flying mellivores.
