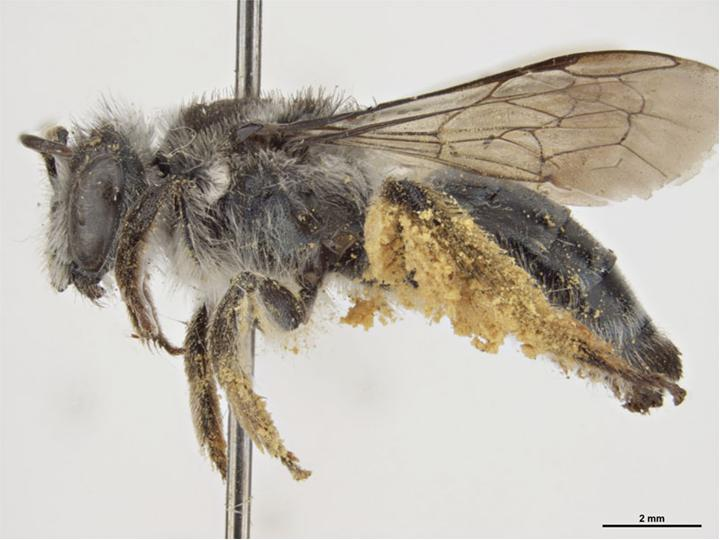
- Female

Scientific classification
- Kingdom: Animalia
- Phylum: Arthropoda
- Clade: Pancrustacea
- Class: Insecta
- Order: Hymenoptera
- Family: Colletidae
- Genus: Leioproctus
- Species: L. dentiger

Binomial name
- Leioproctus dentiger (Cockerell, 1910)

Synonyms
- Paracolletes dentiger Cockerell, 1910; Paracolletes subvigilans Cockerell, 1914

= Leioproctus dentiger =

Species of bee

Leioproctus dentiger, or Leioproctus (Lamprocolletes) dentiger, is a species of bee in the family Colletidae and subfamily Colletinae. It is endemic to Australia. It was described by British-American entomologist Theodore Dru Alison Cockerell in 1910.

== Distribution and habitat ==
The species occurs in south-west Western Australia. Type localities include Yallingup.

== Behaviour ==
The adults are flying mellivores.

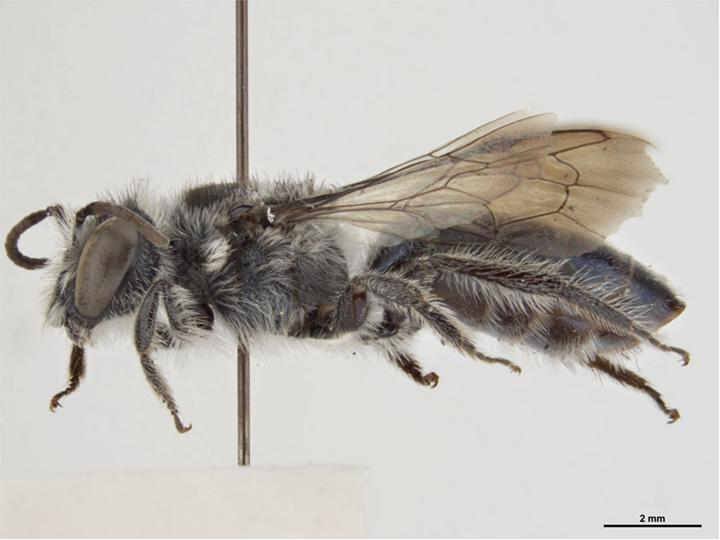
Male
