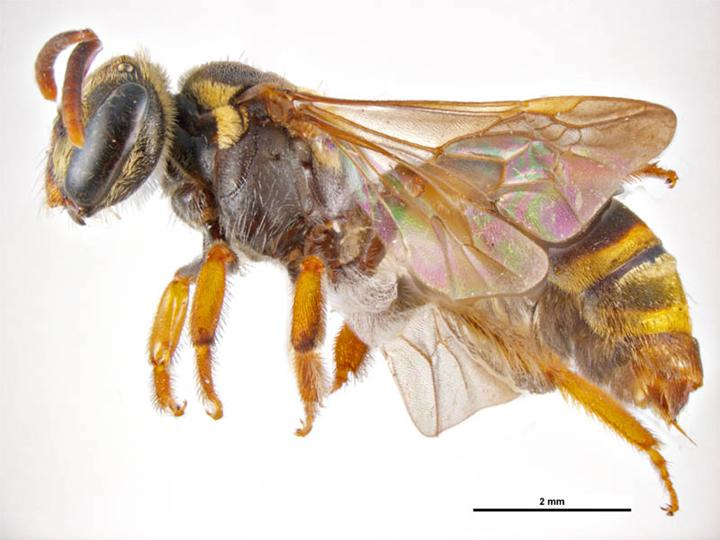
- Female

Scientific classification
- Kingdom: Animalia
- Phylum: Arthropoda
- Clade: Pancrustacea
- Class: Insecta
- Order: Hymenoptera
- Family: Colletidae
- Genus: Leioproctus
- Species: L. nomadiformis

Binomial name
- Leioproctus nomadiformis (Cockerell, 1921)

Synonyms
- Paracolletes nomadiformis Cockerell, 1921

= Leioproctus nomadiformis =

Species of bee

Leioproctus nomadiformis, or Leioproctus (Leioproctus) nomadiformis, is a species of bee in the family Colletidae and subfamily Colletinae. It is endemic to Australia. It was described by British-American entomologist Theodore Dru Alison Cockerell in 1921.

== Description ==
Male body length is about 6.5 mm. Colouration is mainly black, with orange-brown markings and reddish-orange hair.

== Distribution and habitat ==
The species occurs in Far North Queensland. The type locality is Kuranda.

== Behaviour ==
The adults are flying mellivores.
