= Leioproctus hackeri =

Scientific classification
- Kingdom: Animalia
- Phylum: Arthropoda
- Clade: Pancrustacea
- Class: Insecta
- Order: Hymenoptera
- Family: Colletidae
- Genus: Leioproctus
- Species: L. hackeri

Binomial name
- Leioproctus hackeri (Cockerell, 1918)

Synonyms
- Paracolletes hackeri Cockerell, 1918

Species of bee

Leioproctus hackeri, or Leioproctus (Leioproctus) hackeri, is a species of bee in the family Colletidae and subfamily Colletinae. It is endemic to Australia. It was described by British-American entomologist Theodore Dru Alison Cockerell in 1918.

== Description ==
Female body length is 10 mm. Colouration is mainly black; abdomen with first three segments dark steel-blue; with white, grey and black hair.

== Distribution and habitat ==
The species occurs in eastern Australia. The type locality is Brisbane.

== Behaviour ==
The adults are flying mellivores.
