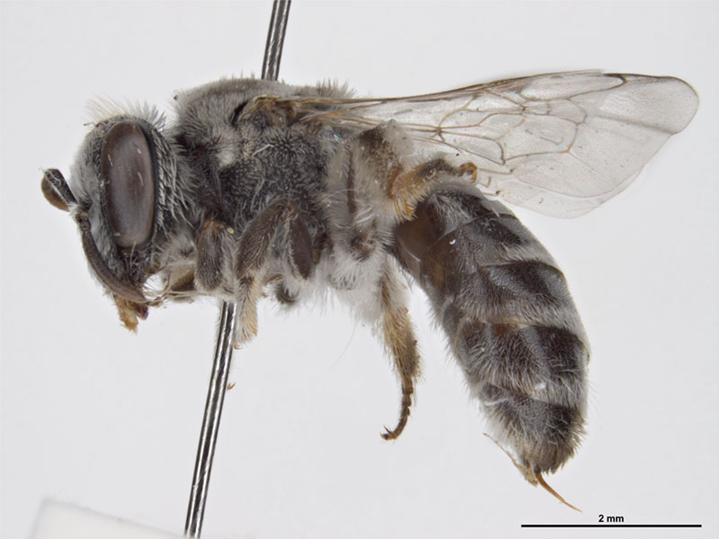
- Female

Scientific classification
- Kingdom: Animalia
- Phylum: Arthropoda
- Clade: Pancrustacea
- Class: Insecta
- Order: Hymenoptera
- Family: Colletidae
- Genus: Leioproctus
- Species: L. tropicalis

Binomial name
- Leioproctus tropicalis (Cockerell, 1929)

Synonyms
- Paracolletes tropicalis Cockerell, 1929

= Leioproctus tropicalis =

Species of bee

Leioproctus tropicalis is a species of bee in the family Colletidae and subfamily Colletinae. It is endemic to Australia. It was described by British-American entomologist Theodore Dru Alison Cockerell in 1929.

== Distribution and habitat ==
The species occurs in the Northern Territory. The type locality is Melville Island.

== Behaviour ==
The adults are flying mellivores.

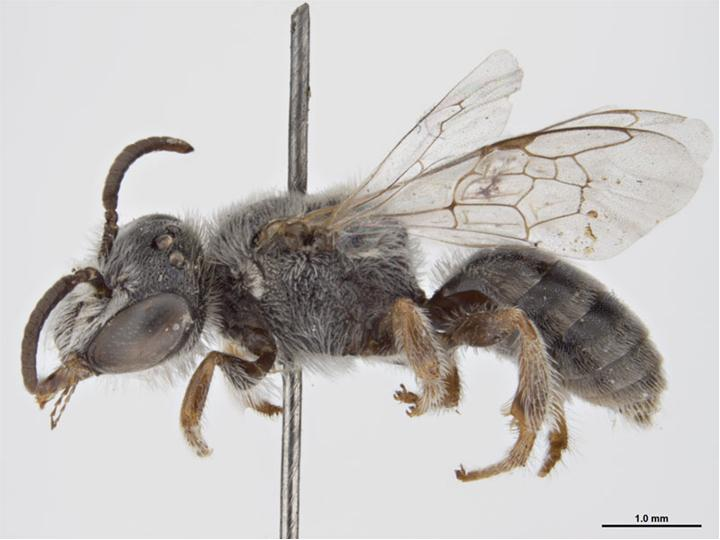
Male
