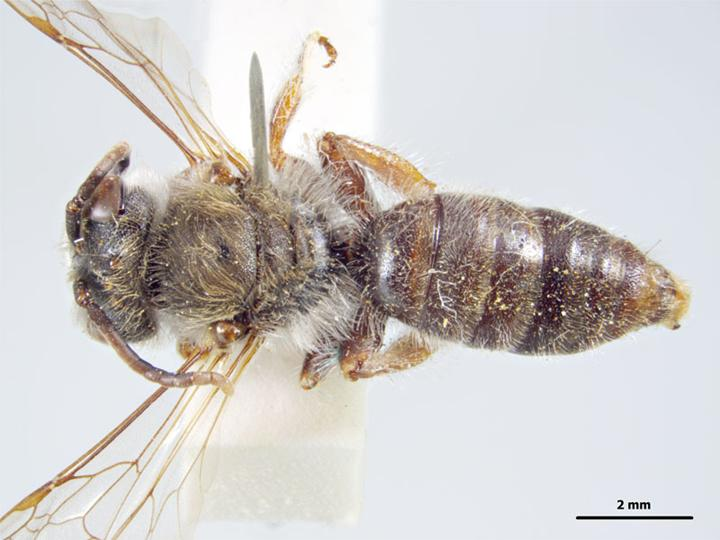
- Female

Scientific classification
- Kingdom: Animalia
- Phylum: Arthropoda
- Clade: Pancrustacea
- Class: Insecta
- Order: Hymenoptera
- Family: Colletidae
- Genus: Leioproctus
- Species: L. pavonellus

Binomial name
- Leioproctus pavonellus (Cockerell, 1929)

Synonyms
- Paracolletes pavonellus Cockerell, 1929

= Leioproctus pavonellus =

Species of bee

Leioproctus pavonellus, or Leioproctus (Leioproctus) pavonellus, is a species of bee in the family Colletidae and subfamily Colletinae. It is endemic to Australia. It was described by British-American entomologist Theodore Dru Alison Cockerell in 1929.

== Description ==
Female body length is about 9.3 mm. Colouration is mainly black and greenish; abdomen "beautiful peacock green with a dullish sericeous surface"; hair white to black and reddish.

== Distribution and habitat ==
The species occurs in south-west Western Australia. The type locality is King George Sound.

== Behaviour ==
The adults are flying mellivores.

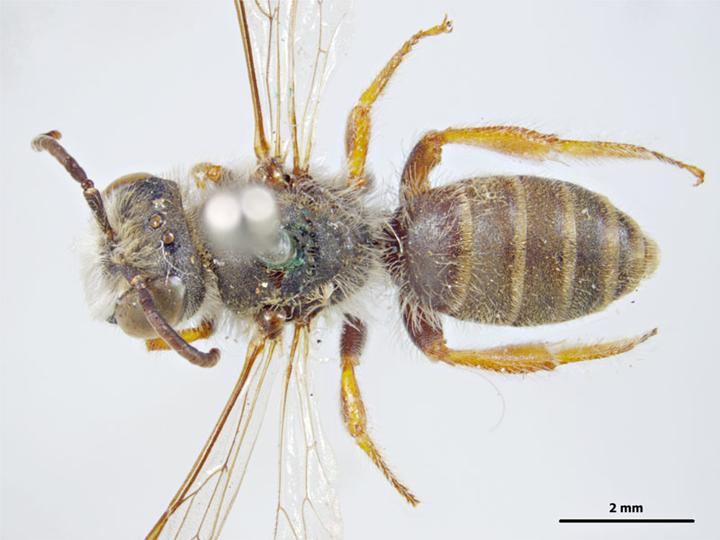
Male
