= Leioproctus argentifrons =

Scientific classification
- Kingdom: Animalia
- Phylum: Arthropoda
- Clade: Pancrustacea
- Class: Insecta
- Order: Hymenoptera
- Family: Colletidae
- Genus: Leioproctus
- Species: L. argentifrons

Binomial name
- Leioproctus argentifrons (Smith, 1879)

Synonyms
- Lamprocolletes argentifrons Smith, 1879

Species of bee

Leioproctus argentifrons, or Leioproctus (Exleycolletes) argentifrons, is a species of bee in the family Colletidae and subfamily Colletinae. It is endemic to Australia. It was described by English entomologist Frederick Smith in 1879.

== Distribution and habitat ==
The species occurs in south-west Western Australia and Victoria. The type locality is Swan River.

== Behaviour ==
The adults are flying mellivores.
