= Leioproctus hillieri =

Scientific classification
- Kingdom: Animalia
- Phylum: Arthropoda
- Clade: Pancrustacea
- Class: Insecta
- Order: Hymenoptera
- Family: Colletidae
- Genus: Leioproctus
- Species: L. hillieri

Binomial name
- Leioproctus hillieri (Cockerell, 1914)

Synonyms
- Paracolletes fimbriatinus hillieri Cockerell, 1914

Species of bee

Leioproctus hillieri, or Leioproctus (Goniocolletes) hillieri, is a species of bee in the family Colletidae and subfamily Colletinae. It is endemic to Australia. It was described by British-American entomologist Theodore Dru Alison Cockerell in 1914.

== Description ==
Male body length is about 8 mm. Colouration is mainly black, the abdomen glossy, with pale, cream-coloured hair.

== Distribution and habitat ==
The species occurs in arid central Australia. The type locality is Hermannsburg, Northern Territory.

== Behaviour ==
The adults are flying mellivores.
