= Leioproctus crinitus =

Scientific classification
- Kingdom: Animalia
- Phylum: Arthropoda
- Clade: Pancrustacea
- Class: Insecta
- Order: Hymenoptera
- Family: Colletidae
- Genus: Leioproctus
- Species: L. crinitus

Binomial name
- Leioproctus crinitus Maynard 2013

Species of bee

Leioproctus crinitus, or Leioproctus (Leioproctus) crinitus, is a species of bee in the family Colletidae and subfamily Colletinae. It is endemic to Australia. It was described by Australian entomologist Glynn Maynard in 2013.

== Etymology ==
The specific epithet crinitus (Latin: "hairy") is an anatomical reference.

== Description ==
Male body length is about 8 mm. Integumental colouration is mainly black. The hair is white.

== Distribution and habitat ==
The species occurs in arid central Australia. The type locality is 17.6 km south of Angas Downs Homestead in the south of the Northern Territory.

== Behaviour ==
The adults are flying mellivores. Flowering plants visited by the bees include Baeckea species.
