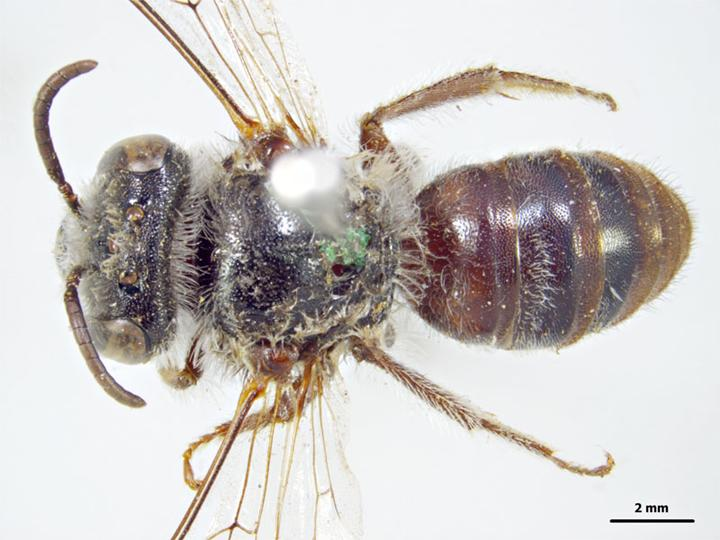
- Male

Scientific classification
- Kingdom: Animalia
- Phylum: Arthropoda
- Clade: Pancrustacea
- Class: Insecta
- Order: Hymenoptera
- Family: Colletidae
- Genus: Leioproctus
- Species: L. microdontus

Binomial name
- Leioproctus microdontus (Cockerell, 1929)

Synonyms
- Paracolletes microdontus Cockerell, 1929

= Leioproctus microdontus =

Species of bee

Leioproctus microdontus, or Leioproctus (Exleycolletes) microdontus, is a species of bee in the family Colletidae and subfamily Colletinae. It is endemic to Australia. It was described by British-American entomologist Theodore Dru Alison Cockerell in 1929.

== Description ==
Female body length is just over 10 mm. Integumental colouration is mainly black; hair is white to grey and black.

== Distribution and habitat ==
The species occurs in Western Australia. The type locality is Perth.

== Behaviour ==
The adults are flying mellivores. Flowering plants visited by the bees include Melaleuca species.
