= Leioproctus mungoensis =

Scientific classification
- Kingdom: Animalia
- Phylum: Arthropoda
- Clade: Pancrustacea
- Class: Insecta
- Order: Hymenoptera
- Family: Colletidae
- Genus: Leioproctus
- Species: L. mungoensis

Binomial name
- Leioproctus mungoensis Batley, 2025

Species of bee

Leioproctus mungoensis, or Leioproctus (Euryglossidia) mungoensis, is a species of bee in the family Colletidae and subfamily Colletinae. It is endemic to Australia. It was described by entomologist Michael Batley in 2025.

== Etymology ==
The specific epithet mungoensis refers to the type locality.

== Description ==
The female body length is 7.5 mm, the male 7.0 mm. Integumental colouration is mainly black, with brown markings. The hair is white to golden-brown.

== Distribution and habitat ==
The species occurs in south-western New South Wales. The type locality is Mungo National Park.

== Behaviour ==
The adults are flying mellivores.
