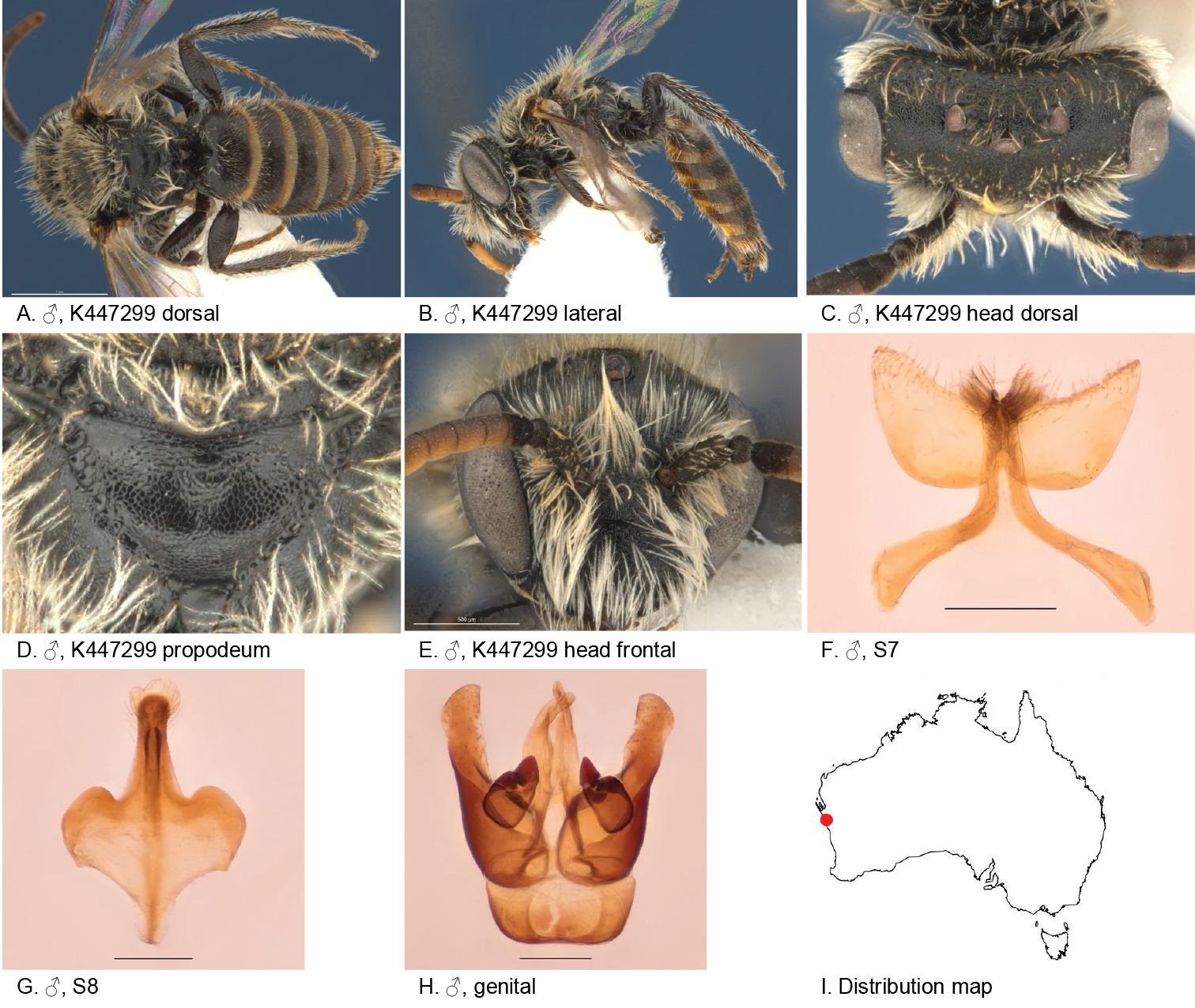
- Male holotype

Scientific classification
- Kingdom: Animalia
- Phylum: Arthropoda
- Clade: Pancrustacea
- Class: Insecta
- Order: Hymenoptera
- Family: Colletidae
- Genus: Leioproctus
- Species: L. alatus

Binomial name
- Leioproctus alatus Leijs 2018

= Leioproctus alatus =

Species of bee

Leioproctus alatus, or Leioproctus (Colletellus) alatus, is a species of bee in the family Colletidae and subfamily Colletinae. It is endemic to Australia. It was described by entomologist Remko Leijs in 2018.

== Etymology ==
The specific epithet alatus is an anatomical reference to the wing-shaped lateral lobes of the male S7.

== Description ==
The male holotype body length is 5.1 mm, head width 1.5 mm. Integumental colouration is mainly black with orange to brown markings.

== Distribution and habitat ==
The species occurs in Western Australia. The type locality is Kalbarri National Park.

== Behaviour ==
The adults are flying mellivores.
