= Leioproctus nigrescens =

Scientific classification
- Kingdom: Animalia
- Phylum: Arthropoda
- Clade: Pancrustacea
- Class: Insecta
- Order: Hymenoptera
- Family: Colletidae
- Genus: Leioproctus
- Species: L. nigrescens

Binomial name
- Leioproctus nigrescens (Cockerell, 1929)

Synonyms
- Euryglossidia nigrescens Cockerell, 1929

Species of bee

Leioproctus nigrescens, or Leioproctus (Euryglossidia) nigrescens, is a species of bee in the family Colletidae and subfamily Colletinae. It is endemic to Australia. It was described by British-American entomologist Theodore Dru Alison Cockerell in 1929.

== Description ==
Male body length is nearly 6 mm and slender; female slightly longer and more robust. Colouration is mainly black; the abdomen dark brown with a faintly greenish lustre; the hair white to grey-brown.

== Distribution and habitat ==
The species occurs in south-west Western Australia. The type locality is Geraldton.

== Behaviour ==
The adults are flying mellivores. Flowering plants visited by the bees include Hakea species.
