= Leioproctus paulus =

Scientific classification
- Kingdom: Animalia
- Phylum: Arthropoda
- Clade: Pancrustacea
- Class: Insecta
- Order: Hymenoptera
- Family: Colletidae
- Genus: Leioproctus
- Species: L. paulus

Binomial name
- Leioproctus paulus Maynard, 2013

Species of bee

Leioproctus paulus, or Leioproctus (Minycolletes) paulus, is a species of bee in the family Colletidae and subfamily Colletinae. It is endemic to Australia. It was described by Australian entomologist Glynn Maynard in 2013.

== Etymology ==
The specific epithet paulus is Latin for "little".

== Description ==
Male body length is about 7 mm. Integumental colouration is mainly black. The hair is white.

== Distribution and habitat ==
The species occurs in Western Australia. The type locality is 22 km north-east of Tamala Homestead, Shark Bay.

== Behaviour ==
The adults are flying mellivores. Flowering plants visited by the bees include Parakeelya polyandra.
