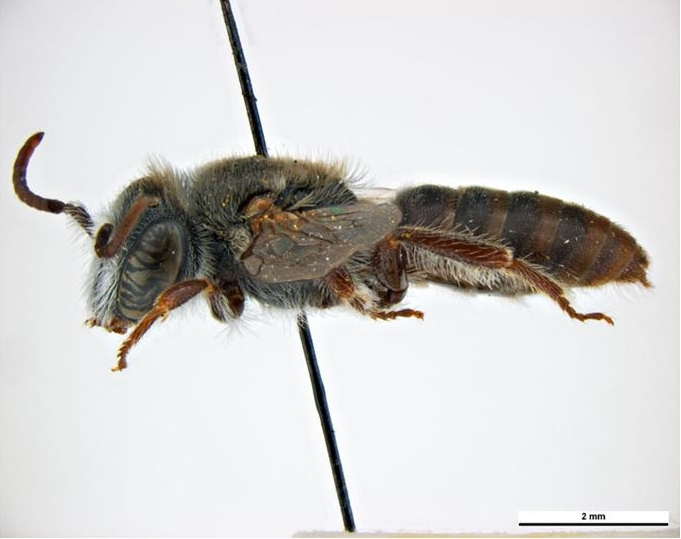
- Male

Scientific classification
- Kingdom: Animalia
- Phylum: Arthropoda
- Clade: Pancrustacea
- Class: Insecta
- Order: Hymenoptera
- Family: Colletidae
- Genus: Leioproctus
- Species: L. minutus

Binomial name
- Leioproctus minutus (Cockerell, 1916)

Synonyms
- Paracolletes minutus Cockerell, 1916; Paracolletes halictiformis Cockerell, 1916; Leioproctus (Microcolletes) halictomimus Michener, 1965

= Leioproctus minutus =

Species of bee

Leioproctus minutus, or Leioproctus (Protomorpha) minutus, is a species of bee in the family Colletidae and subfamily Colletinae. It is endemic to Australia. It was described by British-American entomologist Theodore Dru Alison Cockerell in 1916.

== Description ==
Male body length is a little over 6 mm. Colouration is mainly black, with white hair.

== Distribution and habitat ==
The species occurs in south-west Western Australia. The type locality is Yallingup.

== Behaviour ==
The adults are flying mellivores.
