= Leioproctus subpunctatus =

Scientific classification
- Kingdom: Animalia
- Phylum: Arthropoda
- Clade: Pancrustacea
- Class: Insecta
- Order: Hymenoptera
- Family: Colletidae
- Genus: Leioproctus
- Species: L. subpunctatus

Binomial name
- Leioproctus subpunctatus (Rayment, 1935)

Synonyms
- Paracolletes subpunctatus Rayment, 1935

Species of bee

Leioproctus subpunctatus, or Leioproctus (Leioproctus) subpunctatus, is a species of bee in the family Colletidae and subfamily Colletinae. It is endemic to Australia. It was described by Australian entomologist Tarlton Rayment in 1935.

== Description ==
Female body length is about 11 mm, the male 9 mm. Integumental colouration is mainly black; the hair white through pale brown and yellowish.

== Distribution and habitat ==
The species occurs in Western Australia. The type locality is Swan River.

== Behaviour ==
The adults are flying mellivores.
