= Leioproctus opaculus =

Scientific classification
- Kingdom: Animalia
- Phylum: Arthropoda
- Clade: Pancrustacea
- Class: Insecta
- Order: Hymenoptera
- Family: Colletidae
- Genus: Leioproctus
- Species: L. opaculus

Binomial name
- Leioproctus opaculus (Cockerell, 1929)

Synonyms
- Paracolletes opaculus Cockerell, 1929; Paracolletes semiviridis Cockerell, 1930

Species of bee

Leioproctus opaculus, or Leioproctus (Leioproctus) opaculus, is a species of bee in the family Colletidae and subfamily Colletinae. It is endemic to Australia. It was described by British-American entomologist Theodore Dru Alison Cockerell in 1929.

== Description ==
Female body length is about 9 mm. Colouration is mainly black, abdomen faintly greenish, hair white to grey.

== Distribution and habitat ==
The species occurs in both eastern and western Australia. Type localities include Geraldton, Western Australia, and Charleville, Queensland.

== Behaviour ==
The adults are flying mellivores.
