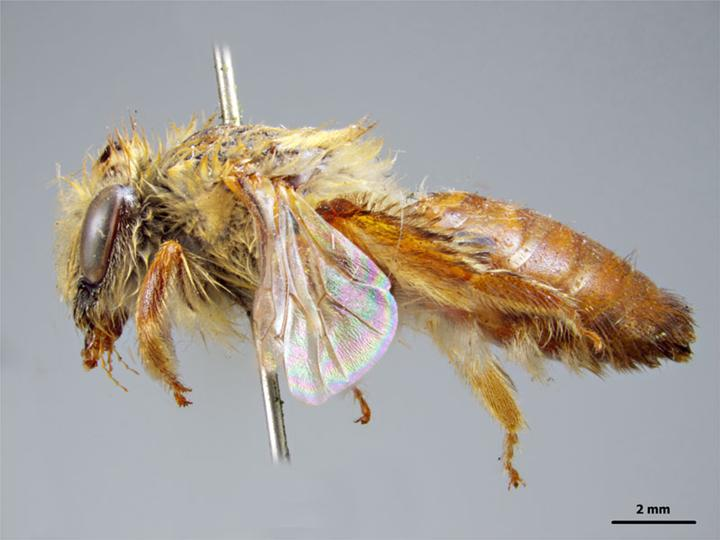
- Female

Scientific classification
- Kingdom: Animalia
- Phylum: Arthropoda
- Clade: Pancrustacea
- Class: Insecta
- Order: Hymenoptera
- Family: Colletidae
- Genus: Leioproctus
- Species: L. bimaculatus

Binomial name
- Leioproctus bimaculatus (Smith, 1879)

Synonyms
- Lamprocolletes bimaculatus Smith, 1879

= Leioproctus bimaculatus =

Species of bee

Leioproctus bimaculatus, or Leioproctus (Leioproctus) bimaculatus, is a species of bee in the family Colletidae and subfamily Colletinae. It is endemic to Australia. It was described by English entomologist Frederick Smith in 1879.

== Distribution and habitat ==
The species occurs in Western Australia. The type locality is Swan River.

== Behaviour ==
The adults are flying mellivores.

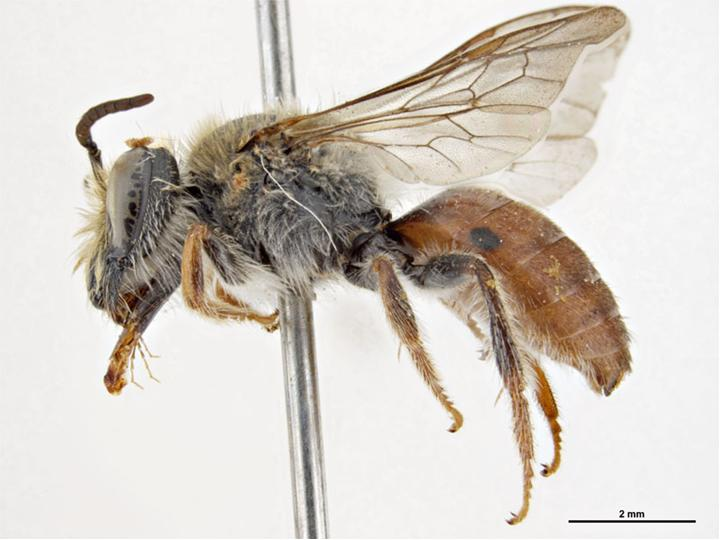
Male
