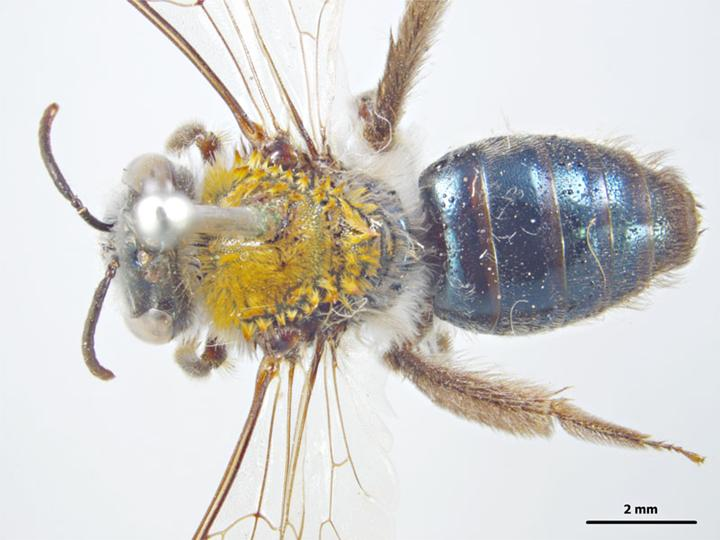
- Female

Scientific classification
- Kingdom: Animalia
- Phylum: Arthropoda
- Clade: Pancrustacea
- Class: Insecta
- Order: Hymenoptera
- Family: Colletidae
- Genus: Leioproctus
- Species: L. friesellus

Binomial name
- Leioproctus friesellus Michener, 1965

Synonyms
- Paracolletes fervidus Friese, 1924; Paracolletes friesei Cockerell, 1929

= Leioproctus friesellus =

Species of bee

Leioproctus friesellus, or Leioproctus (Leioproctus) friesellus, is a species of bee in the family Colletidae and subfamily Colletinae. It is endemic to Australia. It was described by American entomologist Charles Duncan Michener in 1965.

== Distribution and habitat ==
The species occurs across southern mainland Australia. Type localities include Fremantle and King George Sound in Western Australia.

== Behaviour ==
The adults are flying mellivores. Flowering plants visited by the bees include Melaleuca species.
