= Leioproctus worsfoldi =

Scientific classification
- Kingdom: Animalia
- Phylum: Arthropoda
- Clade: Pancrustacea
- Class: Insecta
- Order: Hymenoptera
- Family: Colletidae
- Genus: Leioproctus
- Species: L. worsfoldi

Binomial name
- Leioproctus worsfoldi (Cockerell, 1906)

Synonyms
- Paracolletes worsfoldi Cockerell, 1906

Species of bee

Leioproctus worsfoldi, or Leioproctus (Zosterocolletes) worsfoldi, is a species of bee in the family Colletidae and subfamily Colletinae. It is endemic to Australia. It was described by British-American entomologist Theodore Dru Alison Cockerell in 1906.

== Description ==
Body length of female is about 10.5 mm. Colouration is mainly black, with narrow white metasomal hair-bands.

== Distribution and habitat ==
The species occurs in south-west Western Australia.

== Behaviour ==
The adults are flying mellivores.
