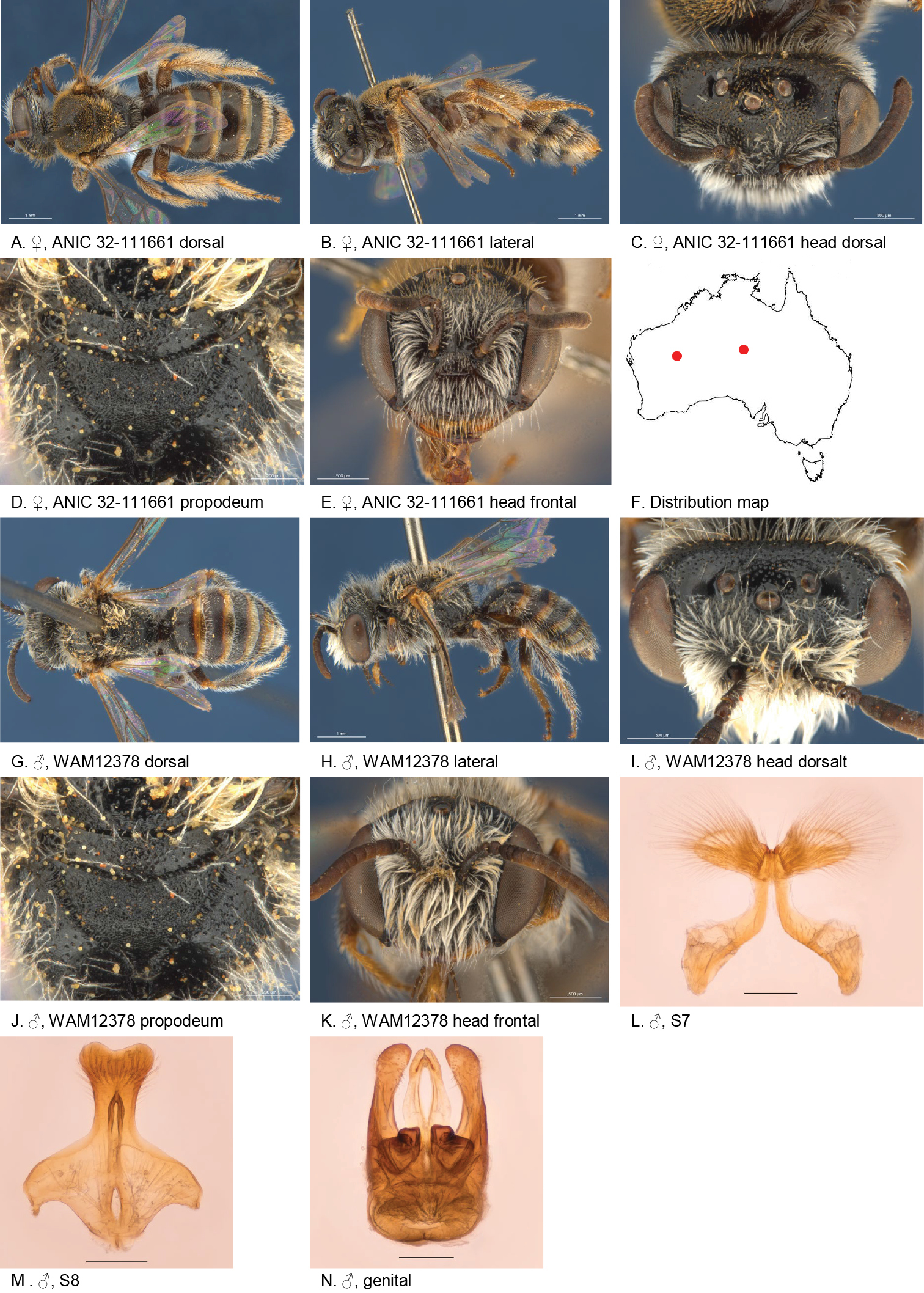
- Female holotype and male allotype

Scientific classification
- Kingdom: Animalia
- Phylum: Arthropoda
- Clade: Pancrustacea
- Class: Insecta
- Order: Hymenoptera
- Family: Colletidae
- Genus: Leioproctus
- Species: L. centralis

Binomial name
- Leioproctus centralis Leijs 2018

= Leioproctus centralis =

Species of bee

Leioproctus centralis, or Leioproctus (Colletellus) centralis, is a species of bee in the family Colletidae and subfamily Colletinae. It is endemic to Australia. It was described by entomologist Remko Leijs in 2018.

== Etymology ==
The specific epithet centralis refers to the species’ known geographical range.

== Description ==
The female holotype body length is 6.5 mm, head width 2.2 mm; male allotype body length 6.3 mm, head width 1.95 mm. Integumental colouration is mainly black, orange and brown. The hair is white to grey and orange-brown.

== Distribution and habitat ==
The species occurs in arid inland western and central Australia. Type localities include sites 56 km south-east of Alice Springs in the Northern Territory, and 37 km west of Glenayle Homestead in Western Australia.

== Behaviour ==
The adults are flying mellivores. Flowering plants visited by the bees include Calotis multicaulis and Podolepis canescens.

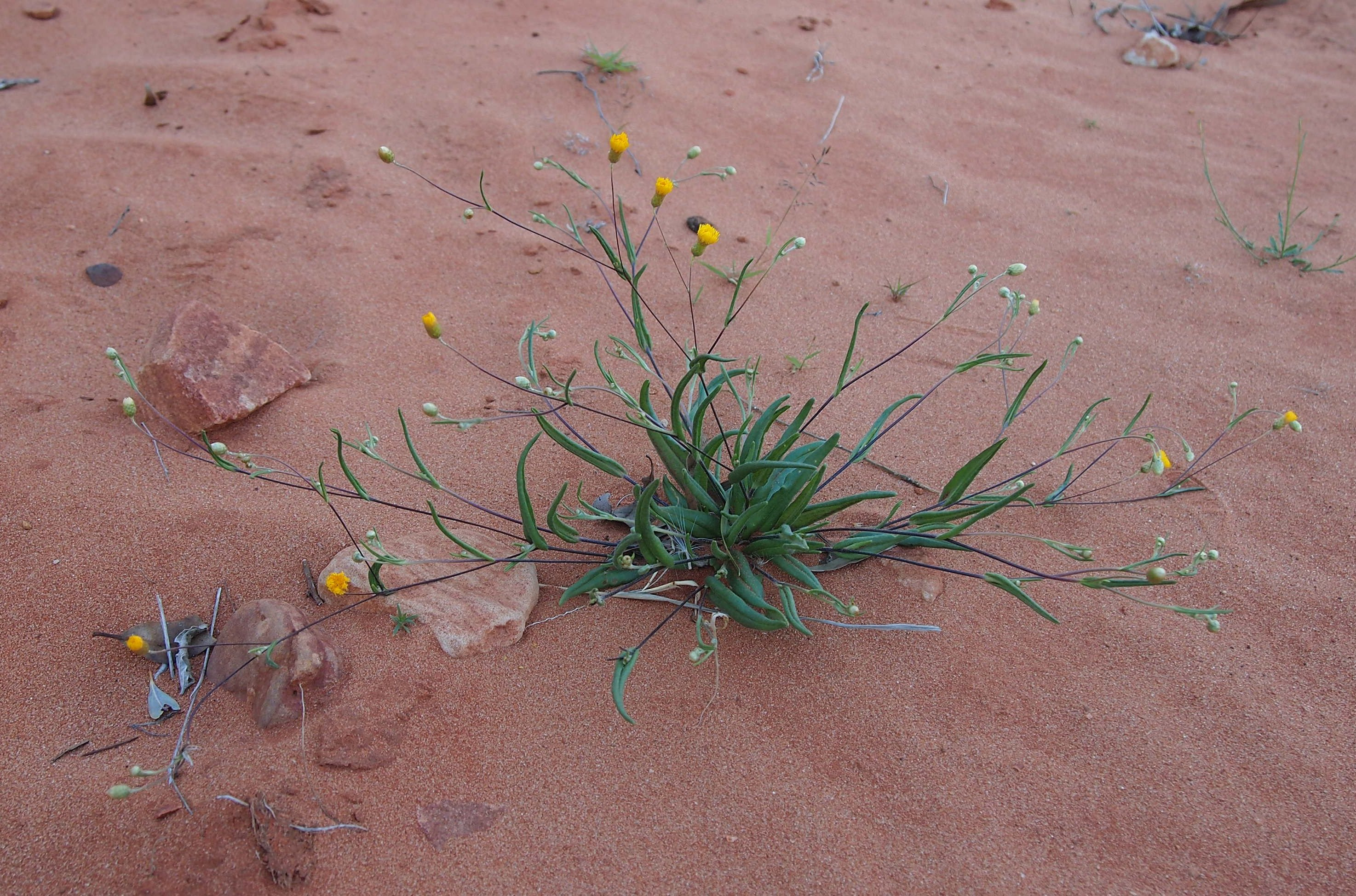
Podolepis canescens (large copper wire daisy), a forage plant of the bees
