= Leioproctus albovittatus =

Scientific classification
- Kingdom: Animalia
- Phylum: Arthropoda
- Clade: Pancrustacea
- Class: Insecta
- Order: Hymenoptera
- Family: Colletidae
- Genus: Leioproctus
- Species: L. albovittatus

Binomial name
- Leioproctus albovittatus (Cockerell, 1929)

Synonyms
- Paracolletes albovittatus Cockerell, 1929

Species of bee

Leioproctus albovittatus is a species of bee in the family Colletidae and subfamily Colletinae. It is endemic to Australia. It was described by British-American entomologist Theodore Dru Alison Cockerell in 1929.

== Description ==
Female body length is about 9 mm. Integumental colouration is mainly glossy black; the hair is white to pale brownish and black.

== Distribution and habitat ==
The species occurs in Western Australia. The type locality is Eradu in the Mid West region.

== Behaviour ==
The adults are flying mellivores.
