= Leioproctus aurescens =

Scientific classification
- Kingdom: Animalia
- Phylum: Arthropoda
- Clade: Pancrustacea
- Class: Insecta
- Order: Hymenoptera
- Family: Colletidae
- Genus: Leioproctus
- Species: L. aurescens

Binomial name
- Leioproctus aurescens (Cockerell, 1921)

Synonyms
- Paracolletes aurescens Cockerell, 1921

Species of bee

Leioproctus aurescens, or Leioproctus (Goniocolletes) aurescens, is a species of bee in the family Colletidae and subfamily Colletinae. It is endemic to Australia. It was described by British-American entomologist Theodore Dru Alison Cockerell in 1921.

== Description ==
Male body length is about 11 mm. Colouration is mainly black, with white, orange and reddish-brown hair.

== Distribution and habitat ==
The species occurs in eastern Australia. The type locality is Bribie Island in south-eastern Queensland.

== Behaviour ==
The adults are flying mellivores.
