= Leioproctus sarogaster =

Scientific classification
- Kingdom: Animalia
- Phylum: Arthropoda
- Clade: Pancrustacea
- Class: Insecta
- Order: Hymenoptera
- Family: Colletidae
- Genus: Leioproctus
- Species: L. sarogaster

Binomial name
- Leioproctus sarogaster Batley, 2025

Species of bee

Leioproctus sarogaster, or Leioproctus (Euryglossidia) sarogaster, is a species of bee in the family Colletidae and subfamily Colletinae. It is endemic to Australia. It was described by entomologist Michael Batley in 2025.

== Etymology ==
The specific epithet sarogaster (Greek: "brush + belly") is an anatomical reference to the sternal hair of the female.

== Description ==
The female body length is 5.8 mm, the male 5.9 mm. Integumental colouration is mainly black, with yellow-brown markings. The hair is white to pale brown.

== Distribution and habitat ==
The species occurs in south-west Western Australia. The type locality is 65 km east of Southern Cross in the central Wheatbelt.

== Behaviour ==
The adults are flying mellivores. Flowering plants visited by the bees include Acacia species.
