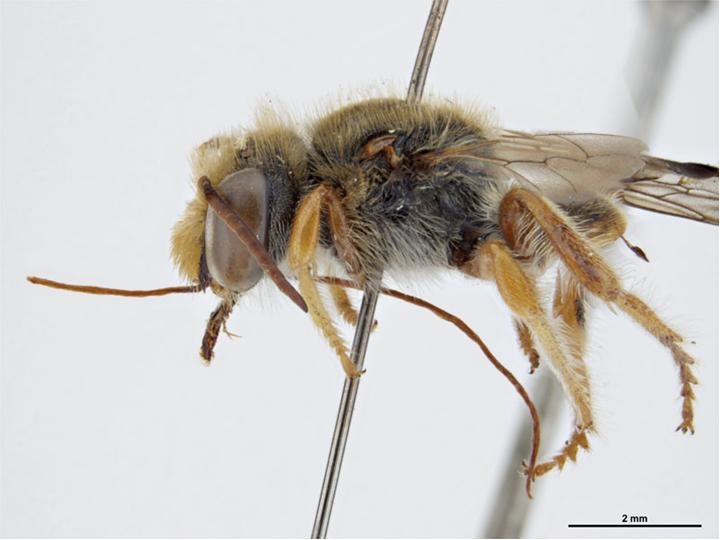
- Male

Scientific classification
- Kingdom: Animalia
- Phylum: Arthropoda
- Clade: Pancrustacea
- Class: Insecta
- Order: Hymenoptera
- Family: Colletidae
- Genus: Leioproctus
- Species: L. flavorufus

Binomial name
- Leioproctus flavorufus (Cockerell, 1905)

Synonyms
- Andrenopsis flavorufus Cockerell, 1905

= Leioproctus flavorufus =

Species of bee

Leioproctus flavorufus, or Leioproctus (Andrenopsis) flavorufus, is a species of bee in the family Colletidae and subfamily Colletinae. It is endemic to Australia. It was described by British-American entomologist Theodore Dru Alison Cockerell in 1905.

== Distribution and habitat ==
The species occurs in eastern Australia The only published locality is Sydney.

== Behaviour ==
The adults are solitary flying mellivores that nest gregariously in the ground.
