= Leioproctus sexmaculatus =

Scientific classification
- Kingdom: Animalia
- Phylum: Arthropoda
- Clade: Pancrustacea
- Class: Insecta
- Order: Hymenoptera
- Family: Colletidae
- Genus: Leioproctus
- Species: L. sexmaculatus

Binomial name
- Leioproctus sexmaculatus (Cockerell, 1914)

Synonyms
- Paracolletes sexmaculatus Cockerell, 1914

Species of bee

Leioproctus sexmaculatus, or Leioproctus (Leioproctus) sexmaculatus, is a species of bee in the family Colletidae and subfamily Colletinae. It is endemic to Australia. It was described by British-American entomologist Theodore Dru Alison Cockerell in 1914.

== Description ==
Female body length is 13–14 mm, male 11–12 mm. Colouration is mainly black, the abdomen dark bluish-green, with white hair.

== Distribution and habitat ==
The species occurs in south-west Western Australia. The type locality is Yallingup.

== Behaviour ==
The adults are flying mellivores.
