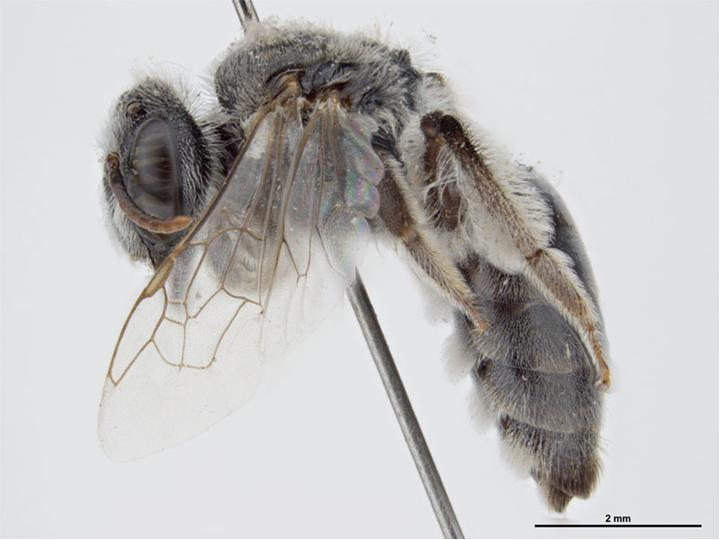
- Female

Scientific classification
- Kingdom: Animalia
- Phylum: Arthropoda
- Clade: Pancrustacea
- Class: Insecta
- Order: Hymenoptera
- Family: Colletidae
- Genus: Leioproctus
- Species: L. perminutus

Binomial name
- Leioproctus perminutus (Cockerell, 1929)

Synonyms
- Lamprocolletes minutus Friese, 1924; Paracolletes perminutus Cockerell, 1929

= Leioproctus perminutus =

Species of bee

Leioproctus perminutus, or Leioproctus (Fragocolletes) perminutus, is a species of bee in the family Colletidae and subfamily Colletinae. It is endemic to Australia. It was described by British-American entomologist Theodore Dru Alison Cockerell in 1929.

== Distribution and habitat ==
The species occurs in Western Australia. Type localities include Fremantle.

== Behaviour ==
The adults are flying mellivores. Flowering plants visited by the bees include Acacia species.
