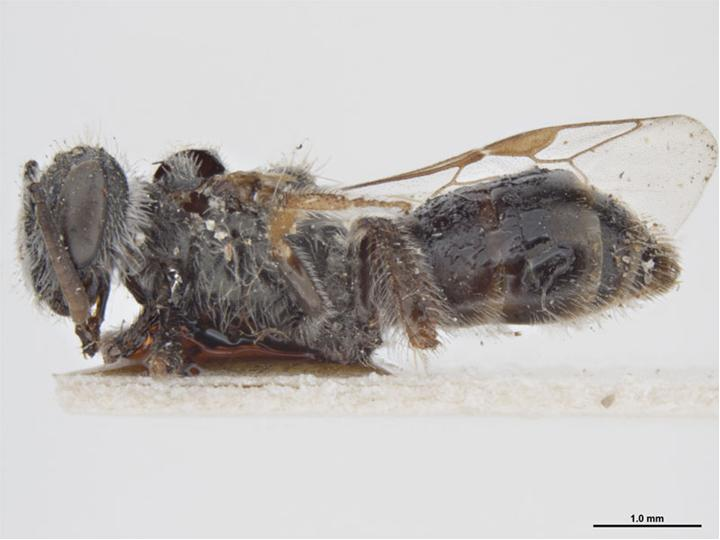
- Female

Scientific classification
- Kingdom: Animalia
- Phylum: Arthropoda
- Clade: Pancrustacea
- Class: Insecta
- Order: Hymenoptera
- Family: Colletidae
- Genus: Leioproctus
- Species: L. singularis

Binomial name
- Leioproctus singularis (Rayment, 1935)

Synonyms
- Paracolletes (Lysicolletes) singularis Rayment, 1935

= Leioproctus singularis =

Species of bee

Leioproctus singularis, or Leioproctus (Euryglossidia) singularis, is a species of bee in the family Colletidae and subfamily Colletinae. It is endemic to Australia. It was described by Australian entomologist Tarlton Rayment in 1935.

== Description ==
Body length is about 6 mm for both females and males. Integumental colouration is mainly dark green, with a darker abdomen; the hair is mostly white.

== Distribution and habitat ==
The species occurs in Western Australia. The type locality is Merredin.

== Behaviour ==
The adults are flying mellivores.

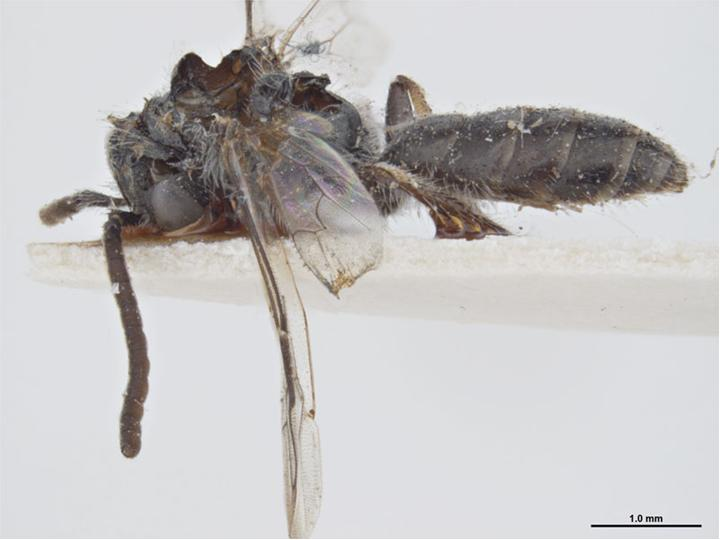
Male
