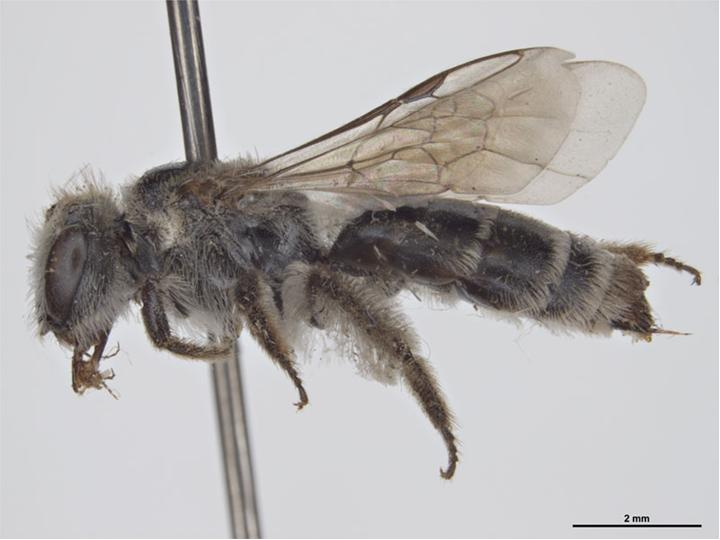
- Female

Scientific classification
- Kingdom: Animalia
- Phylum: Arthropoda
- Clade: Pancrustacea
- Class: Insecta
- Order: Hymenoptera
- Family: Colletidae
- Genus: Leioproctus
- Species: L. subminutus

Binomial name
- Leioproctus subminutus (Rayment, 1934)

Synonyms
- Paracolletes subminutus Rayment, 1934

= Leioproctus subminutus =

Species of bee

Leioproctus subminutus, or Leioproctus (Leioproctus) subminutus, is a species of bee in the family Colletidae and subfamily Colletinae. It is endemic to Australia. It was described by Australian entomologist Tarlton Rayment in 1934.

== Description ==
Female body length is about 9 mm. Integumental colouration is mainly black, the hair white to reddish-gold.

== Distribution and habitat ==
The species occurs in south-west Western Australia. The type locality is Swan River. It has also been recorded from Rottnest Island.

== Behaviour ==
The adults are flying mellivores.
