= Leioproctus sigillatus =

Scientific classification
- Kingdom: Animalia
- Phylum: Arthropoda
- Clade: Pancrustacea
- Class: Insecta
- Order: Hymenoptera
- Family: Colletidae
- Genus: Leioproctus
- Species: L. sigillatus

Binomial name
- Leioproctus sigillatus (Cockerell, 1914)

Synonyms
- Paracolletes sigillatus Cockerell, 1914

Species of bee

Leioproctus sigillatus, or Leioproctus (Leioproctus) sigillatus, is a species of bee in the family Colletidae and subfamily Colletinae. It is endemic to Australia. It was described by British-American entomologist Theodore Dru Alison Cockerell in 1914.

== Description ==
Female body length is 10 mm. Colouration is mainly black with some red markings, with pale ochreous hair.

== Distribution and habitat ==
The species occurs in South Australia. The exact type locality is unknown.

== Behaviour ==
The adults are flying mellivores.
