= Leioproctus phanerodontus =

Scientific classification
- Kingdom: Animalia
- Phylum: Arthropoda
- Clade: Pancrustacea
- Class: Insecta
- Order: Hymenoptera
- Family: Colletidae
- Genus: Leioproctus
- Species: L. phanerodontus

Binomial name
- Leioproctus phanerodontus (Cockerell, 1929)

Synonyms
- Paracolletes phanerodontus Cockerell, 1929

Species of bee

Leioproctus phanerodontus, or Leioproctus (Hadrocolletes) phanerodontus, is a species of bee in the family Colletidae and subfamily Colletinae. It is endemic to Australia. It was described by British-American entomologist Theodore Dru Alison Cockerell in 1929.

== Description ==
Female body length is 14.3 mm. Colouration is mainly black; the abdomen shining steel-blue; the hair white and black.

== Distribution and habitat ==
The species occurs in south-west Western Australia. The type locality is King George Sound.

== Behaviour ==
The adults are flying mellivores.
