= Leioproctus alienus =

Scientific classification
- Kingdom: Animalia
- Phylum: Arthropoda
- Clade: Pancrustacea
- Class: Insecta
- Order: Hymenoptera
- Family: Colletidae
- Genus: Leioproctus
- Species: L. alienus

Binomial name
- Leioproctus alienus (Smith, 1853)

Synonyms
- Andrena aliena Smith, 1853

Species of bee

Leioproctus aurifrons, or Leioproctus (Leioproctus) aurifrons, is a species of bee in the family Colletidae and subfamily Colletinae. It is endemic to Australia. It was described by English entomologist Frederick Smith in 1853.

== Distribution and habitat ==
The range of the species in Australia, as well as the exact type locality, are unknown.

== Behaviour ==
The adults are flying mellivores.
