= Leioproctus macalpinei =

Scientific classification
- Kingdom: Animalia
- Phylum: Arthropoda
- Clade: Pancrustacea
- Class: Insecta
- Order: Hymenoptera
- Family: Colletidae
- Genus: Leioproctus
- Species: L. macalpinei

Binomial name
- Leioproctus macalpinei Batley, 2025

Species of bee

Leioproctus macalpinei, or Leioproctus (Euryglossidia) macalpinei, is a species of bee in the family Colletidae and subfamily Colletinae. It is endemic to Australia. It was described by entomologist Michael Batley in 2025.

== Etymology ==
The specific epithet macalpinei honours Australian entomologist David Kendray McAlpine.

== Description ==
The female body length is 8 mm, male body length 7.5 mm. Integumental colouration is mainly black. The hair is white to brown.

== Distribution and habitat ==
The species occurs in eastern New South Wales. The type locality is 4 km north-east of Doyles Creek in the upper Hunter Valley.

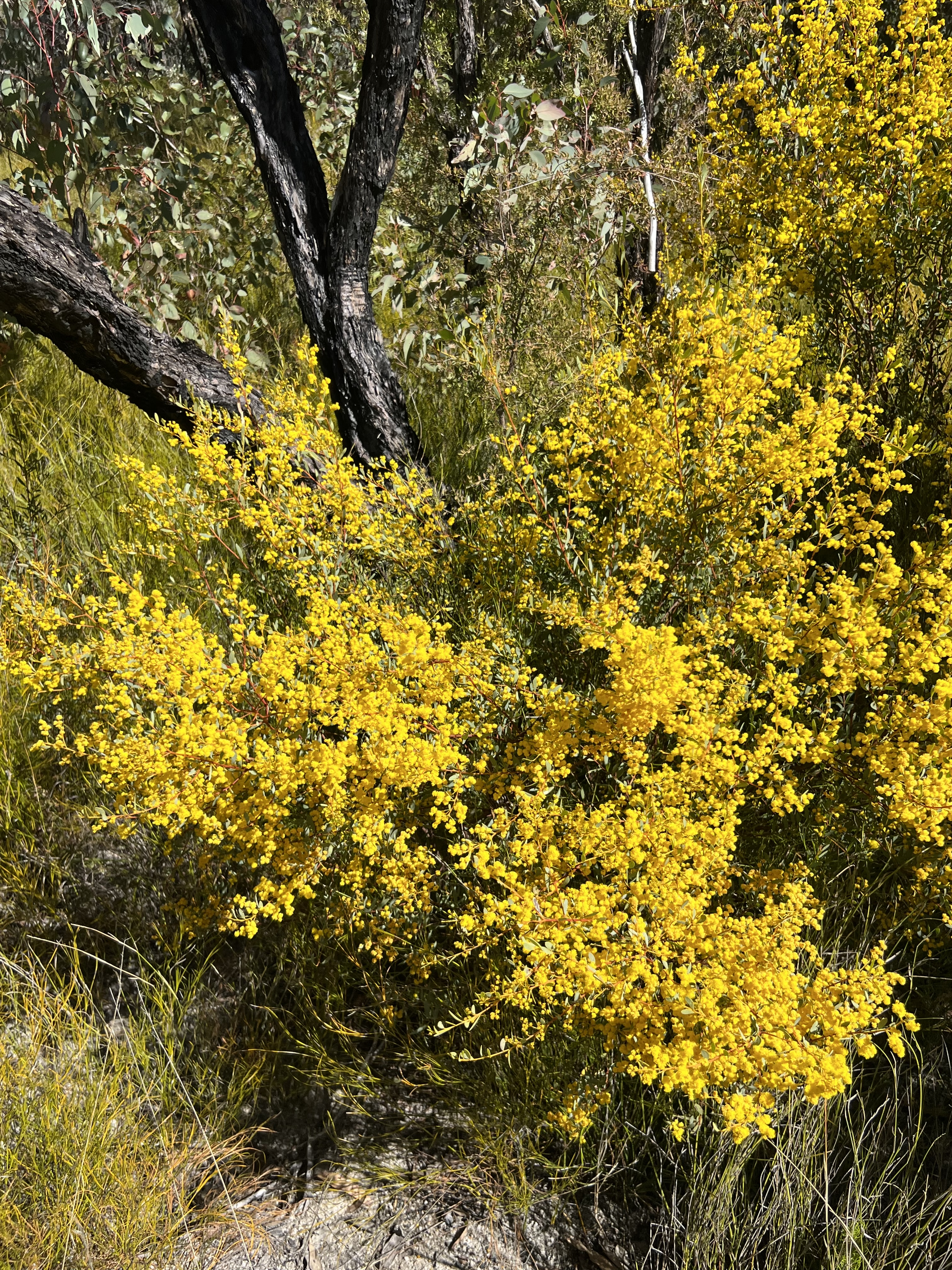
Acacia buxifolia (box-leaf wattle), a forage plant of the bees

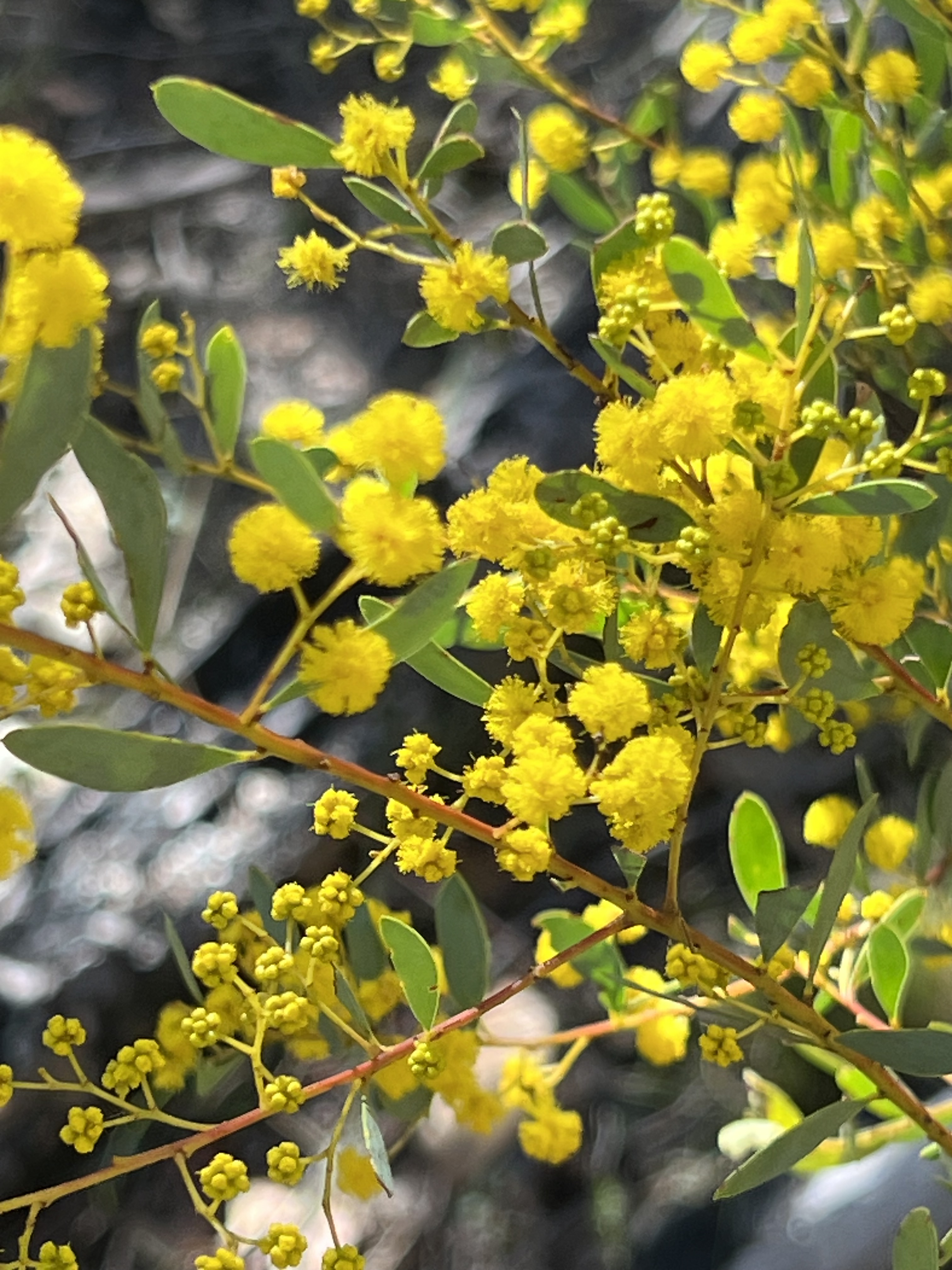
Flowers of Acacia buxifolia

== Behaviour ==
The adults are flying mellivores. Flowering plants visited by the bees include Acacia buxifolia.
