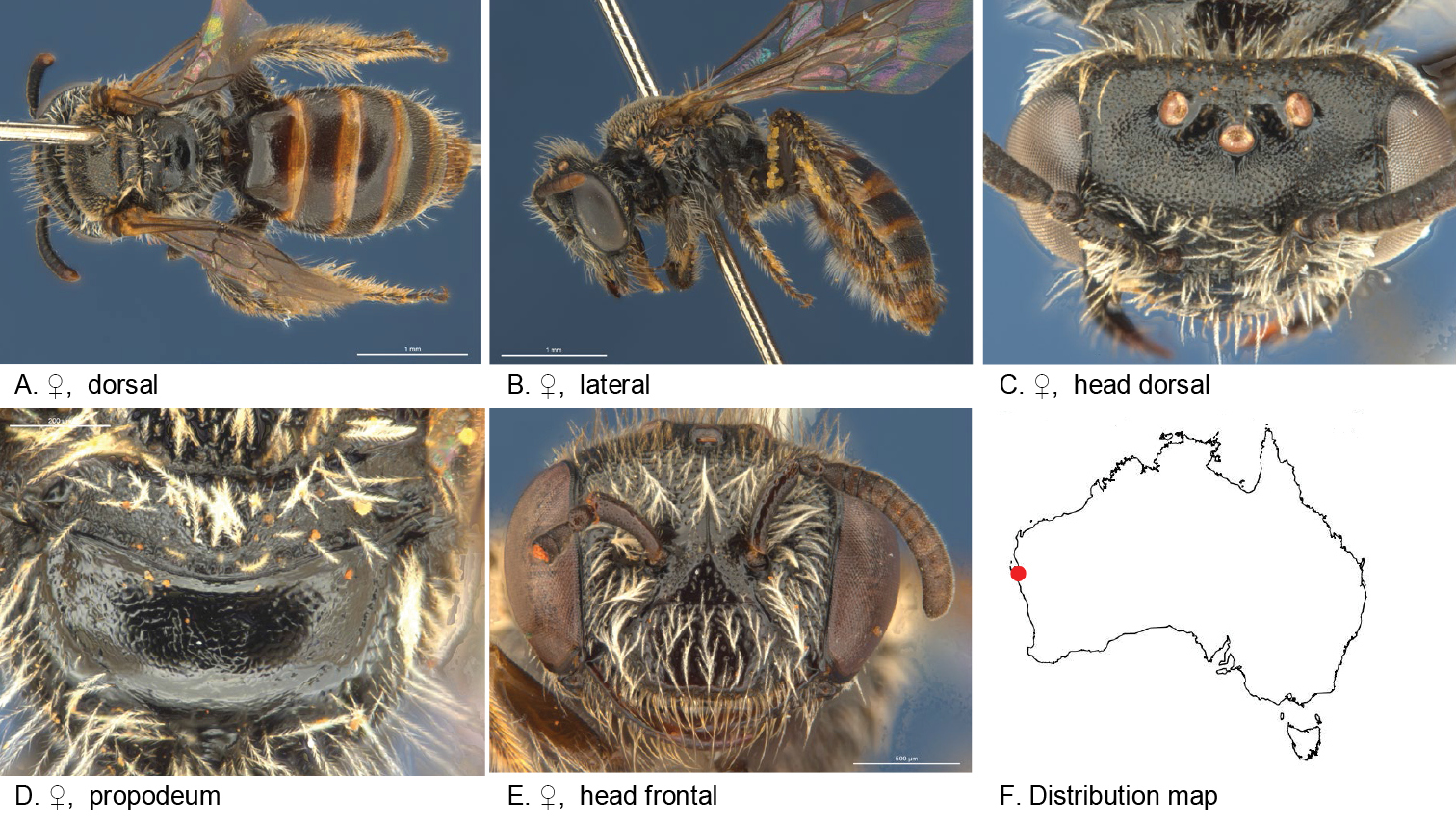
- Female holotype

Scientific classification
- Kingdom: Animalia
- Phylum: Arthropoda
- Clade: Pancrustacea
- Class: Insecta
- Order: Hymenoptera
- Family: Colletidae
- Genus: Leioproctus
- Species: L. splendens

Binomial name
- Leioproctus splendens Leijs 2018

= Leioproctus splendens =

Species of bee

Leioproctus similis, or Leioproctus (Colletellus) similis, is a species of bee in the family Colletidae and subfamily Colletinae. It is endemic to Australia. It was described by entomologist Remko Leijs in 2018.

== Etymology ==
The specific epithet splendens refers to the smooth and shiny integument on the metapostnotum and terga.

== Description ==
The female holotype body length is 4.5 mm, head width 1.5 mm. Integumental colouration is mainly black, brown and orange. The hair is brown.

== Distribution and habitat ==
The species occurs in Western Australia. The type locality is 14 km south-east of Tamala Station, Shark Bay.

== Behaviour ==
The adults are flying mellivores. Flowering plants visited by the bees include Calandrinia species.
