= Leioproctus mastersi =

Scientific classification
- Kingdom: Animalia
- Phylum: Arthropoda
- Clade: Pancrustacea
- Class: Insecta
- Order: Hymenoptera
- Family: Colletidae
- Genus: Leioproctus
- Species: L. mastersi

Binomial name
- Leioproctus mastersi (Cockerell, 1929)

Synonyms
- Euryglossidia mastersi Cockerell, 1929

Species of bee

Leioproctus mastersi, or Leioproctus (Euryglossidia) mastersi, is a species of bee in the family Colletidae and subfamily Colletinae. It is endemic to Australia. It was described by British-American entomologist Theodore Dru Alison Cockerell in 1929.

== Description ==
Female body length is about 9 mm. Colouration is mainly black; the abdomen chestnut-red with a purple lustre; the hair pale to grey-brown.

== Distribution and habitat ==
The species occurs in south-west Western Australia. The type locality is King George Sound.

== Behaviour ==
The adults are flying mellivores.
