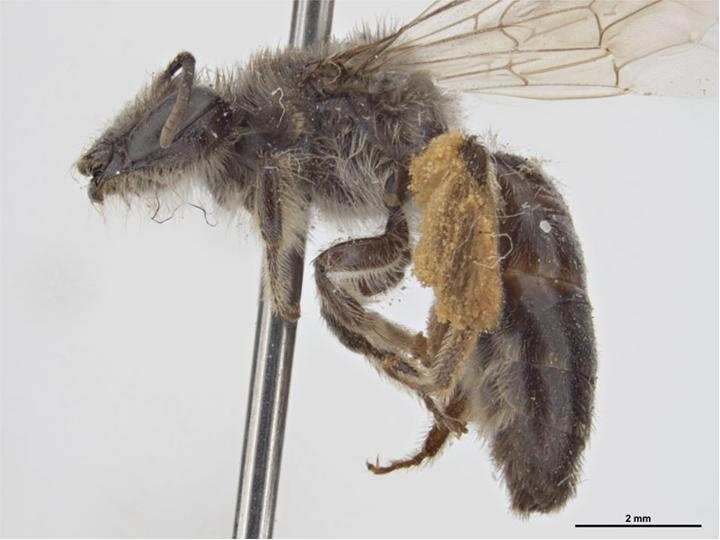
- Female

Scientific classification
- Kingdom: Animalia
- Phylum: Arthropoda
- Clade: Pancrustacea
- Class: Insecta
- Order: Hymenoptera
- Family: Colletidae
- Genus: Leioproctus
- Species: L. confusus

Binomial name
- Leioproctus confusus Cockerell, 1904

= Leioproctus confusus =

Species of bee

Leioproctus confusus, or Leioproctus (Leioproctus) confusus, is a species of bee in the family Colletidae and subfamily Colletinae. It was described by British-American entomologist Theodore Dru Alison Cockerell in 1904.

== Distribution and habitat ==
The species occurs in Australia. The exact type locality is unknown.

== Behaviour ==
The adults are flying mellivores.
