= Leioproctus nasutiformis =

Scientific classification
- Kingdom: Animalia
- Phylum: Arthropoda
- Clade: Pancrustacea
- Class: Insecta
- Order: Hymenoptera
- Family: Colletidae
- Genus: Leioproctus
- Species: L. nasutiformis

Binomial name
- Leioproctus nasutiformis Batley, 2025

Species of bee

Leioproctus nasutiformis, or Leioproctus (Euryglossidia) nasutiformis, is a species of bee in the family Colletidae and subfamily Colletinae. It is endemic to Australia. It was described by entomologist Michael Batley in 2025.

== Etymology ==
The specific epithet nasutiformis (Latin: "in the form of a snout") is an anatomical reference to the prominent clypeus.

== Description ==
The female body length is 8 mm. Integumental colouration is mainly black, with weak iridescence and brown markings. The hair is white to brown.

== Distribution and habitat ==
The species occurs in the south of Western Australia. The type locality is 60 km north of Norseman in the Goldfields–Esperance region.

== Behaviour ==
The adults are flying mellivores. Flowering plants visited by the bees include Eremophila scoparia.

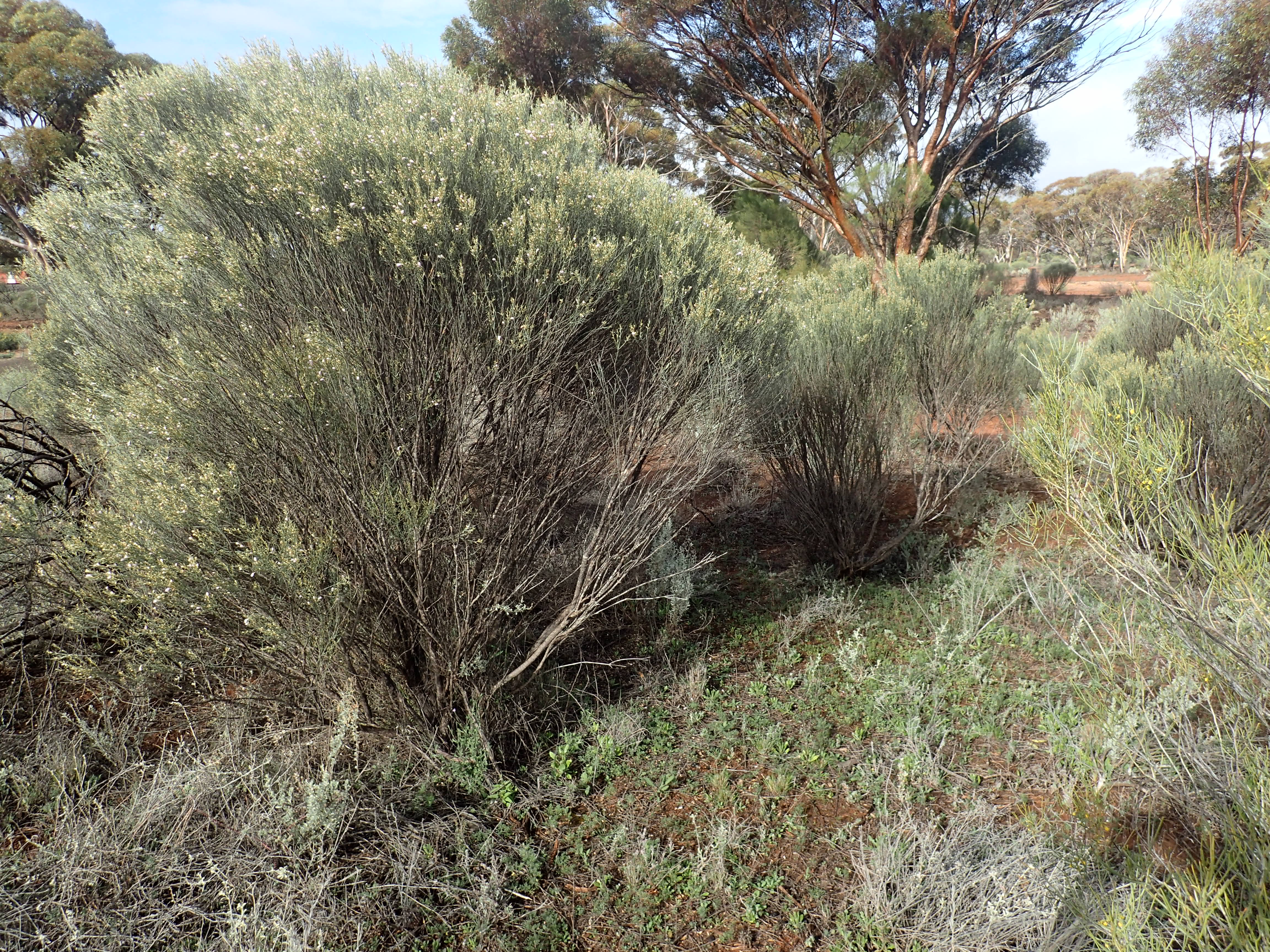
Eremophila scoparia (silver emubush), a forage plant of the bees

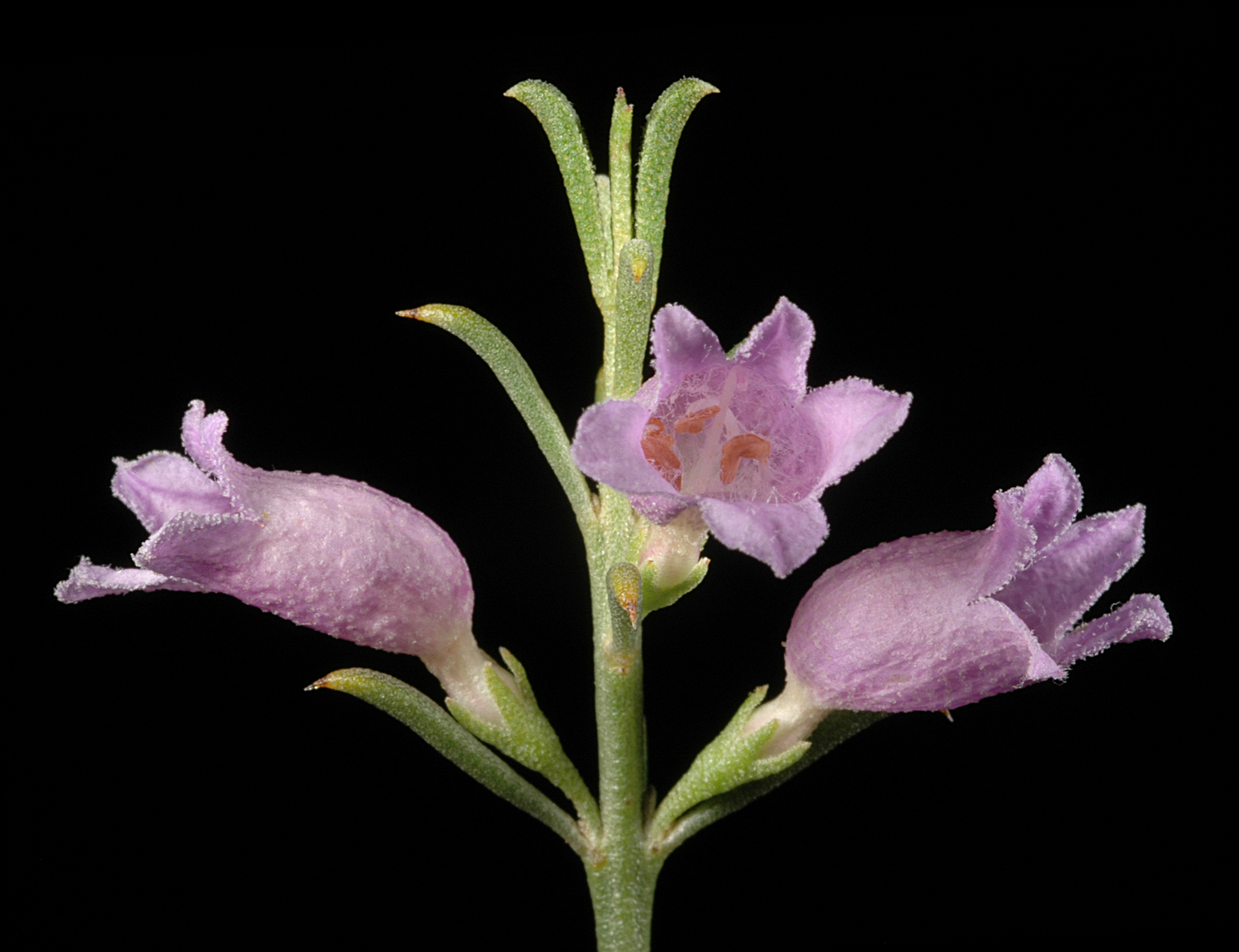
Flowers of Eremophila scoparia
