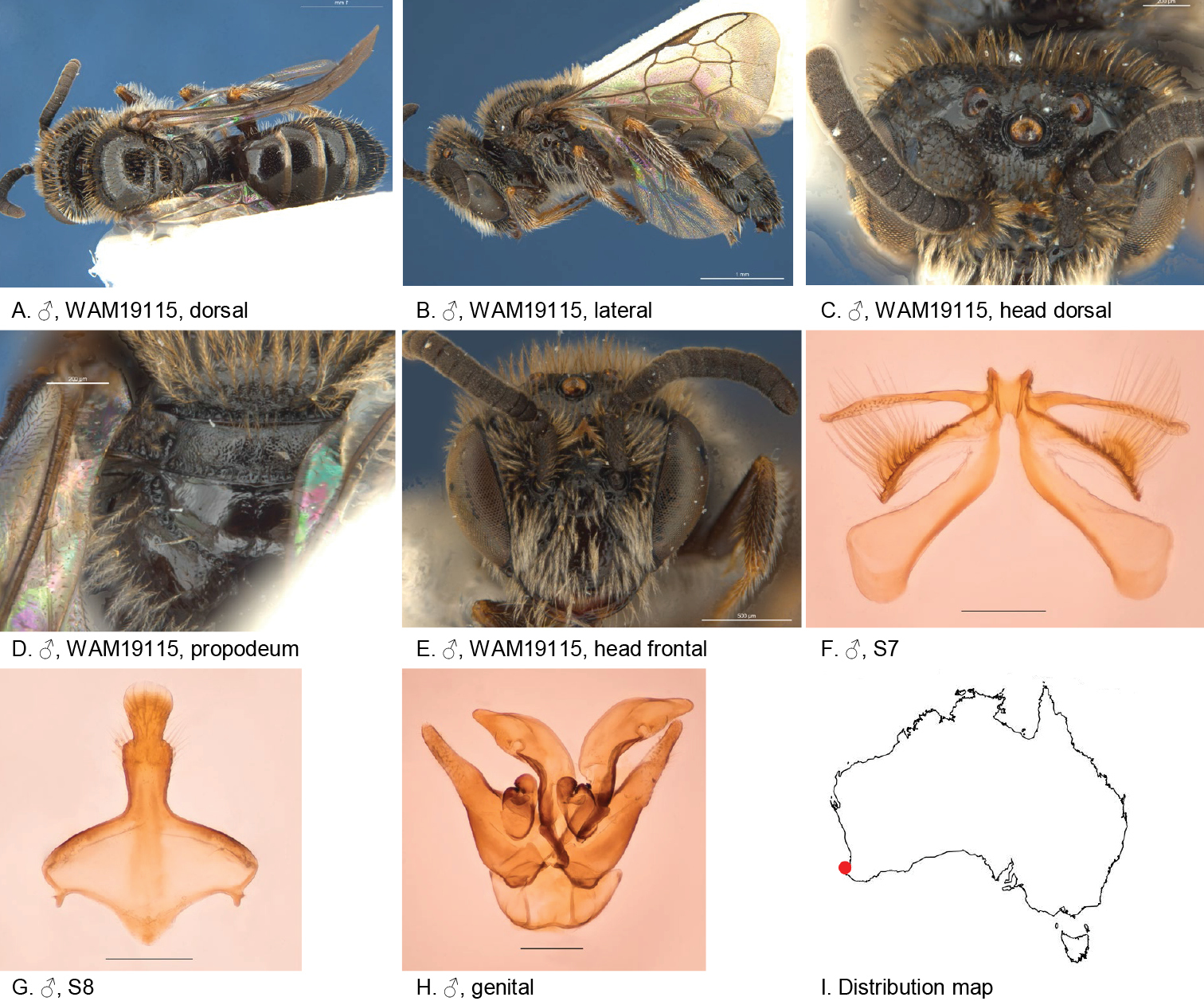
- Male holotype

Scientific classification
- Kingdom: Animalia
- Phylum: Arthropoda
- Clade: Pancrustacea
- Class: Insecta
- Order: Hymenoptera
- Family: Colletidae
- Genus: Leioproctus
- Species: L. quadripinnatus

Binomial name
- Leioproctus quadripinnatus Leijs 2018

= Leioproctus quadripinnatus =

Species of bee

Leioproctus quadripinnatus, or Leioproctus (Colletellus) quadripinnatus, is a species of bee in the family Colletidae and subfamily Colletinae. It is endemic to Australia. It was described by entomologist Remko Leijs in 2018.

== Etymology ==
The specific epithet quadripinnatus is an anatomical reference to the thin, feathery, apical lobes of the male sterna 7.

== Description ==
The male holotype body length is 4.5 mm, head width 1.5 mm. Integumental colouration is mainly black, orange and brown. The hair is light brown.

== Distribution and habitat ==
The species occurs in south-west Western Australia. The type locality is Eagle Bay.

== Behaviour ==
The adults are flying mellivores.
