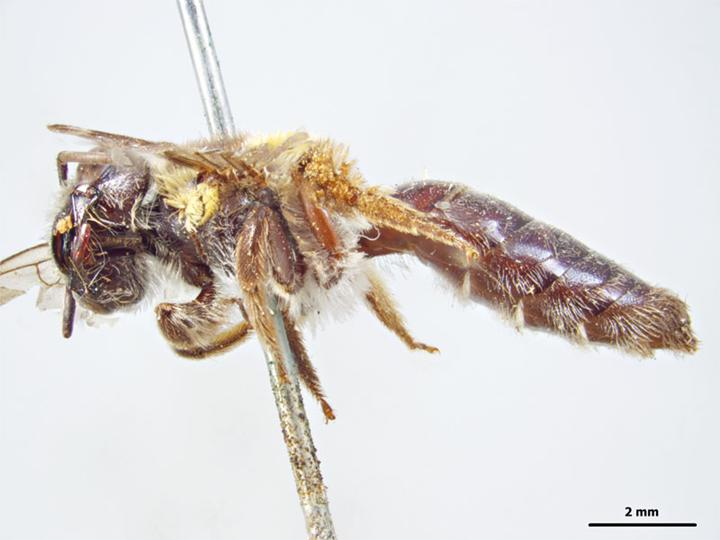
- Female

Scientific classification
- Kingdom: Animalia
- Phylum: Arthropoda
- Clade: Pancrustacea
- Class: Insecta
- Order: Hymenoptera
- Family: Colletidae
- Genus: Leioproctus
- Species: L. cristatus

Binomial name
- Leioproctus cristatus (Smith, 1853)

Synonyms
- Lamprocolletes cristatus Smith, 1853; Paracolletes cristatus (Smith, 1853); Leioproctus (Leioproctus) cristatus (Smith, 1853)

= Leioproctus cristatus =

Species of bee

Leioproctus cristatus, or Leioproctus (Exleycolletes) cristatus, is a species of bee in the family Colletidae and subfamily Colletinae. It is endemic to Australia. It was described by English entomologist Frederick Smith in 1853.

== Distribution and habitat ==
The species occurs in south-eastern Australia.

== Behaviour ==
The adults are solitary flying mellivores that nest gregariously in the ground. Flowering plants visited by the bees include Leptospermum and Melaleuca species.

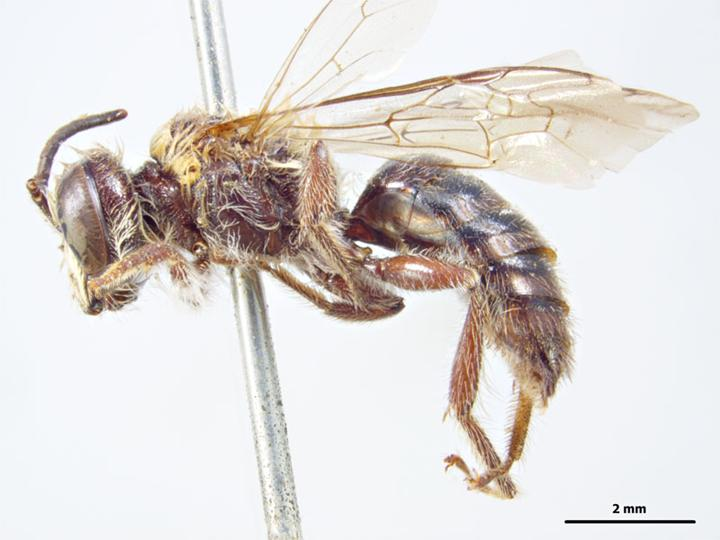
Male
