= Leioproctus philonesus =

Scientific classification
- Kingdom: Animalia
- Phylum: Arthropoda
- Clade: Pancrustacea
- Class: Insecta
- Order: Hymenoptera
- Family: Colletidae
- Genus: Leioproctus
- Species: L. philonesus

Binomial name
- Leioproctus philonesus (Cockerell, 1929)
- Location of Lord Howe Island

Synonyms
- Paracolletes philonesus Cockerell, 1929

Species of bee

Leioproctus philonesus, or Leioproctus (Leioproctus) philonesus, is a species of bee in the family Colletidae and subfamily Colletinae. It is endemic to Australia. It was described by British-American entomologist Theodore Dru Alison Cockerell in 1929.

== Description ==
Female body length is about 9.5 mm. Colouration is mainly black; the hair white to grey-black and reddish.

== Distribution and habitat ==
The species only occurs on Australia's Lord Howe Island in the Tasman Sea. The type locality is Mount Gower.

== Behaviour ==
The adults are flying mellivores.
