= Leioproctus pygmaeus =

Scientific classification
- Kingdom: Animalia
- Phylum: Arthropoda
- Clade: Pancrustacea
- Class: Insecta
- Order: Hymenoptera
- Family: Colletidae
- Genus: Leioproctus
- Species: L. pygmaeus

Binomial name
- Leioproctus pygmaeus Maynard 2013

Species of bee

Leioproctus pygmaeus, or Leioproctus (Minycolletes) pygmaeus, is a species of bee in the family Colletidae and subfamily Colletinae. It is endemic to Australia. It was described by Australian entomologist Glynn Maynard in 2013.

== Etymology ==
The specific epithet pygmaeus is Latin for "little" or "dwarf", with reference to the size of the bees.

== Description ==
Male body length is about 7 mm. Integumental colouration is black to dark brown, the legs paler. The hair is white.

== Distribution and habitat ==
The species occurs in Western Australia. The type locality is 7 km south-east of Newman in the Pilbara region.

== Behaviour ==
The adults are flying mellivores. Flowering plants visited by the bees include Acacia species.
