= International Union for the Study of Social Insects =

The International Union for the Study of Social Insects has at its purpose to promote and encourage the study of social insects and other social organisms in the broadest sense. Both research and the dissemination of knowledge about social insects and other social organisms through publications, educational programs, and activities are encouraged. The Union further pursues these objectives via the organization of Congresses and Symposia, publication of the journal Insectes Sociaux, and recognition of distinguished service with awards. National and regional sections play a key role in the IUSSI, with the sections organizing meetings, symposia, and newsletters.

The Union was founded in 1951 as a result of discussions at the International Entomological Congress in Amsterdam. Key figures in the establishment of the IUSSI were Pierre-Paul Grassé (France), T. C. Schneirla (U.S.A.), Carlo Jucci (Italy), K. Gösswald (Germany), D. R. Gonçalves (Brazil), and Tohru Uchida (Japan). Grassé took the lead in many matters in the early years of the IUSSI, including establishment of the Union's quarterly scientific journal, published since 1954, called Insectes Sociaux.

The Union was also originally referred to by its name in French, L'Union Internationale pour l'Étude des Insectes Sociaux, or UIEIS

Union Officers include a Secretary-General, who provides overall coordination and management of Union finances, the Editor of Insectes Sociaux, and the President. These offices are filled by recommendation of the international committee and vote of the general assembly at the Union's quadrennial International Congress. The President is the scientific organizer for the next International Congress and is a member of the section that will host the next Congress. It follows that the Union is organized into sections based on nationality or geographic region. Each section has its own activities, possibly including meetings and publications.

== Secretaries-General ==
Until the 1973 Congress in London, the IUSSI was led by a committee consisting of the Presidents of the sections. Under the leadership of Charles D. Michener and G. LeMasne, a new constitution was adopted at the London Congress and the position of Secretary-General was created. Philip Howse of the University of Southampton was elected the first Secretary-General.

- 2022–present Mark Brown
- 2014-2022 Madeleine Beekman
- 2006-2014 Joan Herbers
- 2002-2006 Wolfgang Kirchner
- 1994-2002 Michael Breed
- 1986-1994 Hayo Velthuis
- 1977-1986 Philip Howse

== Editors, Insectes Sociaux ==
- Madeleine Beekman 2022–present
- Miriam Richards 2018-2022
- Michael Breed 2014-2018
- Johan Billen 1991-2014
- Pierre Jaisson 1982-1990
- Hubert Montagner 1973-1982
- Jacques Lecomte 1963-1972
- G. Richard 1954-1962

== Sections ==
- African Section
- Australian Section
- Bolivarian Section (Spanish speaking Latin America)
- Brazilian Section
- Central European Section (former German Section)
- French Section
- Indian Section
- Italian Section
- Japanese Section
- North American Section
- Northwest European Section (former British Section)
- Russian-speaking Section

== Congresses ==
- XIX Congress of the IUSSI, 03.07 - 07.07, 2022, San Diego, California, United States

President: Jennifer Fewell, Arizona State University

- XVIII Congress of the IUSSI, 2018, Guarujá, state of São Paulo, Brazil

President: Klaus Hartfelder, University of São Paulo

- XVII Congress of the IUSSI, 13.07 - 18.07, 2014, Cairns, Australia, 2014 Congress site

President: Benjamin Oldroyd, University of Sydney

Proceedings: http://www.iussi2014.com/downloads/IUSSI2014_Abstract_Book.pdf

- XVI International Congress of the IUSSI, 08.08 - 14.08, 2010, Copenhagen, Denmark, 2010 Congress site

President: Jacobus Boomsma, University of Denmark, Copenhagen

Proceedings: http://www.iussi.org/IUSSI2010/Media/IUSSI2010AbstractBook.pdf ISBN 978 87 92100 00 9

- XV Congress of the IUSSI, 30.07 - 04.08, 2006, Washington, D.C., United States

President: Walter Tschinkel, Florida State University

- XIV Congress of the IUSSI, 27.07 - 03.08, 2002, Sapporo, Japan

President: Tadao Matsumoto

Proceedings: Kikuchi, T. N., N. Azuma and S. Higashi, eds. 2003. Genes, Behaviors and Evolution of Social Insects (314 pp). Hokkaido University Press ISBN： 978-4-8329-0317-3

- XIII Congress of the IUSSI, 29.12.98 - 04.01.99, 1998, Adelaide, Australia

President: Ross Crozier

- XII Congress of the IUSSI, 21.08 - 27.08, 1994, Paris, France

President: Pierre Jaisson, University of Paris XIII, Villetaneuse

Proceedings: Lenoir, Alain, Gérard Arnold & Michel Lepage, eds. Les insectes sociaux : UIEIS 94 : 12ème congrès de l'Union internationale pour l'étude des insectes sociaux, Paris, Sorbonne, 21-27 août 1994 = IUSSI 94 : 12th congress of the International union for the study of social insects / Villetaneuse : Publications Université Paris Nord, 1994. xxiv, 583 p.; 22 cm. ISBN 2867070112

- XI Congress of the IUSSI, 05.08 - 11.08, 1990, Bangalore, India

President: G. K. Veeresh

Proceedings: Veeresh, G. K., B. Mallik, and C. A. Viraktamath. 1991. Social Insects and the Environment: Proceedings of the 11th International Congress of Iussi, 1990 (International Union for the Study of Social Insects) Brill Academic Pub ISBN 9004093168

- X Congress of the IUSSI, 18.08 - 22.08, 1986, Munich, Germany President: Heinz Rembold

Proceedings: Eder, Jörg and Heinz Rembold, eds. 1987. Chemistry and biology of social insects: proceedings of the 10th International Congress, München, August 18–22, 1986, IUSSI (International Union for the Study of Social Insects) Munchen : Peperny, 1987. ISBN 3925995013

- IX Congress of the IUSSI, 1982, Boulder, Colorado, [United States President: Professor Charles D. Michener, University of Kansas

Proceedings: Breed, M.D., Michener, C.D., Evans, H.E., eds. 1982. The biology of social insects: Proceedings of the 9th Congress of the IUSSI. Westview Press: Boulder. 419 + xii pp. ISBN 0865312915

- VIII Congress of the IUSSI, 05.09 - 11.09, 1977, Wageningen, Netherlands

President: J. de Wilde

Proceedings: Velthuis, H.H.W. and J.T.Wiebes 1977. Proceedings of the Eighth International Congress of the International Union for the Study of Social Insects, Wageningen, the Netherlands, September 5–10, 1977. Wageningen : Centre for Agricultural Publishing and Documentation, ISBN 9022006409

- VII Congress of the IUSSI, 10.09 - 15.09, 1973, London, United Kingdom

President: C. G. Butler

Proceedings: Proceedings of the International Union for the Study of Social Insects VIIth International Congress, London, 10–15 September 1973. c/o Dr P.E. Howse, Department of Zoology, The University, Highfield, Southampton SO9 5NH, 1973. vi, 418 p.

- VI Congress of the IUSSI, 15.09 - 20.09, 1969, Bern, Switzerland

President: Martin Lüscher Honorary President: Professor P. P. Grassé

Proceedings: Proceedings of the VI Congress, Bern, 15–20 September 1969. Bern, Zoological Institute, University of Bern, 1969 309 p.

- V Congress of the IUSSI, 05.07 - 10.07, 1965, Toulouse, France

President: Jacques LeComte, Station de Recherches sur l'Abeille et les Insectes Sociaux, Bures-Sur-Yvette

- IV Congress of the IUSSI (IV Congresso dell'UIES), 09.09 - 14.09, 1961, Pavia, Italy

President: Carlo Jucci

- III Congress of the IUSSI (III Congres De L'Union), 09.07 - 13.07, 1957, Paris, France

President: P. P. Grassé

- II Congress of the IUSSI (II Internationalen Kongresses), 03.04-06.04, 1955, Würzburg, Germany

President: K. Gösswald

- I Congress of the IUSSI, 1952, Paris, France
- Foundation of the IUSSI, 1951, Amsterdam, Netherlands

Special IUSSI symposium: Noirot Ch., P.E. Howse, G. Le Masne., eds. 1975. Pheromones and defensive secretions in social insects : the proceedings of a symposium [of the International Union for the Study of Social Insects], held on 18, 19 and 20 September 1975, at the University of Dijon / Dijon: French Section of the I.U.S.S.I., 1975. vii, 248 p. : ill.; 21 cm. ISBN 2901062016

== See also ==
- Apiology
- Eusociality
- Myrmecology
