= Carl Rettenmeyer =

American biologist

- Born: February 10, 1931; Meriden, Connecticut
- Died: April 9, 2009 (aged 78)
- Education: Swarthmore College, University of Kansas
- Spouse: Marian Rettenmeyer
- Scientific career
- Fields: Army ant biology
- Doctoral advisor: Charles Duncan Michener

Carl W. Rettenmeyer (February 10, 1931 – April 9, 2009) was an American biologist who specialised in army ants. He was born in Meriden, Connecticut, and later attended Swarthmore College in Pennsylvania. He first became interested in army ants when he visited Panama as an undergraduate and then returned there as a postgraduate. Although he studied many aspects of army ant biology, he particularly focused on the animals associated with the ants and especially mites which live on the ants. He was well known for his photography of army ants, with his photographs appearing in over 100 publications, and he used his video footage to create two DVDs. He taught at the University of Kansas from 1960 until 1971 and then at the University of Connecticut until his retirement in 1996, after being diagnosed with Waldenstrom’s macroglobulinemia. After his death in 2009, a set of papers on army ants were published in Insectes Sociaux in memory of his work.

== Personal life ==
Rettenmeyer was born in Meriden, Connecticut, to his parents Frederick and Gertrude; he had one sister. He first met his wife Marian at a summer school at the University of New Hampshire in 1951 and married her in 1955. She had been interested in insects from an early age and Rettenmeyer "knew she was a woman I had to keep track of"; she would become his lifelong assistant. Together they had a son and a daughter.

In 1996 he was diagnosed with Waldenstrom’s macroglobulinemia, a form of lymphoma and expected to die within a few years. Although he retired the same year, a new drug developed soon after his diagnosis kept the disease in check, allowing him to continue to work, despite often having to use a wheelchair due to his frailty. He continued to correspond with other army ant researchers with enthusiasm after retiring.

== Education ==
Rettenmeyer attended Swarthmore College as an undergraduate, majoring in Biology and graduated in 1953. Whilst in his junior year he was contacted by Theodore Schneirla, an acquaintance of his professor. Schneirla was studying the behaviour of army ants and needed an assistant to work for six months on Barro Colorado Island (BCI) in Panama, which Rettenmeyer accepted. Schneirla was interested in army ants behaviour as he thought that by studying it he could understand how it would be possible for humans to fight wars more effectively. They spent many nights observing army ant trails and it was at this time that Rettenmeyer first noticed that other animals lived on the ants. a subject that continued to fascinate him throughout his life.

After graduating he studied a PhD in entomology at the University of Kansas under the supervision of Charles Duncan Michener, which he completed in 1962. During his PhD Life magazine approached him asking him to accompany a photographer to BCI to photograph army ants. Rettenmeyer says that this was his "lucky break" and during nine weeks spent on BCI he collected thousands of specimens, including 147 species of mite found living on the ants. Upon his return to Kansas he was encouraged by faculty members to apply for funding so he could return to study army ants in the rainforest. Through his career he went on over 20 expeditions to Panama, Ecuador and Costa Rica.

== Research ==
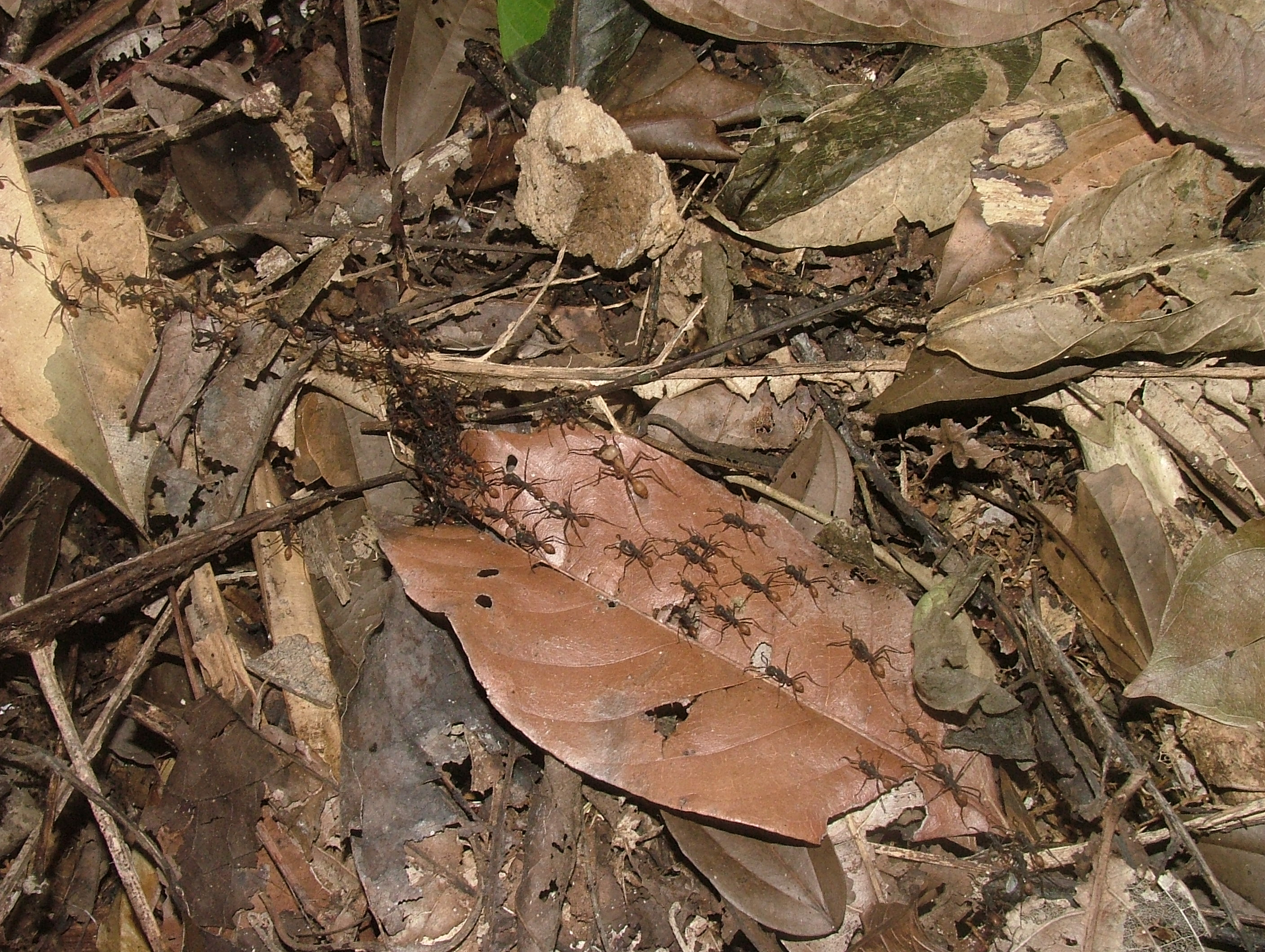
A trail of the army ant Eciton burchellii which Rettenmeyer studied

Rettenmeyer studied a broad range of topics related to army ants, publishing on general army ant biology, chemical communication and foraging behaviour. His work also inspired other researchers to investigate such diverse areas as avian ecology, social insect symbioses, tropical phenology and conservation biology. He presented at many conferences and published over 50 papers during his career.

In 1963, Rettenmeyer rediscovered the army ant Neivamyrmex sumichrasti, which was first scientifically described by François Sumichrast in the 1860s but then not studied further. In 2003, he helped another expedition find the species again, and also tried to find a species of beetle associated with it. However, Ecitosius robustus, the robust army ant beetle, is almost impossible to distinguish physically from the host ant, and Rettenmeyer was unable to find it among the samples collected.

He was one of the first biologists to visit Monteverde Cloud Forest Reserve in Costa Rica, which is now a major center for Neotropical research.

In 1975 he reported in Science the first recorded case of mass recruitment in army ants. He found that when worker ants encountered a food source that was too large for them to kill or carry themselves, they can communicate with other workers via chemical and physical signals to recruit them to assist.

Working with his wife, Rettenmeyer identified 557 species of animals associated with Eciton burchellii, the greatest number of animals known to associate with any single animal species. Although many of the associations are likely to be opportunistic, over 300 species are thought to be reliant on the ant to survive. As well as these species, Rettenmeyer collected many thousands of specimens that have not been identified. He spent his later years examining samples from 1,600 army ant colonies he had collected and in total found 45,000 mites. Of these mites, only 3% have been studied and whilst doing so, three new mite families were identified as well as over 100 new species. Those identified often have inconceivably strange lifestyles. One species (Macrocheles rettenmeyeri) only lives on the feet of one particular species of ant (Eciton dulcius) acting like an extension to the foot, whilst sucking the blood of the ant. This was regarded by E. O. Wilson and Bert Hölldobler in Journey to the Ants as the most extraordinary parasitic adaptation among ant parasites. Another mite only lives on the eye of another species and Rettenmeyerius carli lives on the base of worker's mandibles. As of 2010 scientists were continuing to study the specimens Rettenmeyer collected during his life and one researcher told the BBC that she expected that the number of associated species could potentially double once the work is completed.

After his death a set of papers on army ants were published in Insectes Sociaux in memory of his work. In 2016, a grant was awarded to create an online database of the Rettenmeyer's collection of over two million specimens.

== Photography ==
Rettenmeyer was known for his ability to photograph previously unseen aspects of army ant behaviour and his photographs appeared in National Geographic, the Audubon Encyclopedia of Wildlife, National Wildlife Federation, and Smithsonian magazine. Among his accomplishments was photographing army ants mating for the first time, as well as estimating the longevity of the queen by recapturing a specimen. Overall his photographs appeared in over 100 publications.

In 2006 he published a self-produced DVD titled Astonishing Army Ants using footage that he had collected over 35 years. It was reviewed as being extremely information rich and a "must-see for ant enthusiasts" but so full of facts it is exhausting to watch. In January 2009 he was still working on another DVD titled The World’s Largest Animal Association documenting the hundreds of animals he found associated with E. burchellii.

== Teaching ==
From 1960, during the later years of his PhD he began to teach at the University of Kansas, until he moved to the University of Connecticut in 1971. There he taught biology, social insects and photography for biologists. As well as this he was responsible for resurrecting the Connecticut State Museum of Natural History which he was the founding director of. Although the origins of a natural history museum at the University of Connecticut existed as early as 1881, Rettenmeyer was the force behind establishing a proper museum to house the university's specimens which opened in 1985. He continued as the director until his retirement.
