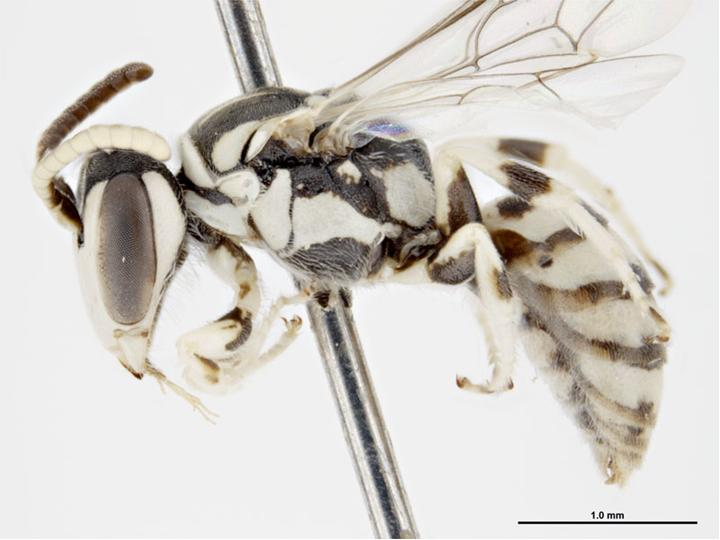
- Female

Scientific classification
- Kingdom: Animalia
- Phylum: Arthropoda
- Clade: Pancrustacea
- Class: Insecta
- Order: Hymenoptera
- Family: Colletidae
- Genus: Hylaeus
- Species: H. albozebratus

Binomial name
- Hylaeus albozebratus Michener, 1965

= Hylaeus albozebratus =

Species of bee

Hylaeus albozebratus, or Hylaeus (Prosopisteron) albozebratus, is a species of bee in the family Colletidae and subfamily Hylaeinae. It is endemic to Australia. It was described by American entomologist Charles Duncan Michener in 1965.

== Etymology ==
The specific epithet albozebratus refers to the colour pattern of white stripes on all parts of the body.

== Description ==
Male body length is 3.8 mm, wing length 3 mm. Integumental colouration is black with white stripes.

== Distribution and habitat ==
The species occurs in Western Australia. The type locality is Carnarvon, in the Gascoyne region.

== Behaviour ==
The adults are flying mellivores.

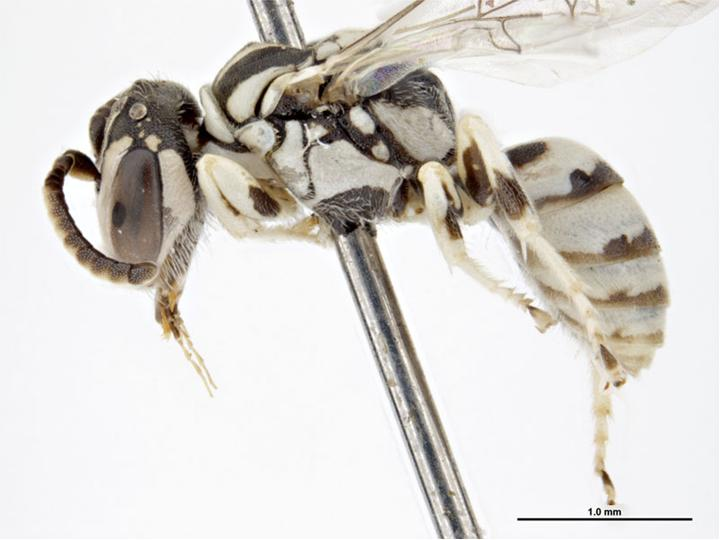
Male
