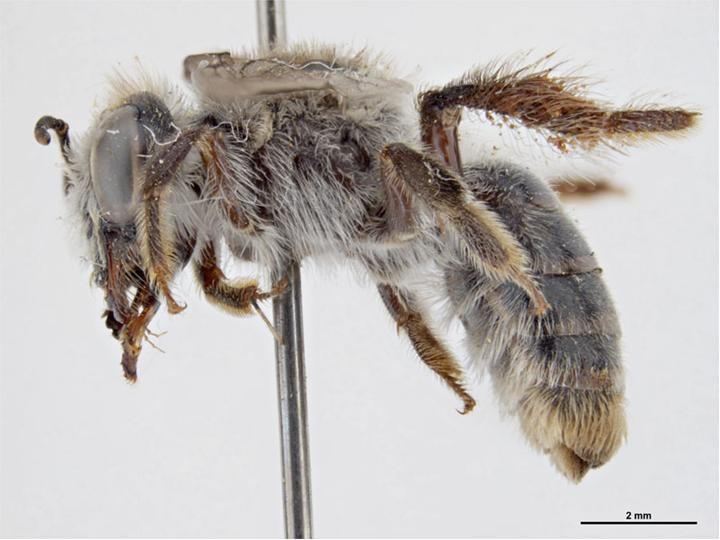
- Female

Scientific classification
- Kingdom: Animalia
- Phylum: Arthropoda
- Clade: Pancrustacea
- Class: Insecta
- Order: Hymenoptera
- Family: Colletidae
- Genus: Leioproctus
- Species: L. crenulatus

Binomial name
- Leioproctus crenulatus Michener, 1965

= Leioproctus crenulatus =

Species of bee

Leioproctus crenulatus, or Leioproctus (Leioproctus) crenulatus, is a species of bee in the family Colletidae and subfamily Colletinae. It is endemic to Australia. It was described by American entomologist Charles Duncan Michener in 1965.

== Etymology ==
The specific epithet crenulatus is an anatomical reference to the "crenulate flagellum" (scalloped antenna).

== Description ==
Male body length 11 mm, forewing length 7 mm. Integumental colouration mainly black and brown, hair white through yellowish to brown.

== Distribution and habitat ==
The species occurs in eastern Australia. The type locality is Wallangarra, Queensland.

== Behaviour ==
The adults are flying mellivores. Flowering plants visited by the bees include Pultenaea species.

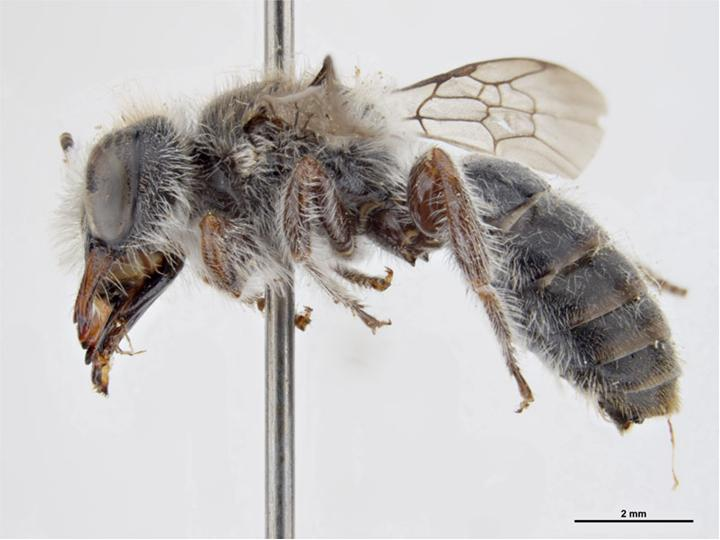
Male
