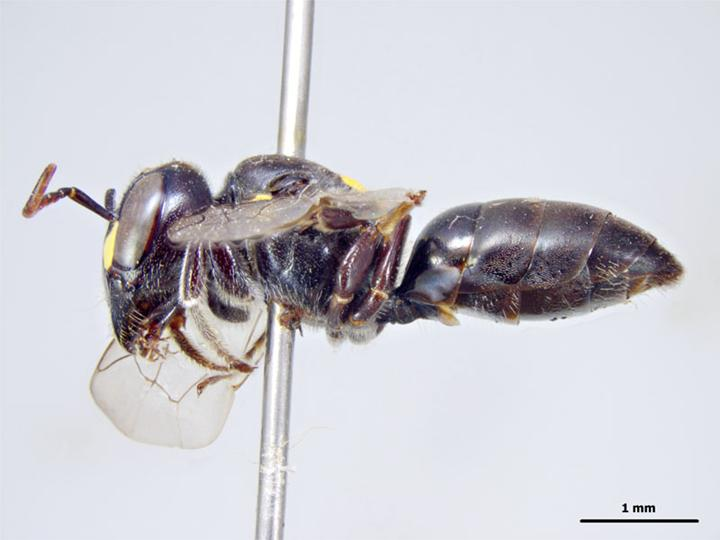
- Female

Scientific classification
- Kingdom: Animalia
- Phylum: Arthropoda
- Clade: Pancrustacea
- Class: Insecta
- Order: Hymenoptera
- Family: Colletidae
- Genus: Hylaeus
- Species: H. burnsi

Binomial name
- Hylaeus burnsi (Michener, 1965)

= Hylaeus burnsi =

Species of bee

Hylaeus burnsi, or Hylaeus (Prosopisteron) burnsi, is a species of bee in the family Colletidae and subfamily Hylaeinae. It is endemic to Australia. It was described by American entomologist Charles Duncan Michener in 1965.

== Etymology ==
The specific epithet burnsi honours A. N. Burns of the National Museum of Victoria.

== Description ==
Female body length is 12 mm, wing length 8 mm. Integumental colouration is mainly black, with yellow markings.

== Distribution and habitat ==
The species occurs in south-eastern mainland Australia. The type locality is Bellbird, Victoria.

== Behaviour ==
The adults are flying mellivores.
