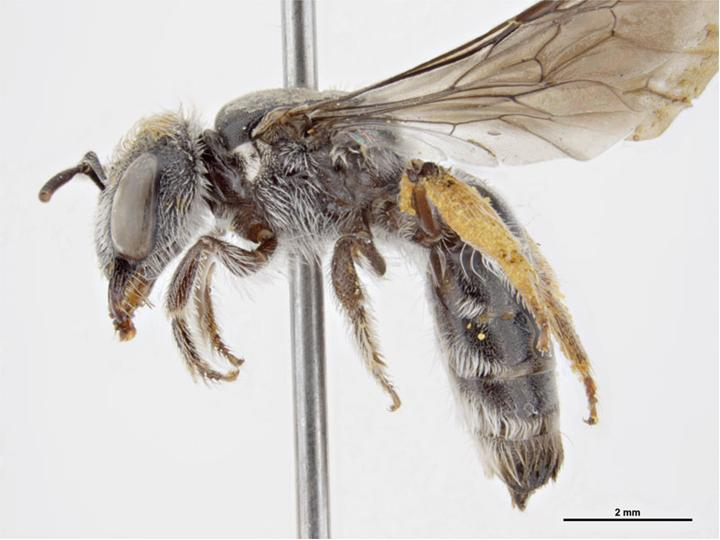
- Female

Scientific classification
- Kingdom: Animalia
- Phylum: Arthropoda
- Clade: Pancrustacea
- Class: Insecta
- Order: Hymenoptera
- Family: Colletidae
- Genus: Leioproctus
- Species: L. contrarius

Binomial name
- Leioproctus contrarius Michener, 1965

= Leioproctus contrarius =

Species of bee

Leioproctus contrarius, or Leioproctus (Colletopsis) contrarius, is a species of bee in the family Colletidae and subfamily Colletinae. It is endemic to Australia. It was described by American entomologist Charles Duncan Michener in 1965.

== Etymology ==
The specific epithet contrarius refers to the contrasting punctation of body parts, especially the head and the thorax.

== Description ==
Female body length 10 mm, forewing length 7 mm. Integumental colouration mainly black and brown, hair white to yellowish and brown.

== Distribution and habitat ==
The species occurs in south-west Western Australia. The type locality is Bullsbrook.

== Behaviour ==
The adults are flying mellivores.

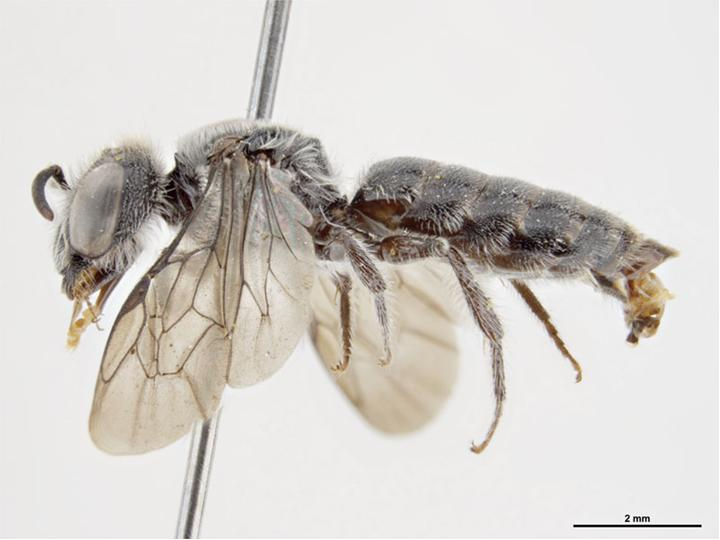
Male
