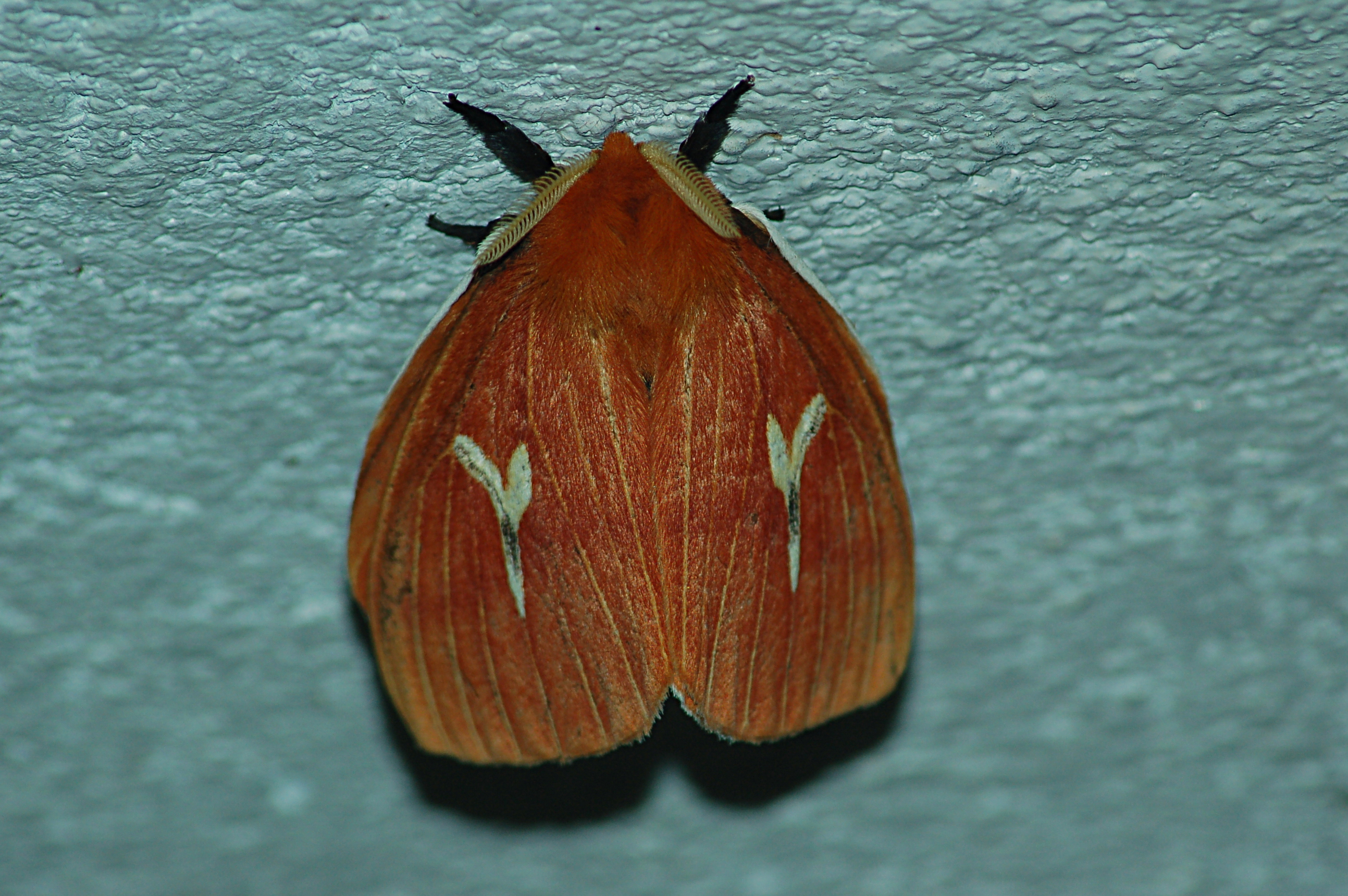
- Cerodirphia mota

Scientific classification
- Domain: Eukaryota
- Kingdom: Animalia
- Phylum: Arthropoda
- Class: Insecta
- Order: Lepidoptera
- Family: Saturniidae
- Subfamily: Hemileucinae
- Genus: Cerodirphia; Michener, 1949

Species
- See text

= Cerodirphia =

Genus of moths

Cerodirphia is a genus of moths in the family Saturniidae first described by Charles Duncan Michener in 1949.

== Species ==
The genus includes the following species:

- Cerodirphia apunctata Dias & Lemaire, 1991
- Cerodirphia araguensis Lemaire, 1971
- Cerodirphia avenata (Draudt, 1930)
- Cerodirphia bahiana Lemaire, 2002
- Cerodirphia barbuti Rougerie & Herbin, 2004
- Cerodirphia brunnea (Draudt, 1930)
- Cerodirphia candida Lemaire, 1969
- Cerodirphia cutteri (Schaus, 1927)
- Cerodirphia flammans Lemaire, 1973
- Cerodirphia flavoscripta (Dognin, 1901)
- Cerodirphia flavosignata (F. Johnson & Michener, 1948)
- Cerodirphia gualaceensis Lemaire, 2002
- Cerodirphia harrisae Lemaire, 1975
- Cerodirphia inopinata Lemaire, 1982
- Cerodirphia lojensis Lemaire, 1988
- Cerodirphia marahuaca Lemaire, 1971
- Cerodirphia mielkei Lemaire, 2002
- Cerodirphia mota (Druce, 1911)
- Cerodirphia nadiana Lemaire, 1975
- Cerodirphia ockendeni Lemaire, 1985
- Cerodirphia opis (Schaus, 1892)
- Cerodirphia peigleri Naumann, Brosch & Wenczel, 2005
- Cerodirphia porioni Lemaire, 1982
- Cerodirphia radama (Druce, 1904)
- Cerodirphia rosacordis (Walker, 1855)
- Cerodirphia rubripes (Draudt, 1930)
- Cerodirphia sanctimartinensis Lemaire, 1982
- Cerodirphia speciosa (Cramer, 1777)
- Cerodirphia vagans (Walker, 1855)
- Cerodirphia wellingi Lemaire, 1973
- Cerodirphia zikani (Schaus, 1921)
