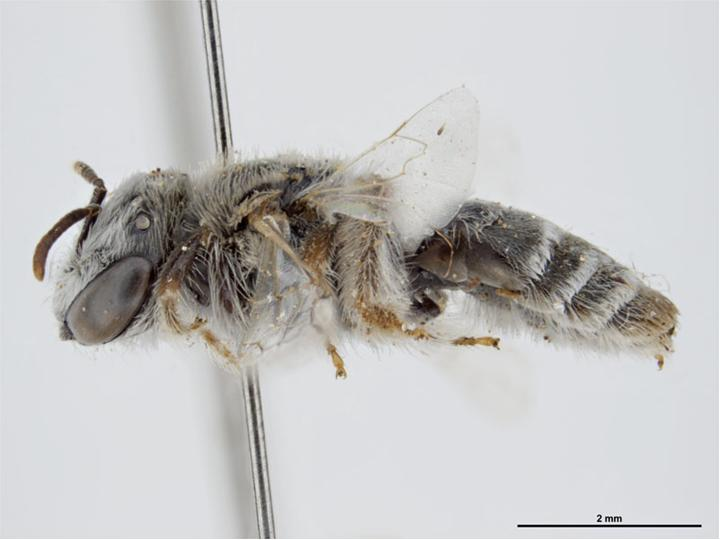
- Female

Scientific classification
- Kingdom: Animalia
- Phylum: Arthropoda
- Clade: Pancrustacea
- Class: Insecta
- Order: Hymenoptera
- Family: Colletidae
- Genus: Leioproctus
- Species: L. impatellatus

Binomial name
- Leioproctus impatellatus Michener, 1965

= Leioproctus impatellatus =

Species of bee

Leioproctus impatellatus, or Leioproctus (Excolletes) impatellatus, is a species of bee in the family Colletidae and subfamily Colletinae. It is endemic to Australia. It was described by American entomologist Charles Duncan Michener in 1965.

== Etymology ==
The specific epithet impatellatus is an anatomical reference to the lack of basitibial plates or "patellae".

== Description ==
Female body length 8 mm, forewing length 4.5 mm; male body length 5.5 mm, forewing length 3.5 mm. Integumental colouration mainly black, hair white through brown to black.

== Distribution and habitat ==
The species occurs in inland central and eastern mainland Australia. The type locality is Tibooburra in the far north-west of New South Wales.

== Behaviour ==
The adults are flying mellivores. Flowering plants visited by the bees include Corymbia terminalis as well as Grevillea species.

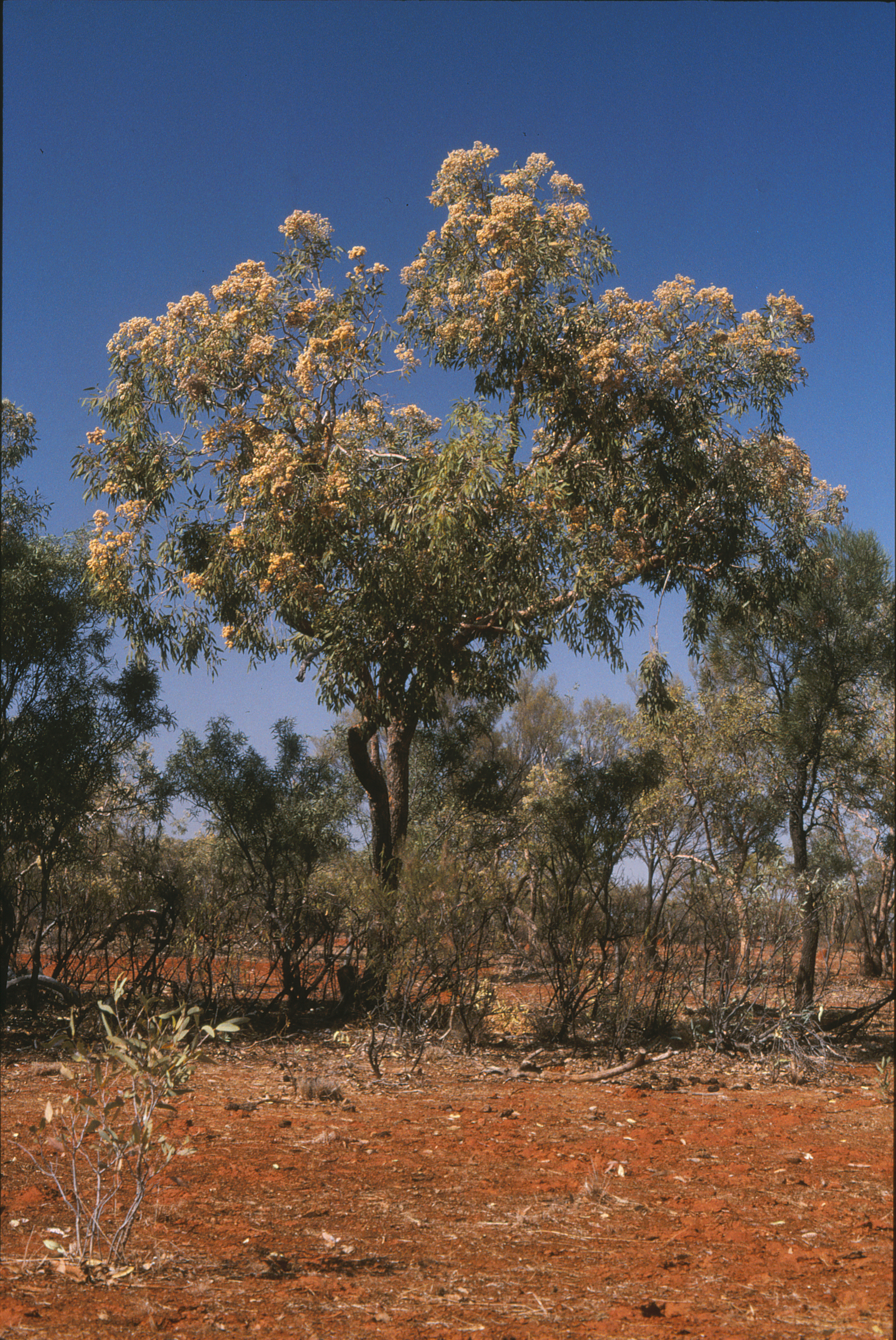
Corymbia terminalis (inland bloodwood), a forage plant of the bees

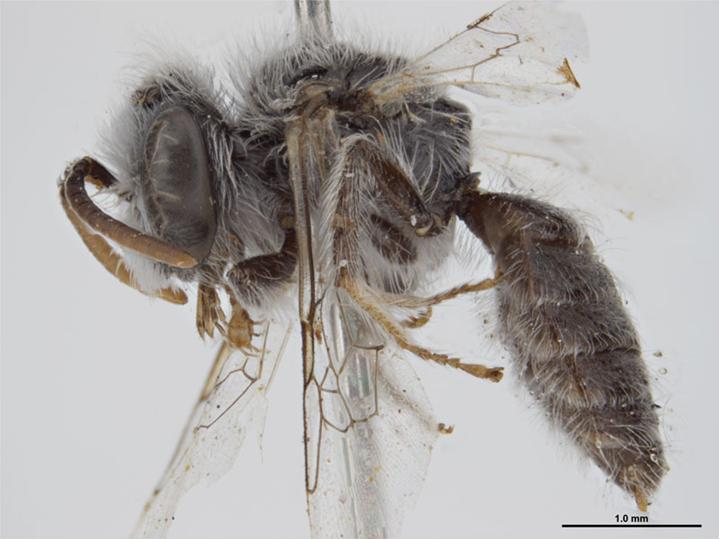
Male
