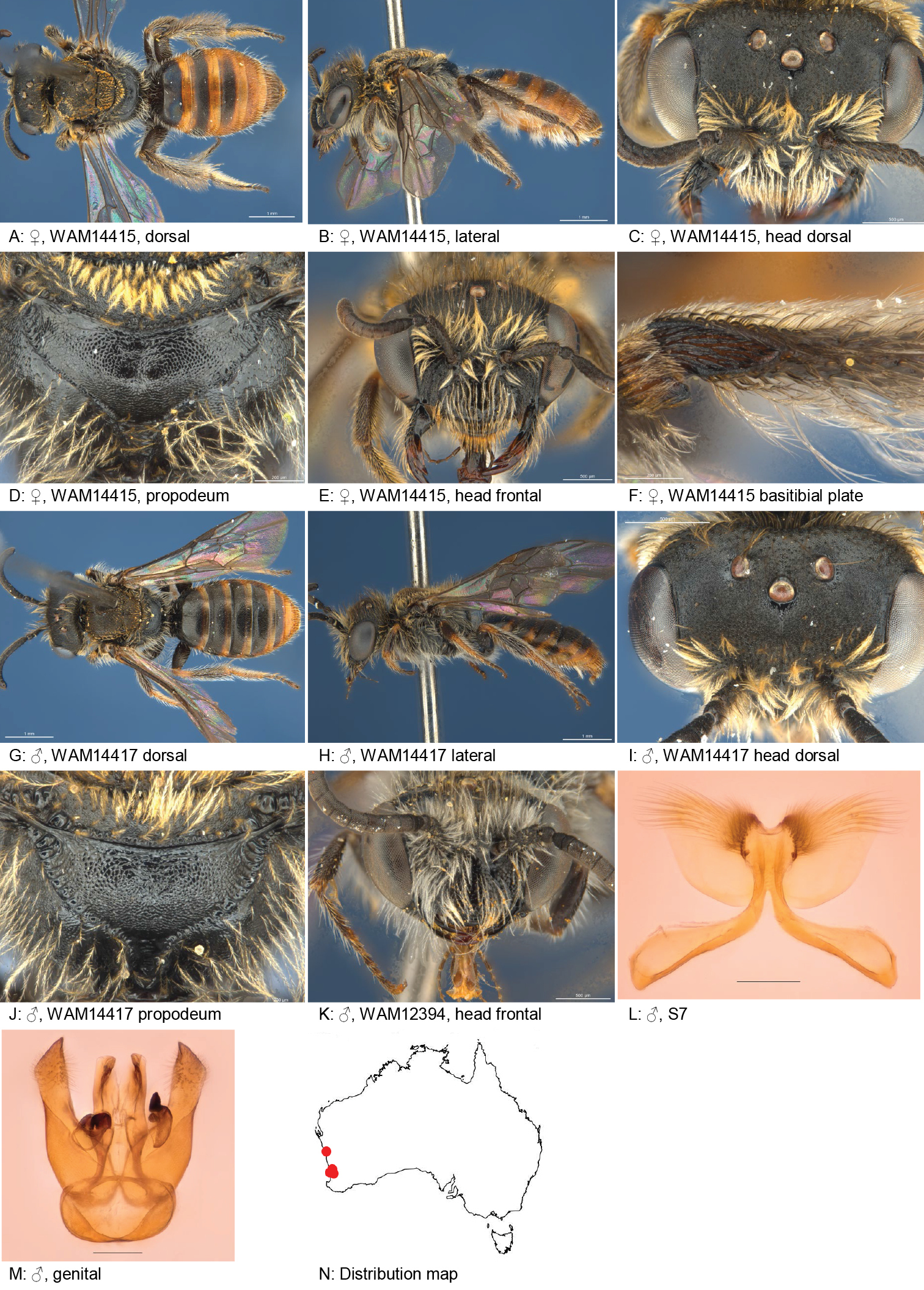

Scientific classification
- Kingdom: Animalia
- Phylum: Arthropoda
- Clade: Pancrustacea
- Class: Insecta
- Order: Hymenoptera
- Family: Colletidae
- Genus: Leioproctus
- Species: L. velutinellus

Binomial name
- Leioproctus velutinellus Michener, 1965

Synonyms
- Andrenopsis velutinus Cockerell, 1929

= Leioproctus velutinellus =

Species of bee

Leioproctus velutinellus, or Leioproctus (Colletellus) velutinellus, is a species of bee in the family Colletidae and subfamily Colletinae. It is endemic to Australia. It was described by American entomologist Charles Duncan Michener in 1965.

== Distribution and habitat ==
The species occurs in Western Australia. The type locality is Kojarena, near Geraldton.

== Behaviour ==
The adults are flying mellivores. Flowering plants visited by the bees include Stylidium bulbiferum and Boronia species.
