= Leioproctus nigrifrons =

Scientific classification
- Kingdom: Animalia
- Phylum: Arthropoda
- Clade: Pancrustacea
- Class: Insecta
- Order: Hymenoptera
- Family: Colletidae
- Genus: Leioproctus
- Species: L. nigrifrons

Binomial name
- Leioproctus nigrifrons Michener, 1965

Species of bee

Leioproctus nigrifrons, or Leioproctus (Andrenopsis) nigrifrons, is a species of bee in the family Colletidae and subfamily Colletinae. It is endemic to Australia. It was described by American entomologist Charles Duncan Michener in 1965.

== Etymology ==
The specific epithet nigrifrons is an anatomical reference to the lack of yellow markings on the face of the male.

== Description ==
Male body length 7 mm, forewing length almost 5 mm. Integumental colouration mainly black, hair white to pale yellow.

== Distribution and habitat ==
The species occurs in eastern Australia. The type locality is Sunnybank, Queensland.

== Behaviour ==
The adults are flying mellivores.
