= Leioproctus minimus =

Scientific classification
- Kingdom: Animalia
- Phylum: Arthropoda
- Clade: Pancrustacea
- Class: Insecta
- Order: Hymenoptera
- Family: Colletidae
- Genus: Leioproctus
- Species: L. minimus

Binomial name
- Leioproctus minimus Michener, 1965

Species of bee

Leioproctus minimus, or Leioproctus (Baeocolletes) minimus, is a species of bee in the family Colletidae and subfamily Colletinae. It is endemic to Australia. It was described by American entomologist Charles Duncan Michener in 1965.

== Etymology ==
The specific epithet minimus refers to the small size of the bees.

== Description ==
Male body length nearly 4.5 mm, forewing length nearly 3 mm. Integumental colouration mainly black and brown, hair white.

== Distribution and habitat ==
The species occurs in the Murchison region of Western Australia. The type locality is Meekatharra.

== Behaviour ==
The adults are flying mellivores.
