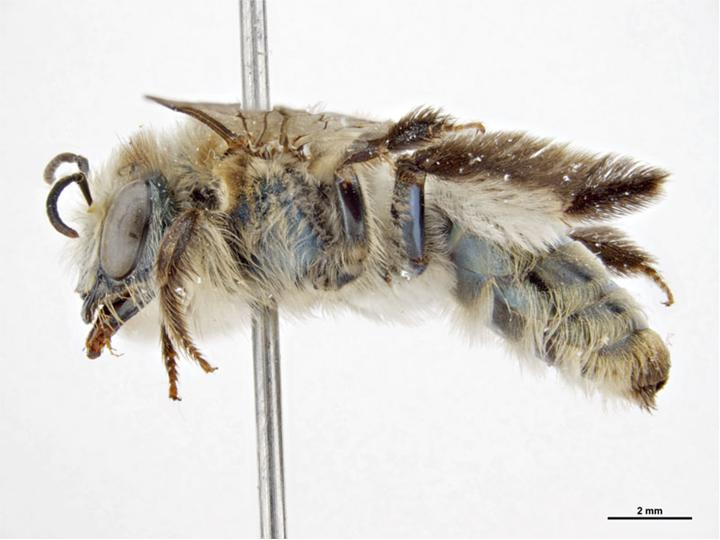
- Female

Scientific classification
- Kingdom: Animalia
- Phylum: Arthropoda
- Clade: Pancrustacea
- Class: Insecta
- Order: Hymenoptera
- Family: Colletidae
- Genus: Leioproctus
- Species: L. megachalcoides

Binomial name
- Leioproctus megachalcoides Michener, 1965

= Leioproctus megachalcoides =

Species of bee

Leioproctus megachalcoides, or Leioproctus (Leioproctus) megachalcoides, is a species of bee in the family Colletidae and subfamily Colletinae. It is endemic to Australia. It was described by American entomologist Charles Duncan Michener in 1965.

== Etymology ==
The specific epithet megachalcoides refers to the superficial resemblance of the species to L. megachalceus (syn. L. fulvus).

== Description ==
The female holotype body length is 17 mm, wing length 11 mm. Integumental colouration is mainly a strong blue-green; the hair is white through brown to black.

== Distribution and habitat ==
The species occurs in Western Australia. The type locality is Mullewa, near Geraldton.

== Behaviour ==
The adults are flying mellivores.

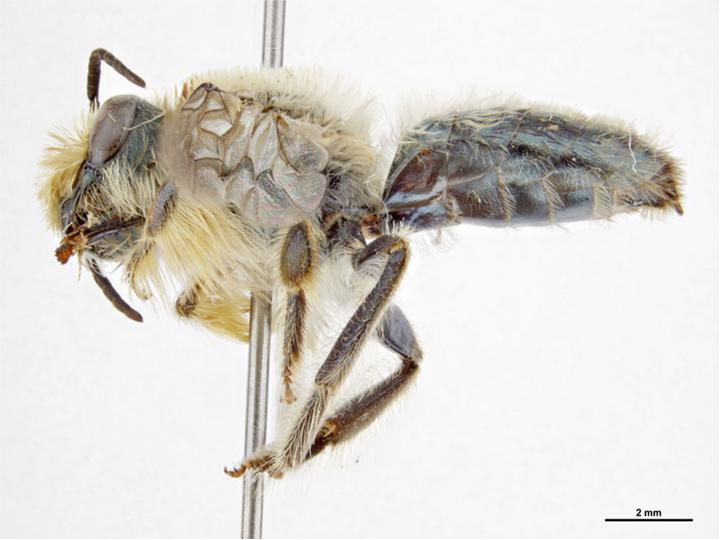
Male
