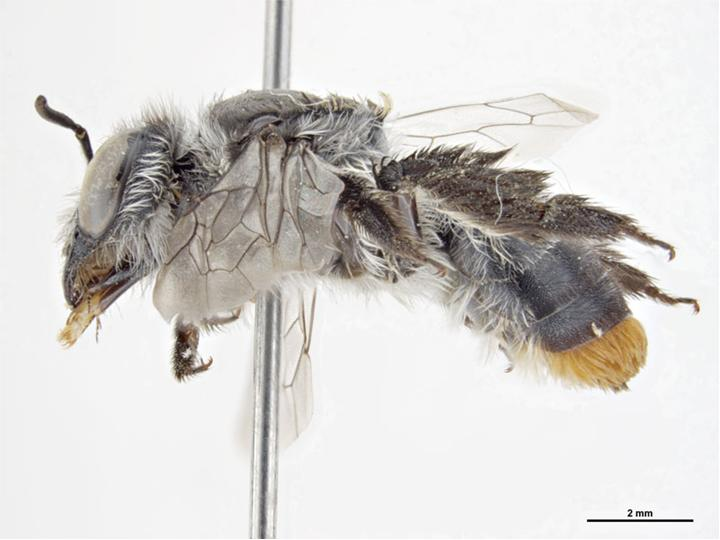
- Female

Scientific classification
- Kingdom: Animalia
- Phylum: Arthropoda
- Clade: Pancrustacea
- Class: Insecta
- Order: Hymenoptera
- Family: Colletidae
- Genus: Leioproctus
- Species: L. rhodurus

Binomial name
- Leioproctus rhodurus Michener, 1965

= Leioproctus rhodurus =

Species of bee

Leioproctus rhodurus, or Leioproctus (Urocolletes) rhodurus, is a species of bee in the family Colletidae and subfamily Colletinae. It is endemic to Australia. It was described by American entomologist Charles Duncan Michener in 1965.

== Etymology ==
The specific epithet rhodurus refers to the red hair on the apex of the metasoma.

== Description ==
The female holotype body length is nearly 12 mm, wing length 7 mm. Integumental colouration is mainly black, with some brown; the hair is white, black and red.

== Distribution and habitat ==
The species occurs in south-west Western Australia. The type locality is Midland, in Perth.

== Behaviour ==
The adults are flying mellivores. Flowering plants visited by the bees include Leptospermum species.

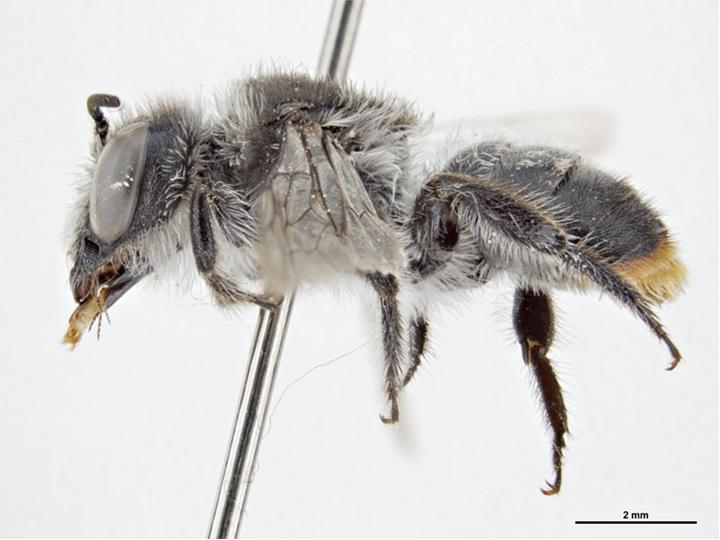
Male
