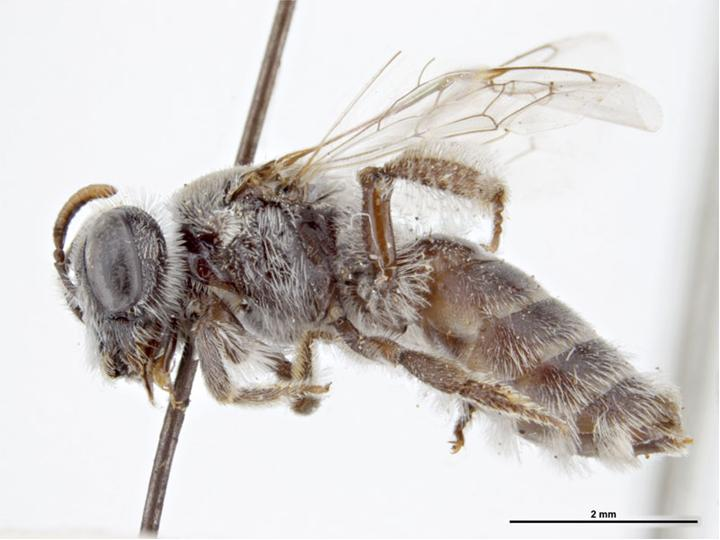
- Female

Scientific classification
- Kingdom: Animalia
- Phylum: Arthropoda
- Clade: Pancrustacea
- Class: Insecta
- Order: Hymenoptera
- Family: Colletidae
- Genus: Leioproctus
- Species: L. microsomus

Binomial name
- Leioproctus microsomus Michener, 1965: Leioproctus (Microcolletes) microsomus Michener, 1965

= Leioproctus microsomus =

Species of bee

Leioproctus microsomus, or Leioproctus (Minycolletes) microsomus, is a species of bee in the family Colletidae and subfamily Colletinae. It is endemic to Australia. It was described by American entomologist Charles Duncan Michener in 1965.

== Etymology ==
The specific epithet microsomus refers to the small body size.

== Description ==
The female holotype body length is nearly 7 mm, wing length 4.5 mm; male allotype body length 5.5 mm, wing length 4.3 mm. Integumental colouration is mainly black, with some red and brown; the hair is dull white to grey-brown.

== Distribution and habitat ==
The species occurs in eastern Australia. The type locality is 27 km south of Dalby, in the Western Downs Region of southern Queensland.

== Behaviour ==
The adults are flying mellivores. Flowering plants visited by the bees include Wahlenbergia species.

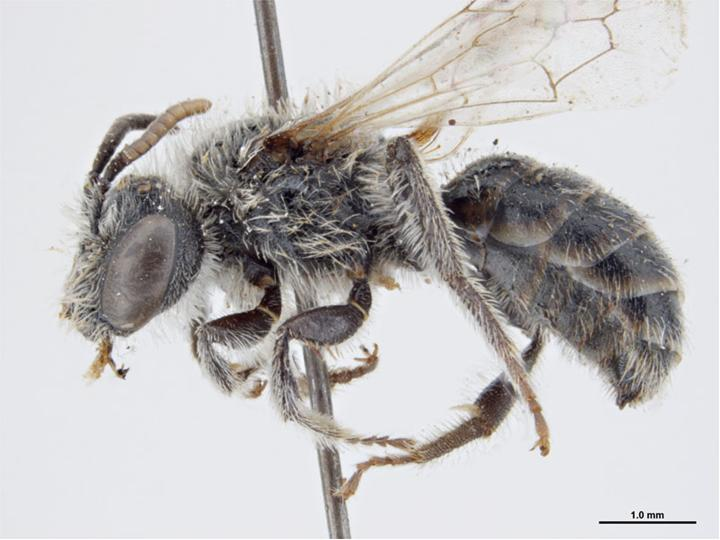
Male
