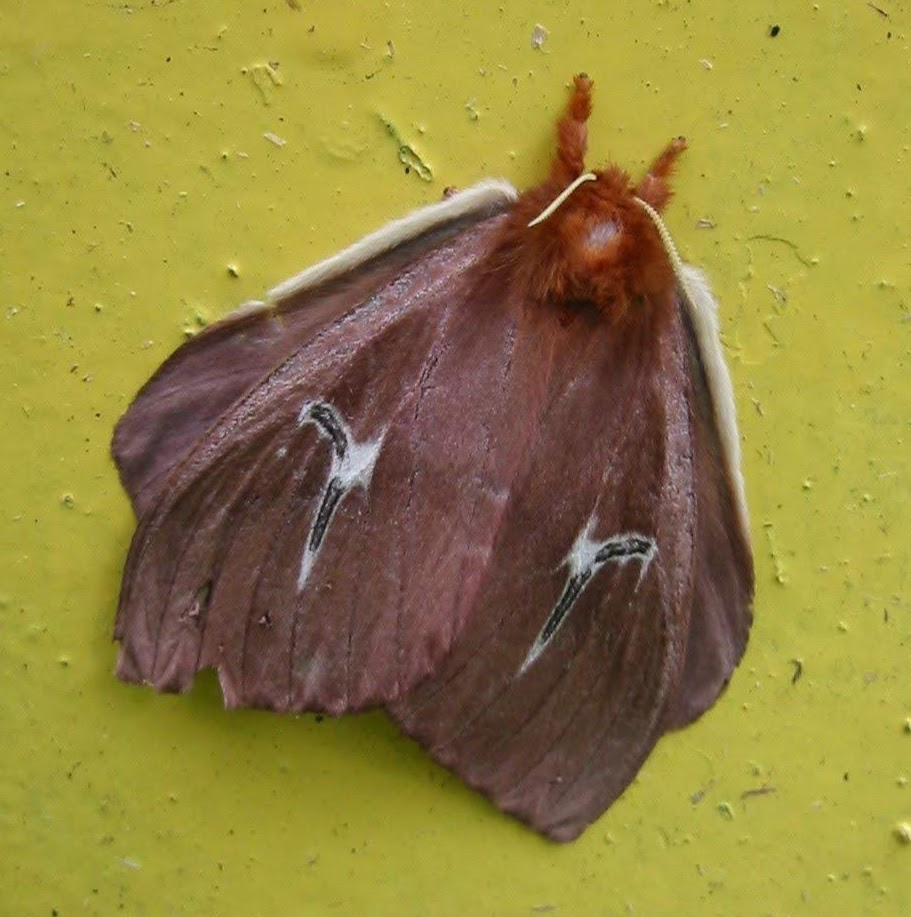

Scientific classification
- Kingdom: Animalia
- Phylum: Arthropoda
- Clade: Pancrustacea
- Class: Insecta
- Order: Lepidoptera
- Family: Saturniidae
- Genus: Cerodirphia
- Species: C. avenata

Binomial name
- Cerodirphia avenata (Draudt, 1930)

Synonyms
- Dirphia avenata Draudt, 1930

= Cerodirphia avenata =

Species of moth

Cerodirphia avenata is a moth of the family Saturniidae. It is found in Costa Rica, Colombia, Venezuela, and Panama.

== Subspecies ==
- Cerodirphia avenata avenata
- Cerodirphia avenata araguensis Lemaire, 1971 (Venezuela)
