= Janine Caira =

Janine N Caira
- Born: Montreal, Quebec
- Education: University of British Columbia/University of Nebraska
- Known for: Tapeworm research
- Scientific career
- Fields: Parasitology
- Workplaces: University of Connecticut Ecology & Evolutionary Biology
- Thesis: A revision of the North American papillose Allocreadiidae with independent cladistic analysis of larval and adult forms (1985)
- Doctoral advisor: Mary Hansen Pritchard
- Website: https://tapeworms.uconn.edu/

Janine Caira Ph.D. (b. 9 November 1957), is an academic researcher specializing in the taxonomy, evolution and diversity of tapeworms that live in the digestive tract of sharks and stingrays. Related work includes applying the practice of categorizing groups of organisms based on their most recent common ancestor to advance the phylogenetic systematics of tapeworms and demonstrating the importance of accurate host identification. She is a Board of Trustees Distinguished Professor in the Department of Ecology & Evolutionary Biology at the University of Connecticut.

== Early life and education ==
Caira was born 9 November 1957 in Montreal, Quebec. She has six siblings; her parents were health care workers (physician, nurse). Prior to high school the family relocated to New Brunswick and then to St Catherine's in Southern Ontario. During high school she became interested in gymnastics. During her senior year and into her time in college, she was involved with an Agriculture Canada science project studying a root feeding nematode vector of a virus threatening a grape cultivar. She began her undergraduate education at University of Guelph and transferred after her 2nd year to University of British Columbia where she earned a B.Sc. in zoology. Her master's degree followed at University of British Columbia 1981.

A field trip to Mexico, ostensibly to study rattlesnake parasites, did not go as planned. She pivoted to another host group: sharks. This was the beginning of her long-standing study of tapeworms

== Career ==
After completing her PhD program at University of Nebraska–Lincoln, Caira was hired as assistant professor at the University of Connecticut in 1985. She became a Board of Trustees Distinguished Professor in Ecology & Evolutionary Biology at the University of Connecticut in 2006.

Her writing and research led to 17 National Science Foundation grants, 52 percent of which were in excess of $400,000. She has contributed over 200 specimens to the National Museum of Natural History, many of which were newly identified species.

Caira is the director of the Connecticut State Museum of Natural History.

== Research ==
One of Caira's major contributions to the fields of taxonomy and parasitology is Tapeworms from Vertebrate Bowels of the Earth. In collaboration with University of Kansas scientist Kristen Jensen, they catalogued and created a searchable database of all animal intestinal parasites. This included 211 species that had not previously been described. Through funding by the National Science foundation, Caira published “Tapeworms from Vertebrate Bowels of the Earth.” This comprehensive work, which Caira edited with University of Kansas scientist Kristen Jensen, is the result of an eight-year effort to survey the intestinal parasites of animals from around the world. The book inventories 4,810 species collected from all oceans and every continent except Antarctica." It also introduces 211 species that were heretofore unknown. “They sequenced genomes, restructured evolutionary trees and sought out previously unknown connections between parasites and their hosts".
