= Edward M. Barrows =

American entomologist

Edward M. Barrows (born August 8, 1946, in Detroit, Michigan) is a biologist who earned his BS in Botany and Zoology at the University of Michigan, Ann Arbor, in 1968, and his PhD in entomology, mentored by Charles Duncan Michener, at the University of Kansas, Lawrence in 1975. Further, he is a retired U.S. Army officer. He has had a lifetime interest in nature, science, and art. He performed research on bee nesting, predation, and reproductive behavior, for example, finding that female Lasioglossum zephyrus sweat bees have individual odors perceived by conspecific males. This was evidently the first discovery of invertebrate individual odors, as opposed to group or nest odors. He later found that males of the Xylocopa virginica virginica (large carpenter bee) have highly complex mate searching and mate-acquisition behaviors, perhaps more complicated that any other bee species and many other animal species. Students and he studied feeding behavior and recovery from injuries in Mimus polyglottos (northern mockingbirds). With students and established scientists, he studied or is studying arthropod community structure in a rare, freshwater, tidal, marsh, and associated habitats, evolution of floral display in Asclepias syriaca (common milkweed), parasitization and reproductive behavior of chalcidoid wasps, floral associates of rare plants, and other topics. His research in scientific communication led to the book Animal Desk Reference, A Dictionary of Animal Behavior, Ecology, and Evolution (3rd edition). His current research laboratory, the Laboratory of Entomology and Biodiversity, is in the Heyden Observatory of Georgetown University.

He has written popular-style nature articles, for example, for The Kansas City Star and The Washington Star and The Echo (the Glen Echo, Maryland, town newsletter). In his popular-style book Nature, Gardens, and Georgetown (2006), he described biodiversity and changes in the natural environment at Georgetown University and nearby places.

At the college level, he taught animal behavior, botany, entomology, earth stewardship, forest ecology, history of life, and sociobiology at Georgetown University, University of Kansas, and University of Michigan. He has been a professor in the Department of Biology at Georgetown, since 1975, where he mentored many undergraduate senior-thesis students, MS, and PhD students.

His honors include being an honorary life-member of a premier conservation organization Friends of Dyke Marsh, a long-term research associate of the Smithsonian Institution, an Engelhard Teaching Fellow, a National Defense Education Act Fellow, an elected president of the Entomological Society of Washington, elected officer of the Glen Echo Heights Citizens' Association, an elected member of the Washington Biologists' Field Club (WBFC), and appointment as a member of the American Institute of Biological Sciences Council, and the Director of the Center for the Environment and the Director of Environmental Education at Georgetown University. He has been a biological consultant for the Air National Guard and the National Geographic Society. His students' and his research have been supported by the Friends of Dyke Marsh, Georgetown University, the National Park Service, the National Science Foundation, Sigma Xi, and the WBFC.
