= Norman Maier =

American experimental psychologist (1900–1977)

Norman R. F. Maier
- Born: Norman Raymond Frederick Maier; 1900
- Died: 1977 (aged 76–77)
- Occupation: Experimental psychologist

Norman Raymond Frederick Maier (1900–1977) was an American experimental psychologist who worked primarily at the University of Michigan. He invented the two-cords problem and co-authored Principles of Animal Psychology.

== Biography ==
Although rarely discussed today, Maier's research received extensive publicity in its day.

In 1931, he invented the two-cords problem.

Together with his student Theodore C. Schneirla, Maier authored the classic textbook, Principles of Animal Psychology (1935). His research on rats during the 1930s and 1940s challenged the reigning behaviorist paradigm, by postulating cognitive processes akin to what was then being described by psychoanalysis.

In the 1950s, Maier changed his area of research to industrial psychology, he claimed in response to prejudicial treatment of him in the profession led by Clifford Morgan.

Maier graduated with a BA from the University of Michigan in 1923. After a year of graduate work, he studied at the University of Berlin during 1925 and 1926, and completed his PhD at Michigan in 1928. Maier was a National Research Council Fellow with Karl Lashley at the University of Chicago in 1929-1931, and joined the faculty at Michigan in 1931.

The formative influences on Maier included John F. Shepard at Michigan; Wolfgang Köhler, Max Wertheimer, and Kurt Lewin in Berlin; Karl Lashley and Heinrich Kluver at Chicago.

== Books ==
On animal psychology:

- Reasoning in white rats (Baltimore: Johns Hopkins Press, 1929; originally a thesis presented at the University of Michigan in 1928)
- [with H. Willard Reninger] A psychological approach to literary criticism (New York, London: D. Appleton and Company, 1933)
- [with T.C. Schneirla] Principles of animal psychology (New York: McGraw-Hill, 1935; revised ed. 1964)
- A further analysis of reasoning in rats. II. The integration of four separate experiences in problem solving. III. The influence of cortical injuries on the process of “direction.” (Baltimore: Johns Hopkins Press, 1938)
- Studies of abnormal behavior in the rat : the neurotic pattern and an analysis of the situation which produces it (New York, London: Harper & brothers, 1939).
- Studies of abnormal behavior in the rat. II. A comparison of some convulsion-producing situations (Baltimore: Johns Hopkins Press, 1940)

On I/O psychology

- Psychology in industry; a psychological approach to industrial problems (Boston, New York: Houghton Mifflin, 1946; 2nd ed. 1955)
- Frustration: the study of behavior without a goal (Ann Arbor: University of Michigan Press, 1949)
- Principles of human relations: applications to management (New York: Wiley, 1952)
- [with Allen R. Solem and Ayesha A. Maier] Supervisory and executive development: a manual for role playing (New York: Wiley, 1957; revised ed. 1975 under the title The role-play technique: a handbook for management and leadership practice.)
- The appraisal interview: objectives, methods, and skills (New York: Wiley, 1958; revised edition 1975 under the title The appraisal interview: three basic approaches)
- [with John J. Hayes] Creative management (New York: Wiley, 1962)
- Problem-solving discussions and conferences: leadership methods and skills (New York: McGraw-Hill, 1963)
- Problem solving and creativity in individuals and groups (Belmont, Calif., Brooks/Cole Pub. Co., 1970)

== Secondary literature ==
- “ ‘Neurosis of rats’ wins science prize.” The New York Times, January 1, 1939, p. 21.
- “Scientist who double-crossed rats into lunacy wins $1,000.” The Washington Post, January 1, 1939, pp. 1, 4.
- “Rats are driven crazy by insoluble problems.” Life, March 6, 1939, pp. 66–68 (with 13 illustrations).
- “Cure for Germans?” Time, June 26, 1944, pp. 58–59.
- “Norman Maier, 76; Noted psychologist at U. of Michigan” (obituary). The New York Times, September 27, 1977, p. 42.
- Solem, A., & McKeachie, W. J. (1979). “Norman R. F. Maier (1900-1977)” (obituary). American Psychologist 34: 266-267.
- Dewsbury, D. (1993). “On publishing controversy: Norman R. F. Maier and the genesis of seizures.” American Psychologist 48(8): 869-877.
