= Connecticut State Museum of Natural History =

Museum at the University of Connecticut, U.S.

Coordinates: 41.8104°N 72.2559°W

- Established: 1985
- Location: Storrs, Connecticut, US
- Type: Natural history museum
- Director: Janine Caira
- Website: csmnh.uconn.edu

The Connecticut State Museum of Natural History (CSMNH) is located in Storrs, Connecticut, as part of the University of Connecticut. It was established in 1985 as Connecticut's official natural history museum.

== Collections ==
The museum stewards and preserves a large scope of natural history and archaeological collections from Connecticut and beyond. The natural history collections comprise more than 6,000 objects such as fossils, minerals, shells, and taxidermied insects, birds, and mammals, including the “Pope Mastodon," excavated in 1913 and one of the largest and most complete mastodon skeletons discovered in New England. The museum houses the Office of State Archaeology, which is home to "the largest repository of Connecticut archaeology" in existence, covering one million years of human history and culture. Cultural collections include stone tool technology and Native American artifacts and cultural materials from Connecticut.

== History ==
Founded by the University of Connecticut in Storrs in 1982, the museum was established as the State Museum of Natural History in 1985 by state statute. It officially opened to the public that same year. The museum's founding director and the force behind its creation was UConn biology faculty member Carl Rettenmeyer, who led the museum from its founding until his retirement in 1996. The museum moved into its first permanent space in a campus building on Hillside Road in Storrs in 2000.

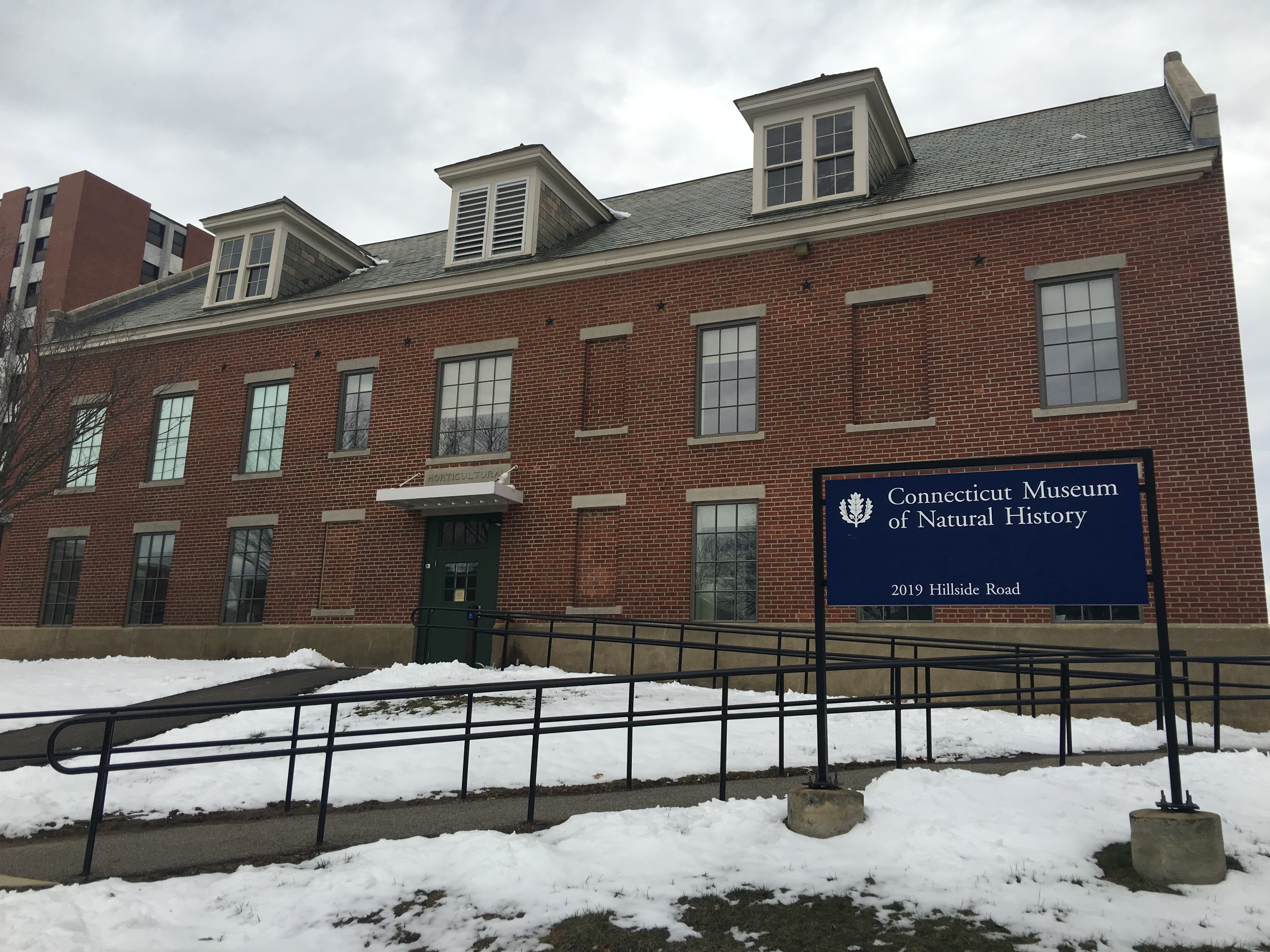
The former home of the CSMNH at Hillside Road on the UConn campus

In August 2016, the University of Connecticut closed the museum's physical spaces on Hillside Road. The building was instead populated with offices of the UConn College of Liberal Arts and Sciences. The editors of The Daily Campus, UConn's student newspaper, criticized the decision, commenting in an editorial that "the concept of a 'museum' without a physical space is stretching what we can define as a museum."

While lacking a centralized exhibit space since 2016, the museum continues to maintain its collections, engage in community outreach and education, and host programs and events. The museum also creates permanent exhibits installed on the UConn campus as well as temporary exhibits that rotate locations.

As of 2023, the University of Connecticut’s Institute of the Environment, which has administrative oversight over the Connecticut State Museum of Natural History as well as other university offices, is pursuing a Living Building initiative, with the CSMNH planned as the centerpiece of the new environmental commons.
