= Carlo Jucci =

Italian biologist and geneticist

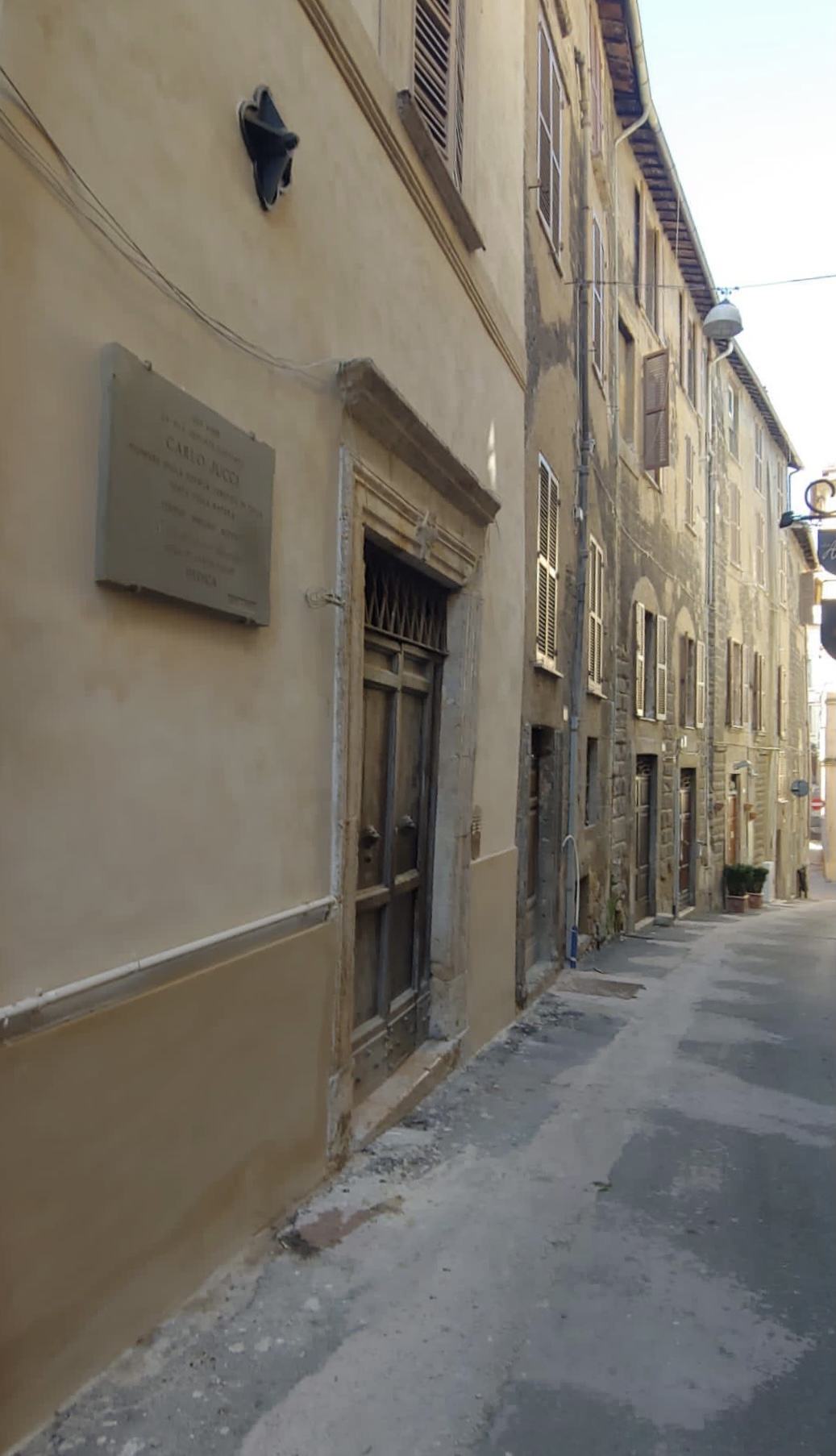
House where Jucci lived his early life.

Carlo Jucci (28 June 1897 in Rieti – 22 October 1962 in Rome) was a biologist and geneticist.

An important contribution by Jucci were his studies on the silkworm, whose metabolism he investigated comparing larval growth among several races of the moth, thus opening a new chapter in the comparative physiology. Jucci was also interested in biochemical genetics and he directed his attention especially to the silkworm cocoon color. His studies concerning the migration of leaf pigments and differential permeability of the intestine, and silkworm salivary gland function on carotenoids and flavones were the first example of biochemical genetics in the animal world.

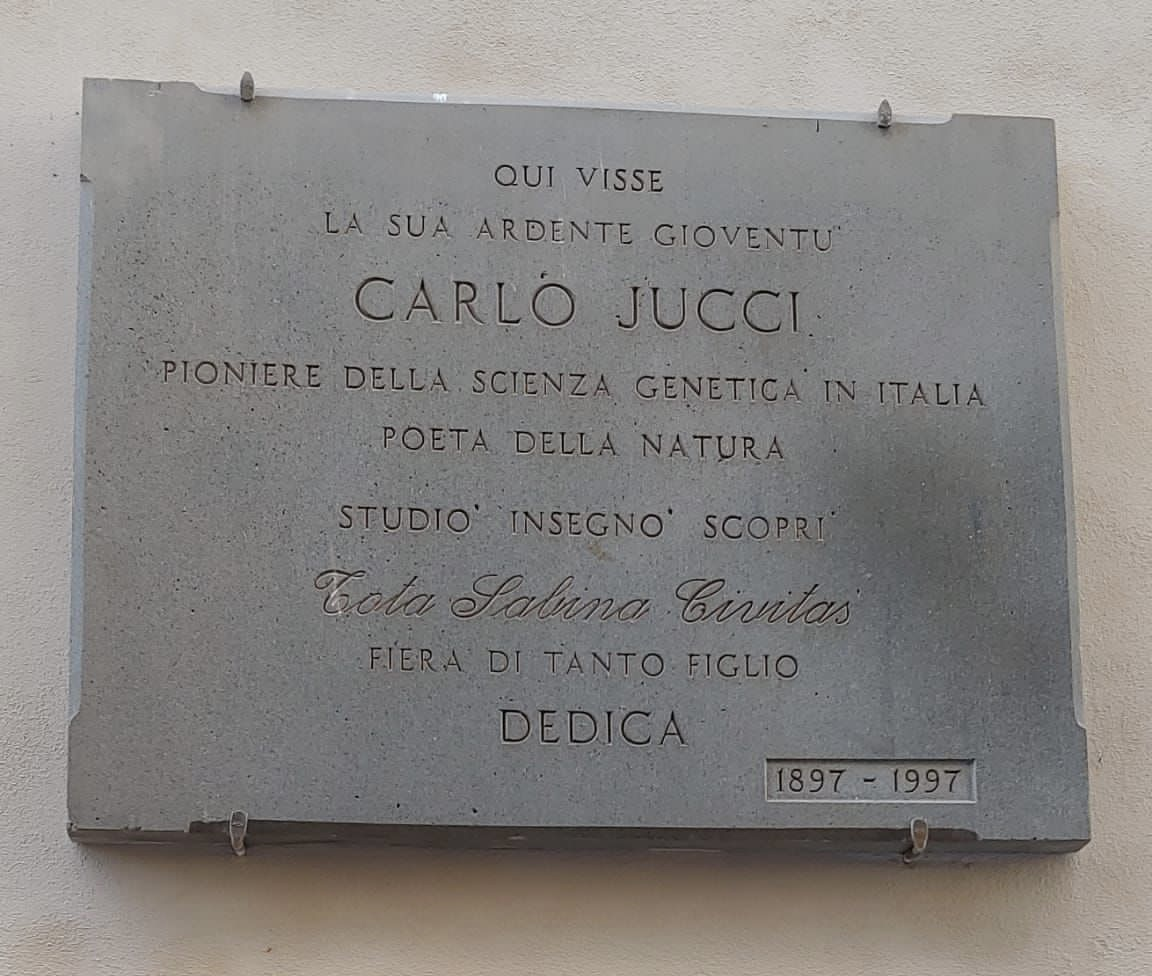
Commemorative plaque, Rieti

== Education and career ==
Following a course in classical studies Jucci graduated in natural sciences from the University of Rome on 10 July 1920, defending his thesis on the biology of termites. He was a student of Giovanni Battista Grassi, in particular. He began as an intern in the Institute of Comparative Anatomy and had meanwhile enrolled in the faculty of medicine, to acquire more complete biological training. He obtained a scholarship in Rome from the Fondazione Corsi and then, in 1921, an assistant post in Portici at the biological institute of the Scuola Superiore di Agraria. In 1925 he obtained a degree in medicine and surgery from the University of Naples, and also convincingly passed examinations to qualify as a university lecturer in comparative anatomy and physiology. He was assistant to Filippo Bottazzi at Naples for a year.

In 1927 a grant from the Rockefeller Foundation, allowed him to travel to, and work in the USA, at the Marine Biological Laboratory near Plymouth, Massachusetts. Here, Jucci conducted research on cell permeability and ciliary movement in Actinia. He returned to the Institute of Physiology at the University of Naples the following year, seconded to the Zoological Station. By 1930, he had won the Chair of Zoology and Comparative Anatomy at the University of Sassari. He remained professor and director of the Institute there until his move to the University of Modena in 1932, where he succeeded Daniele Rosa, invertebrate zoologist and hologenomic theorist of evolution (a now outdated theory with similarities to, but distinct from, the modern hologenome theory of evolution). In 1934 he succeeded to the chair of zoology at the University of Pavia, following the death of Cesare Artom, whose studies of the chromosomal and cellular aspects of heredity Jucci wished to build upon.

As part of the 1939 anniversary celebrations in honor of Lazzaro Spallanzani, Jucci organized a scientific conference in Pavia. The same year, he founded a "Center of Genetics" to allow concentration of research and collaboration in experimental genetics. The center was launched alongside a new scientific journal of genetics, Scientia genetica, a periodical with international circulation and wide participation of researchers from Latin countries. This genetics center was merely the forerunner to what was to become Jucci's Institute of Genetics, established in 1941. Within the faculty of science at the University of Pavia, it was the first such Institute in Italy. He was its director until 1947, being succeeded by Adriano Buzzati Traverso. At Jucci's instigation, a center for the genetic study of alpine animal and plant populations was established on Mount Terminillo, becoming fully operational in 1954. The Apennine center had seven laboratories, a library and museum, in addition to land for experimentation, and housed the Society of Agricultural Genetics.

A member of several Italian and foreign academies, Jucci died in Rome on 22 October 1962.

== Research interests and outcomes ==
In all his career, Jucci was inspired by the more general themes of biology, such as evolution, the relationships between genetics, embryology and physiology, and ontogenetic development, and was able to achieve remarkable results in the fields of entomology, comparative physiology, and genetics, documented by about two hundred publications. As for the years within the Roman school of Grassi, he shared the research topics with a debut on the biology of Termitids, a topic of great biological interest, to clarify if the multiple forms assumed by the members of the societies of those Insects are already determined in the egg or depend in some way from external factors. Grassi argued that the colony could stop and divert the development of a number of individuals, destined to become perfect insects, inducing them to assume the form and functions of workers, soldiers or royalty, varying proportions and qualities of food; others, like the Americans Snyder and Thompson had believed to demolish the results of the scientist supporting an intrinsic differentiation during the ontogenetic development of all individuals.

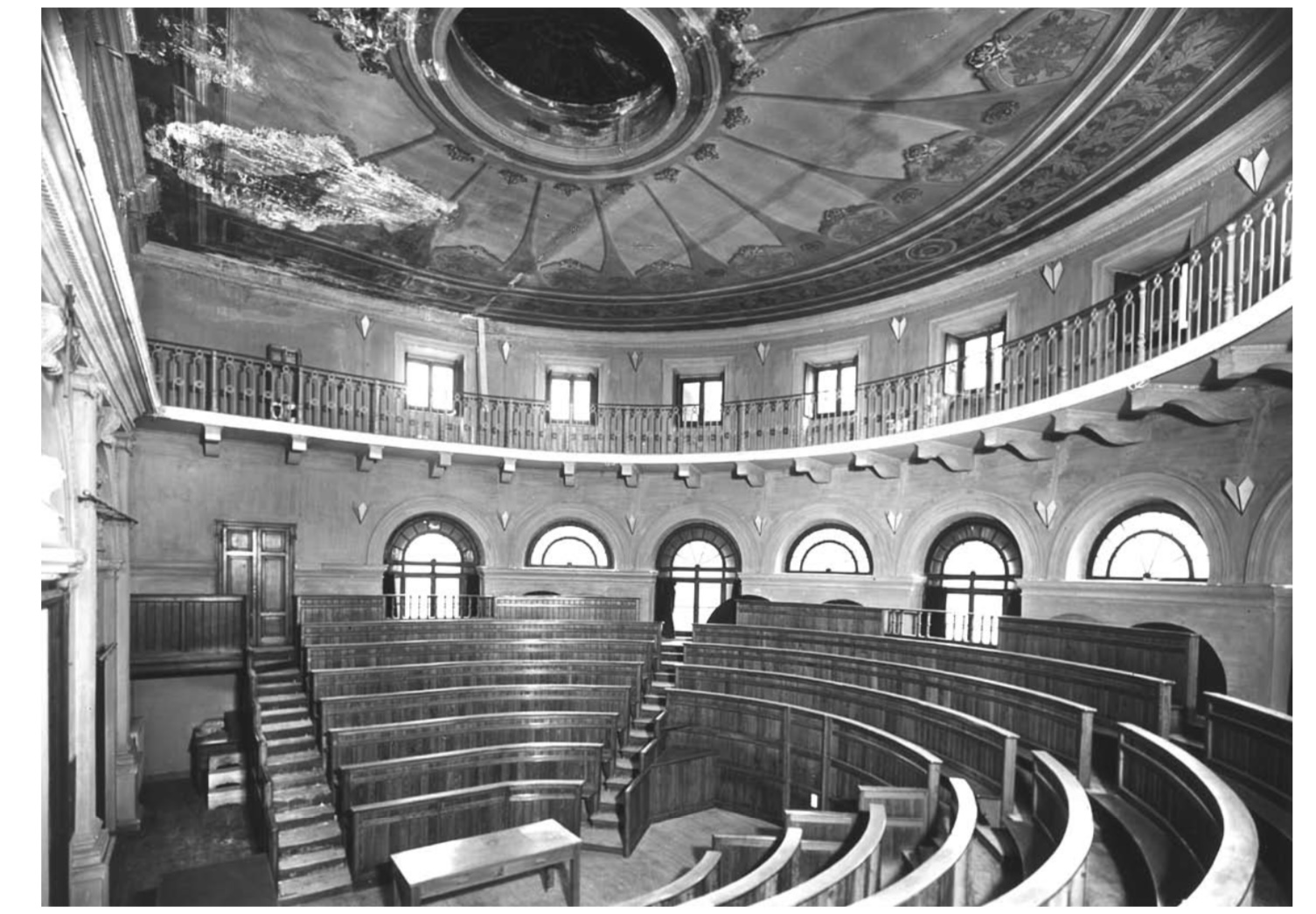
Institute of Zoology L. Spallanzani, where Jucci taught for 30 years.

From the experiments that were objects of his thesis and from successive investigations, that carried on also after the transfer to the agricultural school of Portici, directed from a student of Grassi, Anna Foà, Jucci could confirm the thesis of the teacher, moreover already taken from Filippo Silvestri. He noted that, when the royals are absent in society, a change in diet causes the development of some nymphs to stop and induces the differentiation of the mature genital organs, giving rise to the replacement or neotenic reals. The most original part of the work deals with the different metabolisms found in the different forms and initiated by tissues with glandular activity and new to the histology of those Insects. With the study of excretory functions in real and neotenic, related to histology, and the detection of anabolic and catabolic products in different organisms, Jucci introduced an original method of comparative physiological research.

Additionally, among other things, he hypothesized that the examination of the structure of the tentorial glands showed an evolution occurred in the phylogenetic path of the group and considered that, although the systematic position of the Termites (derived from cockroaches, about 150 million years ago, in the Mesozoic, they evolved convergently with ants in appearance and social behavior) and very distant hymenopterans, It would be reasonable to rely on it to help explain the phenomena of convergence of social insects.

Discovered the existence of the tentorial glands in the species Reticulitermes lucifugus, and made a biometric study of them, he theorized that the mediation of hormonal factors induced by a special diet could have taken to the differentiation of the castes.

He would have been able to reach a broader understanding of the mechanisms of development of insects, confirming his aforementioned hypothesis, if he had continued his researches. Then, Jucci in the agricultural school of Portici turned his interests to the biology of the silkworm, one of the topics most dealt with in the field of breeding, already studied by Italian scientists as Marcello Malpighi and Agostino Bassi but also by scholars active in China and Japan. Thanks to the great variability of the characters, this species can be seen as a privileged material for genetic experimentation that intends to follow its development in various phases.

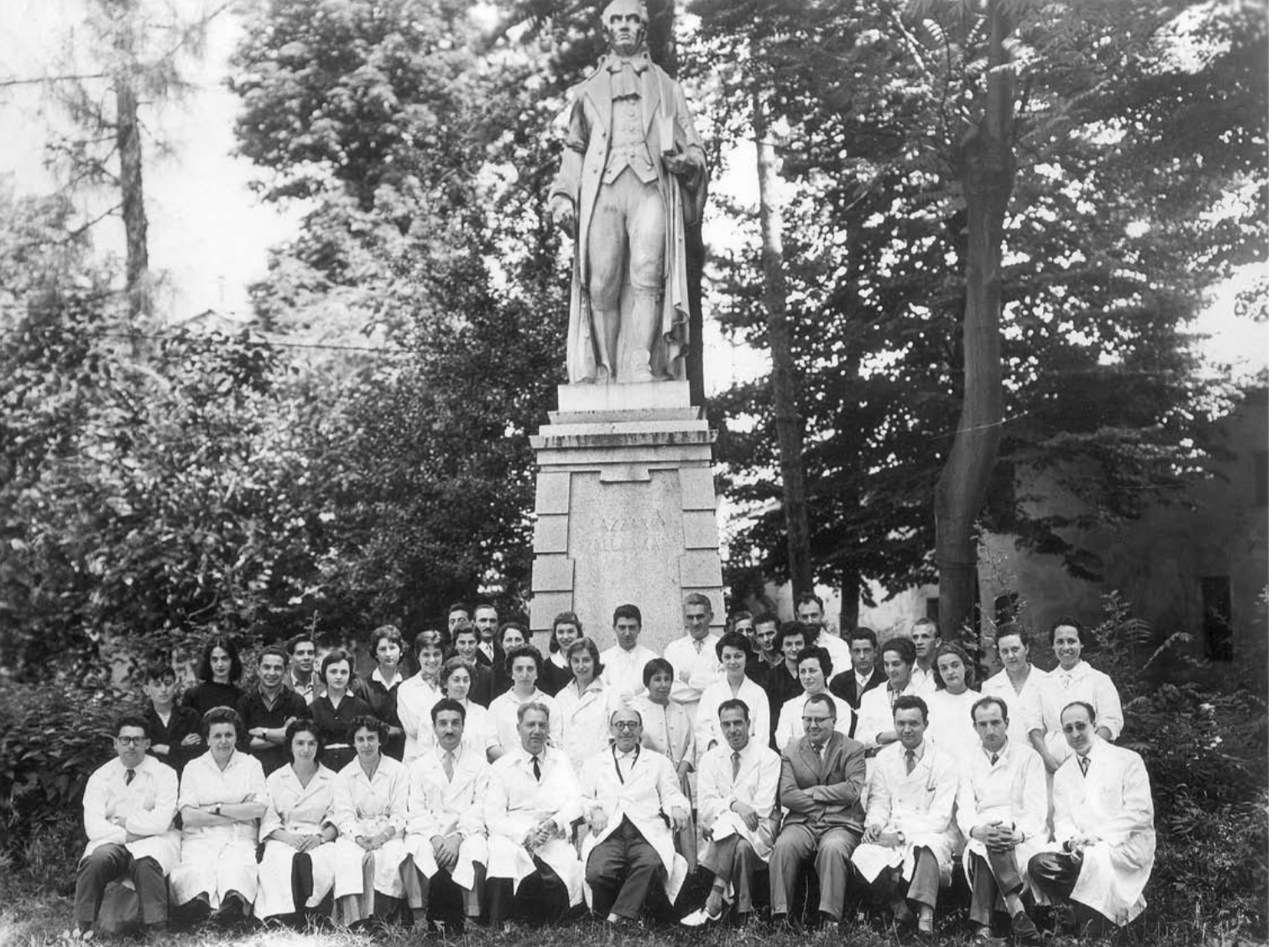
June 1957. Professor Jucci with his collaborators on his 60th birthday.

He began research on the development of the Bombyx mori by using a comparative physiological method. It was represented by a curve that highlighted the metabolic aspects both in the univoltine breeds, (whose egg develops only after a pause, so that a single generation lives within a year) and in the bi and polyvoltine, (whose egg hatches as soon as it is laid with a sequence of two or more generations in the year), showing that with a different metabolism the growth would be less, meaning passing from univoltine to polyvoltines. He was able to demonstrate that polyvoltinism is a common feature, that the metabolic capacities can vary depending on the ability of the insect to react to the external environment, and that there are many degrees of transition between uni, bi, and polyvoltinism.

Studying the bivoltinism and the tendency of the fertilized egg to direct development, without pauses, Jucci investigated the existence in the silkworm of natural parthenogenesis. He compared various races to highlight the degree of tendency to parthenogenetic development and to understand if these differences correspond to an uninterrupted development. The tendency to parthenogenesis has been related to the metabolic reactivity and capacity of race and individual since he found a proportionality between the two events. The inheritance of physiological characters in development is developed in the memoir on The hereditary behavior of a physiological character in the silkworm (in Bull. Of the Italian Entomological Society, LVIII [1926], 4-5, pp. 36–63). He related the different colors of the cocoon, linked to the color of the hemolymph, to the metabolism in the different breeds of silkworms.

By studying the transmission of the colors in different races, he understood that the emergence of a character derives from cellular biochemical processes, as the cocoon’s color that is related to the permeability to certain substances present in food.

Through On the pigments of blood, cocoons and eggs in silkworms (in Rend. Dell'Acc. Dei Lincei, class of physical sciences, s. 6, XI [1930], pp. 86–90) and a comparative examination between two races, he found that even the early or late moment of the migration of the pigment from the blood to the cocoon is following Mendel’s Laws. With the work On the color of the cocoon and migration, he provided the answer to the question about the dominance or recessiveness of genotypic characteristics in the first generation.

In his book Maternal inheritance studied in the characteristics of silkworms (in Rivista di zootechnical, II 1925, 5, pp. 15–23), after many experiments, he criticized the existence of an inheritance linked to the cytoplasm debated by among the geneticists.

With his later studies in Naples, he highlighted the high degree of natural immunity present in the moth of the hives against acid-resistant bacteria, because of digestive enzymes of the wax and the presence in the intestine of caterpillars. After that, he tried to provoke the same resistance in other animals with a waxy substances diet. In the following years, he expanded his participation in international scientific events and through the research centers he founded he could deepen his investigation.
