= Anna Foà =

Italian entomologist (1876–1944)

Anna Foà (16 January 1876 – 1/2 July 1944) was an Italian entomologist.

Foà was born in Rome on 16 January 1876. She studied under Giovanni Battista Grassi at the Sapienza University of Rome, where she graduated with a thesis on sexual dimorphism in mites. Foà's scientific publications were typically through in-house journals and co-authored with Grassi, with whom she published a study on flagellate structure and reproduction in 1904. In 1905, Foà began working as an entomologist at the Royal Antiphiloxeric Observatory in Fauglia, where she worked with Grassi to study ways to combat phylloxera infestations by exploiting the insect's reproductive cycle. Foà, in collaboration with Grassi and other collaborators, published their findings on various phylloxerine species in 1912, which included the description of four new species.

Foà worked as Grassi's research assistant and teaching assistant for over 25 years. While working in Fauglia, Foà was influential in promoting entomology among women, as she supervised the mixed-sex undergraduates instructed by Grassi. In 1917, Foà began working for the Italian government to oversee the import and export of plants. Beginning in 1918, Foà shifted the focus of her research to silkworms and infections caused in silkworms by Nosema bombycis. Grassi's support of her allowed for Foà to work as a professor despite being a woman. In 1921, she began teaching at the Royal Agricultural School in Portici, and she received academic tenure in 1924. As of 1931, she was one of only four woman professors in Italy, and the only one besides Rina Monti to have tenure. Due to her Jewish heritage, Foà was forced to leave her position in academia following the implementation of the Italian racial laws of 1938. Foà died on 1 July or 2 July, 1944.
