= Evolution of eusociality =

Origins of cooperative brood care

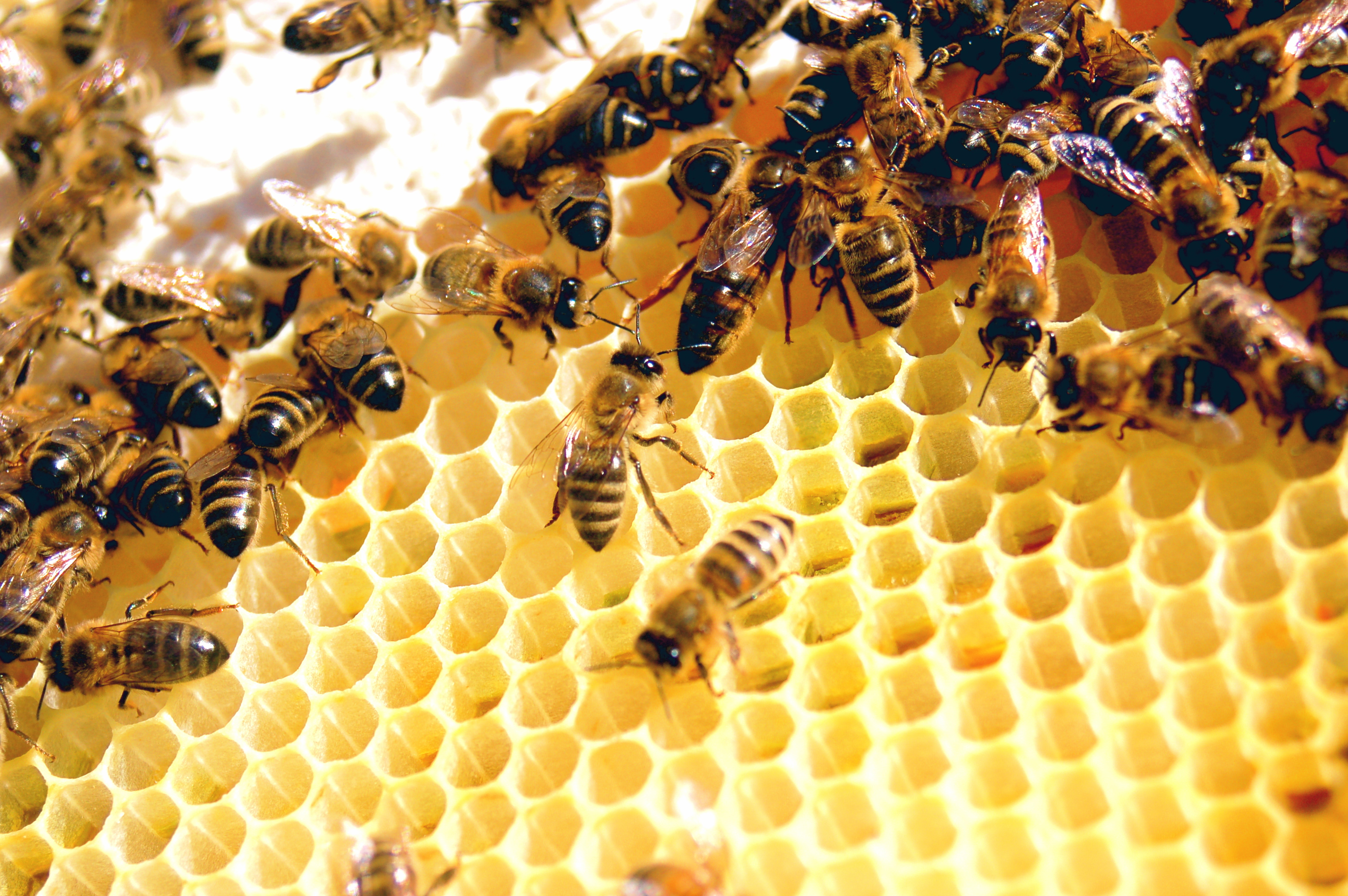
Honeybee workers collaborating on a comb have given up their ability to reproduce, an extreme expression of eusocial behavior.

Eusociality evolved repeatedly in different orders of animals, notably termites and the Hymenoptera (the wasps, bees, and ants). This 'true sociality' in animals, in which sterile individuals work to further the reproductive success of others, is found in termites, ambrosia beetles, gall-dwelling aphids, thrips, marine sponge-dwelling shrimp (Synalpheus regalis), and many genera in the insect order Hymenoptera. The fact that eusociality has evolved so often in the Hymenoptera (between 8 and 11 times), but remains rare throughout the rest of the animal kingdom, has made its evolution a topic of debate among evolutionary biologists. Eusocial organisms at first appear to behave in stark contrast with simple interpretations of Darwinian evolution: passing on one's genes to the next generation, or fitness, is a central idea in evolutionary biology.

Current theories propose that the evolution of eusociality occurred either due to kin selection, proposed by W. D. Hamilton, or by the competing theory of multilevel selection as proposed by E.O. Wilson and colleagues. No single trait or model is sufficient to explain the evolution of eusociality, and most likely the pathway to eusociality involved a combination of pre-conditions, ecological factors, and genetic influences.

== Overview of eusociality ==
Eusociality can be characterized by four main criteria: overlapping generations, cooperative brood care, philopatry, and reproductive altruism. Overlapping generations means that multiple generations live together, and that older offspring may help the parents raise their siblings. Cooperative brood care is when individuals other than the parents assist in raising the offspring through means such as food gathering and protection. Philopatry is when individuals remain living in their birthplace.

The final category, reproductive altruism, is the most divergent from other social orders. Altruism occurs when an individual performs a behavior that benefits a recipient in some way, but at the individual's own expense. Reproductive altruism is one of the most extreme forms of altruism. This is when most members of the group give up their own breeding opportunities in order to participate in the reproductive success of other individuals. The individuals giving up their own reproductive success form a sterile caste of workers within the group. All species that practice reproductive altruism produce one or more queens, the only breeding females, who are larger than the rest. The remainder of the society is composed of a few breeding males, sterile male and female workers, and the young.

== Early hypotheses ==
Charles Darwin considered the evolution of eusociality a major problem for his theory of natural selection. In The Origin of Species, he described the existence of sterile worker castes in the social insects as "the one special difficulty, which at first appeared to me insuperable and actually fatal to my whole theory". In the next paragraph of his book, Darwin describes a solution. If the trait of sterility can be carried by some individuals without expression, and those individuals that do express sterility help reproductive relatives, the sterile trait can persist and evolve.

Darwin was on the right track, except sterility is not a characteristic shared among all eusocial animals. Sterile workers of many eusocial species are not actually physiologically sterile. Male workers can still produce sperm, and female workers sometimes lay eggs, and in some species, become the new queen if the old one dies (observed in Hymenoptera, termites, and shrimp).

This insight led to inclusive fitness and kin selection becoming important theories during the 20th century to help explain eusociality. Inclusive fitness is described as a combination of one's own reproductive success and the reproductive success of others that share similar genes. Animals may increase their inclusive fitness through kin selection. Kin selection is when individuals help close relatives with their reproduction process, seemingly because relatives will propagate some of the individual's own genes. Kin selection follows Hamilton's Rule, which suggests that if the benefit of a behavior to a recipient, taking into account the genetic relatedness of the recipient to the altruist, outweighs the costs of the behavior to the altruist, then it is in the altruist's genetic advantage to perform the altruistic behavior.

== Current theories ==
=== Haplodiploidy/Kin selection ===
William D. Hamilton proposed that eusociality arose in social Hymenoptera by kin selection because of their interesting genetic sex determination trait of haplodiploidy. Because males are produced by parthenogenesis (they come from unfertilized eggs and thus only have one set of chromosomes), and females are produced from fertilized eggs, sisters from a singly-mated mother share (on average) 75% of their genes, whereas mothers always share only 50% of their genes with their offspring. Thus, sisters will propagate their own genes more by helping their mothers to raise more sisters, than to leave the nest and raise their own daughters.

Though Hamilton's argument appears to work well for Hymenoptera, it excludes diploid eusocial organisms (inter-sibling relatedness ≤ parent-offspring relatedness = 0.5). Even in haplodiploid systems, the average relatedness between sisters falls off rapidly when a queen mates with multiple males (r=0.5 for 2 mates, and even lower for more). Moreover, males share only 25% of their sisters' genes, and, in cases of equal sex ratios, females are related to their siblings on average by 0.5 which is no better than raising their own offspring. However, despite the shortcomings of the haplodiploidy hypothesis, it is still considered to have some importance. For example, many bees have female-biased sex ratios and/or invest less in or kill males. Analysis has shown that in Hymenoptera, the ancestral female was monogamous in each of the eight independent cases where eusociality evolved. This indicates that the high relatedness between sisters favored the evolution of eusociality during the initial stages on several occasions. This helps explain the abundance of eusocial genera within the order Hymenoptera, including three separate origins within halictid bees alone.

=== Monogamy ===
The monogamy hypothesis, formulated by Jacobus Boomsma in 2007, is currently the leading hypothesis concerning the initial evolution of eusociality in the Hymenoptera. It uses Hamilton's kin selection approach in a way that applies to both haploid and diploid organisms. If a queen is lifetime-strictly monogamous - in other words, she mates with only one individual during her entire life - her progeny will be equally related to their siblings and to their own offspring (r=0.5 in both cases - this is an average of sisters [0.75] and brothers [0.25]). Thus, natural selection will favor cooperation in any situation where it is more efficient to raise siblings than offspring, and this could start paving a path towards eusociality. This higher efficiency becomes especially pronounced after group living evolves.

In many monogamous animals, an individual's death prompts its partner to look for a new mate, which would affect relatedness and hinder the evolution of eusociality: workers would be much more related to their offspring than their siblings. However, many Hymenoptera have a form of lifetime monogamy in which the queen mates with a single male, who then dies before colony founding. This seems to be the ancestral state in all Hymenopteran lineages that have evolved eusociality. Most termites also have a mating system in which a reproductive female (the queen) commits to a single male for life (the king), and this pattern seems to be ancestral in termites. Lastly, strict monogamy facilitated eusociality in the sponge-dwelling shrimp.

=== Inbreeding ===
In species where philopatry predominates, and there are few emigrants to the nest, intense inbreeding can occur, as is the case in eusocial species. Inbreeding can mimic and even surpass the effects of haplodiploidy. Siblings may actually share greater than 75% of their genes. Like in haplodiploidy kin selection, the individuals can propagate their own genes more through the promotion of more siblings, rather than their own offspring. For example, the need for dispersal and aggregation of multiclonal groups may have helped to drive the evolution of eusociality in aphids.

=== Termites ===
In termites, two additional hypotheses have been proposed. The first is the Chromosomal Linkage Hypothesis, where much of the termite genome is sex-linked. This makes sisters related somewhat above 50%, and brothers somewhat above 50%, but brother-sister relatedness less than 50%. Termite workers might then bias their cooperative brood care towards their own sex. This hypothesis also mimics the effects of haplodiploidy, but proposes that males would help raise only the queen's male offspring, while females would only care for the queen's female offspring.

The symbiont hypothesis in termites is quite different from the others. With each molt, termites lose the lining of their hindgut and the subsequent bacteria and protozoa that colonize their guts for cellulose digestion. They depend on interactions with other termites for their gut to be recolonized, thus forcing them to become social. This could be a precursor, or pre-condition for why eusociality evolved in termites.

=== Pre-conditions ===
The accumulation of certain traits may serve as "pre-conditions" for the evolution of eusociality to more likely occur in certain species. Eusociality is likely to be a trait arising from convergent evolution, considering the lack of evolutionary relationships between the species that have evolved eusociality. However, eusociality is especially concentrated in the order Isoptera (termites), where all members are eusocial, most species of the Formicidae family (ants), and multiple species of the superfamily Apoidea (bees and wasps). Although the symbiont hypothesis serves as a pre-condition for termites to evolve into eusocial societies, scientists have found two crucial pre-conditions for the evolution of eusociality across all species. These include: 1. Altricial offspring (require large amounts of parental care to reach maturity); 2. Low reproductive success rates of solitary pairs that attempt to reproduce. These pre-conditions led to the two lifestyle characteristics that are observed in all eusocial species: nest building and extensive parental care. Experimental evidence for this can be seen in certain studies where species from genus of solitary bees, such as Lasioglossum, may behave like eusocial bees with the division of labor when forced together experimentally. Recent phylogenetic studies have shown that termites are closely related to wood-eating cockroaches (genus Cryptocercus), which are subsocial and engage in biparental care. Thus the eusociality of termites might have evolved from subsocialty.

=== Ecological factors ===
Ecological factors were also probably a precursor to eusociality. For example, the sponge-dwelling shrimp depend upon the sponge's feeding current for food, termites depend upon dead, decaying wood, and naked mole rats depend upon tubers in the ground. Each of these resources has patchy distributions throughout the environments of these animals. This means there is a high cost to dispersing (individual may not find another source before it starves), and these resources must be defended for the group to survive. These requirements make it a necessity to have high social order for the survival of the group.

=== Genetic influences ===
Genetic constraints may have influenced the evolution of eusociality. The genome structure of the order Hymenoptera has been found to have the highest recombination rates of any other groups in Animalia. The eusocial genus Apis, the honeybees, have the highest recombination rate in higher eukaryotes. Genes determining worker behavior and division of labor have been found in regions of the Apis genome with the highest rates of recombination and molecular evolution. These mechanisms are likely important to the evolution of eusociality because high recombination rates are associated with the creation of novel genes, upon which natural selection can act. This could have been important in other eusocial genera. Biased gene conversion rates are also higher in eusocial species. This could increase genotypic diversity, which could allow workers to meet the demands of a changing social structure more easily. Another hypothesis is that the lower overall genetic diversity as eusociality levels increase throughout the family Apidaeis due to a decreased exposure to parasites and pathogens.

== Mechanisms ==
=== Manipulation ===
Eusociality appears to be maintained through manipulation of the sterile workers by the queen. The mechanisms for this include hormonal control through pheromones, restricting food to young in order to control their size, consumption of any eggs laid by females other than the queen, and behavioral dominance. In naked mole rats, this behavioral dominance occurs in the form of the queen facing the worker head-to-head, and shoving it throughout the tunnels of the naked mole rats' burrow for quite a distance.

=== Group selection ===
Nowak, et al. (2010) outlines a path by which eusociality could evolve by means of multi-level (group) selection in five steps:

1. Formation of groups: Groups could consist of parent-offspring groups or unrelated groups (in situations where cooperation is beneficial) living in a structured nest.
2. Pre-adaptations: Pre-adaptations for social living, such as progressive provisioning, will push the group further toward eusociality.
3. Mutations: Mutations will arise and be selected. Some genes are known to have been silenced in social insect history, leading to the reduction of dispersal behavior and the origin of the wingless caste.
4. Natural Selection Acts on Emergent Traits: The interactions of the individuals can be considered as part of the extended phenotype of the queen. These interactions produce emergent properties upon which natural selection can act.
5. Multi-level selection: More cooperative groups out-compete less cooperative groups.

Nowak's paper, however, received major criticisms for erroneously separating inclusive fitness theory from "standard natural selection". Over 150 authors replied arguing that Nowak, et al. misrepresent 40 years of empirical literature.
