= Jacobus Boomsma =

Dutch evolutionary biologist

- Born: Jacobus Jan Boomsma; 1951 (age 74–75)

Academic background
- Education: Vrije Universiteit Amsterdam (MSc, PhD)

Academic work
- Discipline: Biology
- Sub-discipline: Evolutionary biology
- Institutions: University of Copenhagen

Jacobus Jan "Koos" Boomsma (born 1951) is a Dutch evolutionary biologist who studies social evolution and the evolution of mating systems.

== Education ==
Boomsma obtained an MSc and PhD degree in biology in 1976 and 1982 at the Vrije Universiteit Amsterdam.

== Career ==
Boomsma directs the Centre of Social Evolution and works as a professor of biology at the University of Copenhagen. He had done important work on ants of the genus Atta. He is known most recently for the monogamy hypothesis, which states that strict lifetime monogamy enabled the evolution of eusociality in the Hymenoptera (bees, ants, wasps, etc.). He has also lent influential contributions to the fields of mutualisms and sexual conflict and heads research programmes in evolutionary medicine, invasive social syndromes and fungal agriculture. He is a research associate at the Smithsonian Tropical Research Institute in Panama.
