= Rina Monti =

Italian zoologist, biologist

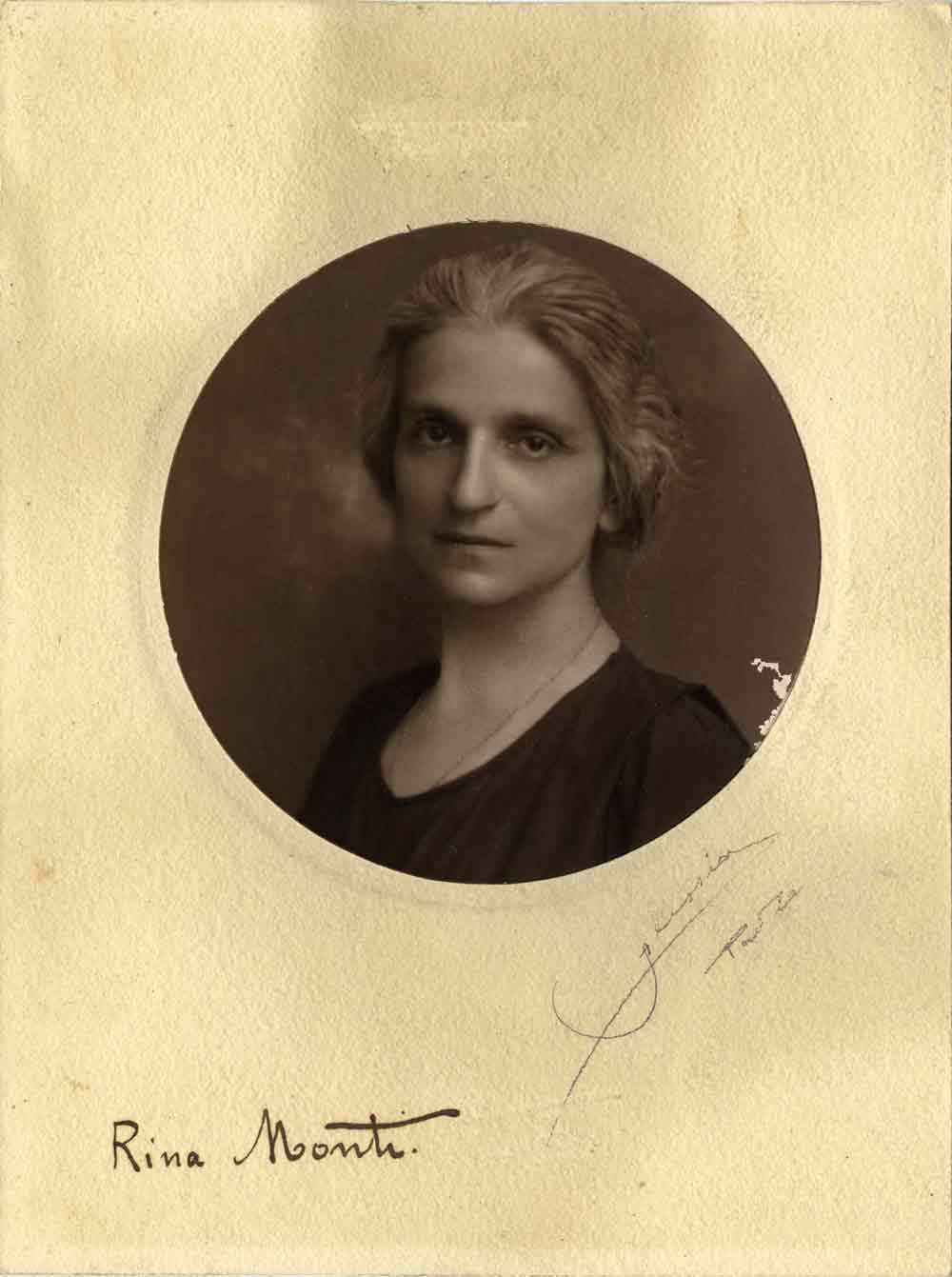
- Born: Cesarina Monti; 16 August 1871; Arcisate, Italy
- Died: 25 January 1937 (aged 65); Pavia, Italy
- Other name: Rina Monti Stella
- Education: University of Pavia (1892)
- Occupation: Zoologist
- Known for: First Italian woman to obtain a university chair
- Spouse: Augusto Stella
- Children: 2 daughters

Cesarina Monti, better known as Rina Monti and, sometimes, as Rina Monti Stella (Arcisate, 16 August 1871 – Pavia, 25 January 1937), was an Italian scientist. A biologist, physiologist, limnologist and zoologist, in 1907 she became the first woman to obtain a university chair in the Kingdom of Italy.

== Biography ==
Monti was born 16 August 1871 in Arcisate, Italy to Francesco Monti, a magistrate, and Luigia Mapelli. After moving to Monza, she graduated from the Alessandro Manzoni high school in 1887.

Monti graduated in natural sciences, after studying the nervous system of insects, from the University of Pavia in 1892, where she worked for a decade. By doing so, she renounced the high school teaching posts typically accepted by educated women of her time, choosing instead to continue her research at the university level.

=== University work ===
Beginning in 1891 Monti frequented the renowned neuro-histology laboratory of Camillo Golgi where she learned his pioneering microscopic techniques. In 1906, Golgi was named a Nobel Prize winner.

Monti's first job was working for the University of Pavia's chair of mineralogy Francesco Sansoni; she published three papers on petrography in his journal. Then she became assistant to Leopoldo Maggi director of the comparative anatomy cabinet, and later she replaced him in that position from 1902 to 1905, as teacher and cabinet director. Meanwhile she obtained the title she needed to be allowed to teach anatomy and comparative physiology (1899).

In 1905 she taught zoology and comparative anatomy at the University of Siena on a temporary assignment and, during this time, she repeatedly competed to be named to a university professorship but was denied several times. These events led Monti, in 1906, to write,

I have little hope to receive a professorship. In general, the Italian authorities are not very inclined to consider the scientific performances of women of equal value to those of men.

Two years later, in another competition involving 18 academic candidates, she was named chair of the department at the University of Sassari, which made the 36-year-old Rina Monti the first woman to obtain a university chair in the history of the Kingdom of Italy. In 1910, at the same university, she was finally appointed a tenured professor.

In 1915 she returned to the University of Pavia, to occupy the chair of zoology and, later, that of comparative anatomy. She held these positions until 1924, when she was invited to the newly formed University of Milan, where she held the chair of comparative anatomy and physiology, while also taking courses in general biology and zoology in the medical school.

Despite her intense research activity and frequent university trips, Monti lived a vibrant private life. From her marriage to Augusto Stella (1863–1944), geologist and professor of mining sciences, she had two daughters, one of which, Emilia Stella (1909–1994), became a well-known limnology researcher.

=== Scientific activity ===
In Pavia, at the beginning of her career, Monti made a name for herself in the zoo-neuro-histological field, with new research on the nervous system of insects. Subsequently she turned to hydrobiology, which at the time was neither very popular nor understood in Italy. In particular, she used a comparative perspective (incorporating mineralogy, zoology, anatomy and microbiology) to study the life of inland lakes (limnology).

To study the varieties of life found in alpine lakes, as well as in insubric lakes, she combined field research and complex laboratory analyses, paying particular attention to the lakes in the Italian mountains of Val d'Aosta and Val d'Ossola first, then of Trentino. To explore the mountain waterways, Monti took on demanding mountaineering excursions: camping on the shores of the lakes, traveling the waters with a special boat, the Pavesia, that was designed and built for her, and using nets of her own invention to collect specimens.

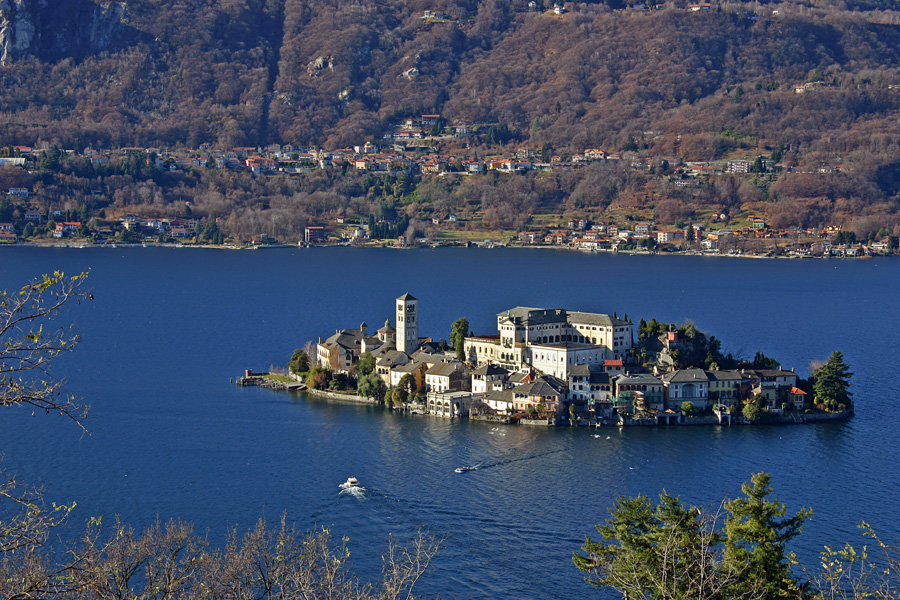
View of Lake Orta in 2007.

Monti also documented the extinction of life in Lake Orta resulting from pollution caused by industrial waste, emphasizing the need to respect the ecological balance.

=== Last years ===
Monti dedicated her last few years to the Trentino lakes, aided by her daughter, Emilia Stella. Together they studied Lake Molveno (1934) and did a genetic study on cladocera (water fleas) (1936).

In 1936, "on the instructions of the Ministry, she was placed in retirement." Monti died a few months later on 25 January 1937 in Pavia.

Because of her initial findings, the study of limnology grew in Italy under the tutelage of her students, and since 1938 has been the subject of the Institute of Hydrobiology, founded in Pallanza.

=== Tributes ===
- Lake Monti, a permanently frozen lake in the Terra Nova bay, discovered in Antarctica in 1988, during an Italian scientific expedition, is dedicated to Rina Monti.
- Via "Rina Monti Stella," a road in the northwestern area of Pavia, was named for her in In 2013.
- The Italian Institute of Hydrobiology in Pallanza, on the shores of Lake Maggiore, was named after her in 2015.

== Memberships ==
Monti was a corresponding member of some of the most prestigious international societies of anatomy of her day: the Royal Lombard Institute of Sciences and Letters in Milan, the Association des Anatomistes in France (since 1998, Association des morphologistes), and the Anatomische Gesellschaft in Germany.

== Selected works ==
According to WorldCat.org, Monti authored 120 works in 184 publications.

=== Journals ===
- Microscopic research on the nervous system of insects. Preliminary note in "Royal Lombard Institute of Sciences and Letters. Reports." Series 2, Volume 25, Fascicolo 7, 1892, pp. 533–540.
- Contribution to the knowledge of the nerves of the digestive tract of fish, Bernardoni, Milan 1895.
- On the nervous system of freshwater dendroceles. Note I, Bizzoni, Pavia 1896.
- On the comparative morphology of the excretory ducts of the gastric glands in vertebrates, Bizzoni, Pavia 1898.
- The salivary glands of terrestrial gastropods in the different functional periods, Hoepli, Milan 1899.
- The regeneration of marine planaria, Hoepli, Milan 1900.
- The physical-biological conditions of the Ossola and Valle d'Aosta lakes in relation to psychulture, Tip. Cooperative, Pavia 1903.
- Thalassographic explorations along the coasts of northern Sardinia, Fusi, Pavia 1910.
- Contribution to the biology of alpine hydrachnids in relation to the environment, Fusi, Pavia 1910.
- The internal reticular apparatus of golgi in the nerve cells of crustaceans, Accademia dei Lincei, Rome 1914.
- Chondriosomes and Golgi systems in nerve cells. Comparative research, Niccolai, Florence 1915.
- The biological physiognomy of Sardinia and the new ideas about the origins and the geographical destruction of the species, Fusi, Pavia 1915.
- The comparative limnology of insubric lakes, L'universale, Rome 1929.
- The battle against the beetles, in "New annals of agriculture." IX (1929), pp. 509–529.
- The gradual extinction of life in Lake Orta, Hoepli, Milan 1930
- The genetics of Italian whitefish and their variability in relation to the environment, Jovene, Naples 1933.
- Contribution to the hydrobiology of the Albanian Alps. Floridia Allegri Mission, Fusi, Pavia 1934.
- Molveno lake. Life in a zootrophic lake, (written with E. Stella), Scotoni, Trento 1934.
- The Daphnia cucullata GO Sars in Tridentine lakes, (with P. Perotti Razzini), Scotoni, Trento 1935.
- Numbers, sizes and volumes of pelagic organisms living in Italian waters, in relation to the lake economy, Hoepli, Milan 1936.

=== Texts ===
- Petrographic studies on some rocks of the Canonica valley, Fusi, Pavia 1894.
- Microscopic research on the nervous system of insects, Bizzoni, Pavia 1894.
- Anatomo-comparative research on the minute innervation of the trophic organs in the lower craniotes, Rosenberg and Sellier, Turin 1898
- The limnology of the Lario in relation to the repopulation of waters and fishing, Luzzatti, Rome 1924.
- The flowering of the waters on the Lario, se, Milan 1925.
- Lessons in comparative anatomy, Mariani, Milan 1927.
- Biology of whitefish in Italian lakes, Istituto Editoriale Scientifico, Milan 1930.
- Zoology and comparative anatomy, 2 vols., Bruni-Martelli, Pavia 1931-1935
