= Insectes Sociaux =

- Discipline: Entomology, eusociality
- Language: English

Publication details
- History: 1954–present
- Publisher: Birkhäuser Verlag (Switzerland)
- Frequency: quarterly

Standard abbreviations
- ISO 4: Insectes Soc.

Indexing
- ISSN: 0020-1812
- OCLC no.: 1753181

Links
- Journal homepage

Insectes sociaux is a scientific journal dedicated to the study of social insects. It is the official journal of the International Union for the Study of Social Insects (IUSSI), and is published by Birkhäuser Verlag.
