= T. C. Schneirla =

American psychologist (1902–1968)

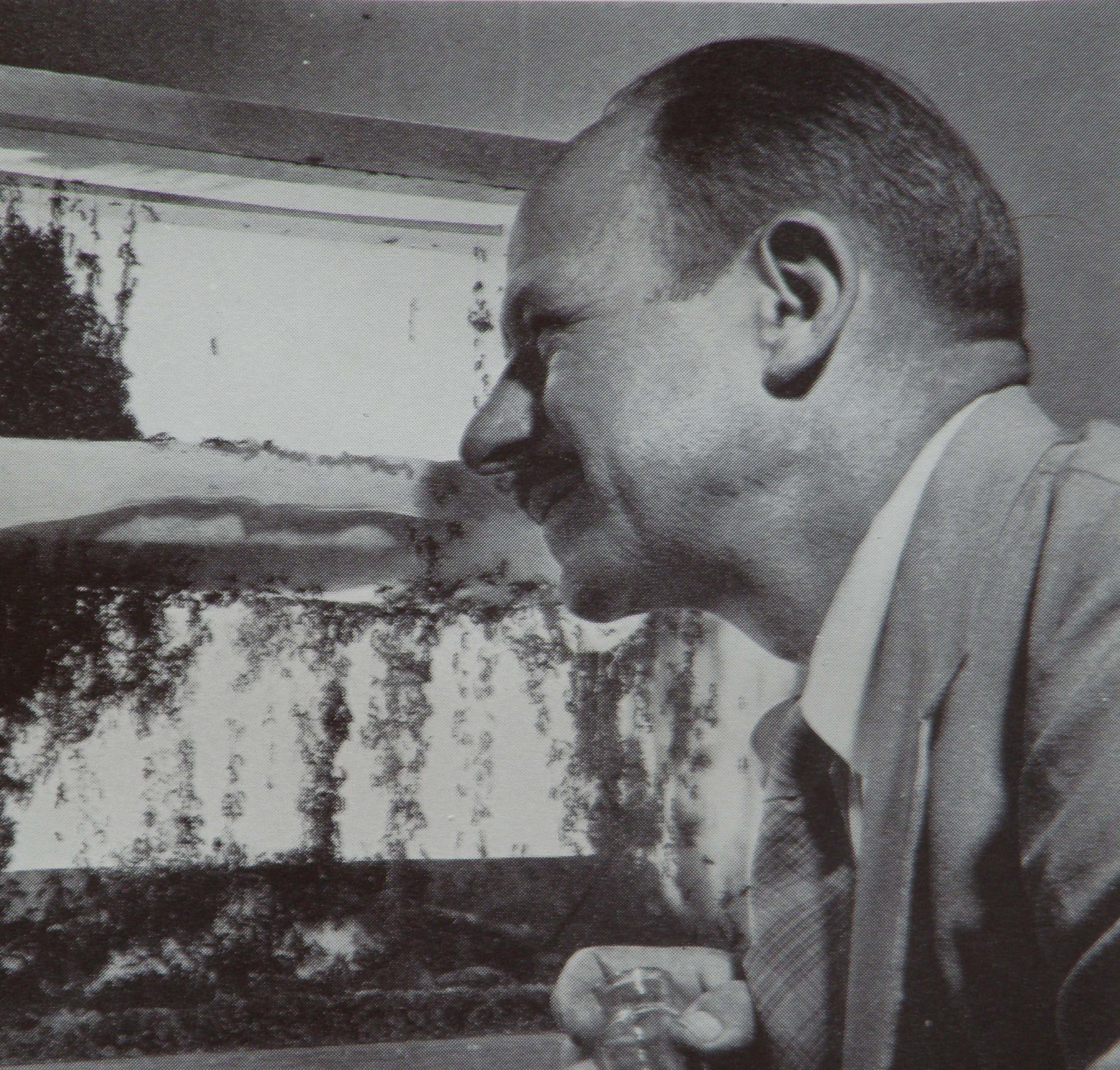
- Born: July 23, 1902; Bay City, Michigan, United States
- Died: August 20, 1968; New York City
- Education: University of Michigan
- Scientific career
- Fields: Biologist
- Workplaces: American Museum of Natural History

Theodore Christian Schneirla (July 23, 1902, Bay City, Michigan — Aug. 20, 1968, New York, N.Y.) was an American animal psychologist who performed some of the first studies on the behavior patterns of army ants.

Schneirla was educated at the University of Michigan, Ann Arbor (M.S., 1925; Sc.D., 1928), and joined the staff of New York University in 1928. He made the first of eight trips to the Barro Colorado Island, Panama Canal Zone, to study the behavior of army ants in 1932. His "Studies on Army Ants in Panama," published the next year, provided new insight into their behavior. He discovered that these ants operate on a 36-day cycle consisting of a 16-day nomadic pattern followed by a 20-day stationary phase. In 1934 he reported that ants follow a particular pattern when moving into new territory and that raids by these insects peak once during the morning and again in the afternoon. Sudden changes in weather also were found to give rise to sudden bursts of activity. In 1944 he showed that their raids were caused by the level of excitability of the ant colony and not by a scarcity of prey.

In 1943 Schneirla became associate curator of the Department of Animal Behavior at the American Museum of Natural History, New York City. After his return from a study of army ants in southern Mexico, he became the full curator of the museum in 1947.

Schneirla was the author of a large number of scientific papers and the coauthor of several books on psychology, including Principles of Animal Psychology (with N.R.F. Maier; 1935) and Recent Experiments in Psychology (with L.W. Crafts; 1938). The concept of integrative levels permeated almost all of his papers. Six of his publications are directly devoted to the application of the concept of integrative levels to comparative psychology and social organization. Schneirla has been noted for his effectiveness in combining the concept of integrative levels with behavioral ontogeny to create a comprehensive theory of how organisms develop during their individual lives and how development changes across evolution. This theory provided a picture of more and more complex developmental processes as we go from lower to higher animal species.

== Books ==
- Maier, N. R. F., Théodore Christian Schneirla, T. C., (1935) "Principles of animal psychology". McGraw-Hill Book Company
- Aronson, L. R., Tobach, E., Rosenblatt, J. S., Lehrman, D. S. (Eds.) (1972) "Selected writings of T. C. Schneirla". Oxford, England: W.H. Freeman & Co.
