= Charles Duncan Michener =

American entomologist (1918–2015)

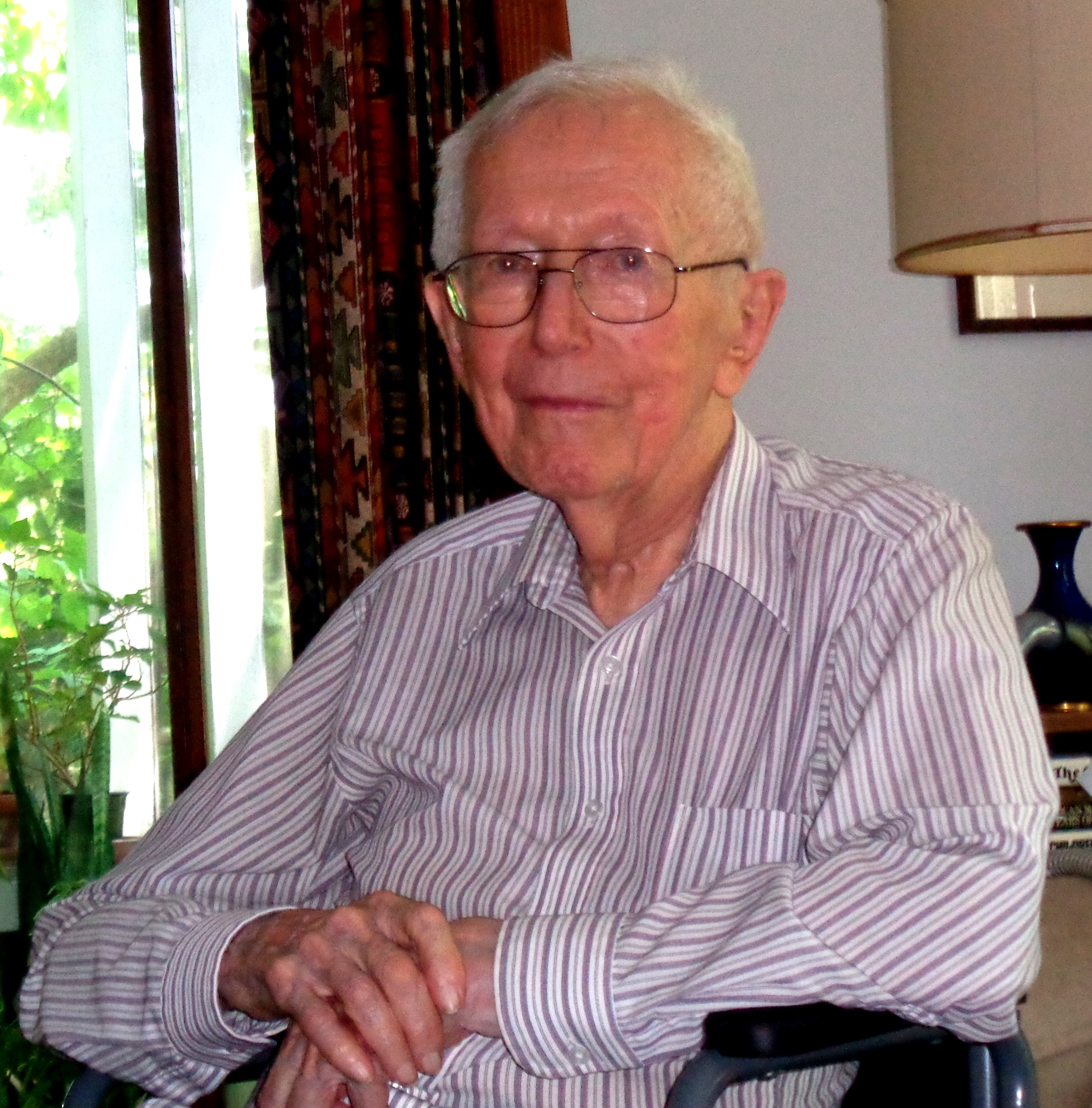
- Charles D. Michener at home, 2015
- Born: September 22, 1918; Pasadena, California, U.S.
- Died: November 1, 2015 (aged 97); Lawrence, Kansas, U.S.
- Education: University of California, Berkeley
- Scientific career
- Fields: Entomology, melittology
- Workplaces: University of Kansas
- Thesis: Comparative External Morphology, Phylogeny, and a Classification of the Bees (1942)
- Doctoral advisor: Edward Oliver Essig
- Doctoral students: Edward M. Barrows, Paul R. Ehrlich

Charles Duncan Michener (September 22, 1918 – November 1, 2015) was an American entomologist born in Pasadena, California. He was a leading expert on bees, his magnum opus being The Bees of the World published in 2000.

== Biography ==
Much of his career was devoted to the systematics and natural history of bees. His first peer-reviewed publication was in 1934, at the age of 16. He received his BS in 1939 and his PhD in entomology in 1941, from the University of California, Berkeley. He remained in California until 1942, when he became an assistant curator of Lepidoptera at the American Museum of Natural History in New York City.

In 1944 he published a classification system for bees that was soon adopted worldwide, and was in use until 1993 and 1995, when he co-authored new classifications. From 1943 to 1946, Michener also served as a first lieutenant and captain in the United States Army Sanitary Corps, where he researched insect-borne diseases, and described the life cycle of the common chigger.

Michener joined the faculty of the University of Kansas in 1948 as associate professor of entomology. He was chairman of the Entomology Department from 1949 to 1961, and then again from 1972 to 1975. He was awarded a John Simon Guggenheim Memorial Fellowship in 1955, and again in 1966. He was awarded the Watkins Distinguished Professor of Entomology in 1958, won a Fulbright Scholarship to Australia in 1958, was elected to the National Academy of Sciences in 1965, and became director of the Snow Entomological Museum (now part of the University of Kansas Natural History Museum, itself now a division within the University of Kansas Biodiversity Institute) in 1974. In February 2001, the Association of American Publishers gave its prestigious R.R. Hawkins Award for the Outstanding Professional Reference or Scholarly Work of 2000 to Michener's opus, The Bees of the World.

Michener's work on social evolution in the Halictidae in the 1960s helped set the stage for the sociobiology revolution of the 1970s, with E. O. Wilson relying to a great degree on Michener's concepts regarding the paths from solitary to highly social life.

Along with his research activities and teaching, Michener was the editor of the academic journals Evolution from 1962 to 1964, the associate editor of the Annual Review of Ecology and Systematics from 1970 to 1985, and the American editor of Insectes Sociaux from 1954 to 1955, again from 1970 to 1985. He served as president of the Kansas Entomological Society in 1950, president of the Society for the Study of Evolution in 1967, president of the Society of Systematic Zoology in 1968, and president of the American Society of Naturalists in 1978. In 1977 he began his term as the president of the International Union for the Study of Social Insects and organized the 9th International Congress in 1982. He is also an honorary member of the Brazilian Academy of Sciences. At the time of his retirement in 1989, Michener had already published over 340 articles and books, primarily on bee systematics and biology; in the same year, a fund was started with the University of Kansas Endowment Association for a scientific lecture series in Michener's name. He continued to publish through 2015.

Michener's long career also included the training of more than 80 master's and doctoral students, among them Jim Baker, Edward M. Barrows, Suzanne W. T. Batra, Michael D. Breed, Denis Brothers, Sydney Cameron, Jim Cane, Paul R. Ehrlich, George Eickwort, Gordon Gordh, Les Greenberg, William Gutierrez, Alexander Hawkins, Dwight Kamm, Robert Minckley, William Ramirez, Radclyffe Roberts, Brian H. Smith, Thomas Snyder, William Wcislo, John Wenzel, Alvaro Wille, and Douglas Yanega.

== Selected bibliography ==
- Sokal, Michener (1958). "A statistical method for evaluating systematic relationships". University of Kansas Science Bulletin. 38: 1409–1438.
- Michener, C. D. (1974). The Social Behavior of the Bees. Harvard University Press. 404 pp.
- Michener, C. D. (2000). The Bees of the World. Johns Hopkins University Press. 913 pp.
