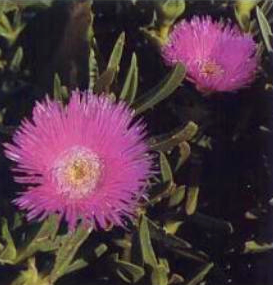

Scientific classification
- Kingdom: Plantae
- Clade: Tracheophytes
- Clade: Angiosperms
- Clade: Eudicots
- Order: Caryophyllales
- Family: Aizoaceae
- Genus: Carpobrotus
- Species: C. dimidiatus

Binomial name
- Carpobrotus dimidiatus (Haw.) L. Bolus

= Carpobrotus dimidiatus =

Natal sourfig

Species of succulent

Carpobrotus dimidiatus (commonly known as Natal sourfig) is a succulent perennial of the family Aizoaceae, native to KwaZulu-Natal, South Africa.

== Description ==
The flowers of C. dimidiatus range bright pink to mauve. The receptacle is turbiniform to "barrel-shaped" (similar to that of C. mellei), and tapers at the bottom into the pedicel. It is also often strongly and distinctively double-ridged. The top of the ovary is slightly raised in the centre.

The leaves are relatively long and thin. The mature leaves are straight (though the very young leaves can be subacinaciform). They have somewhat canaliculate surfaces and are basally connate. In cross-section they can form an approximate equilateral triangle. They are a dull glaucous-green colour.

== Distribution and habitat ==
Their natural habitat is the coast of KwaZulu-Natal, South Africa, also stretching south into the Eastern Cape and north into Mozambique.

In the south or west of its natural range, it transitions into the related species Carpobrotus deliciosus.

Its fruits are edible and are grazed by tortoises and other southern African animals.
