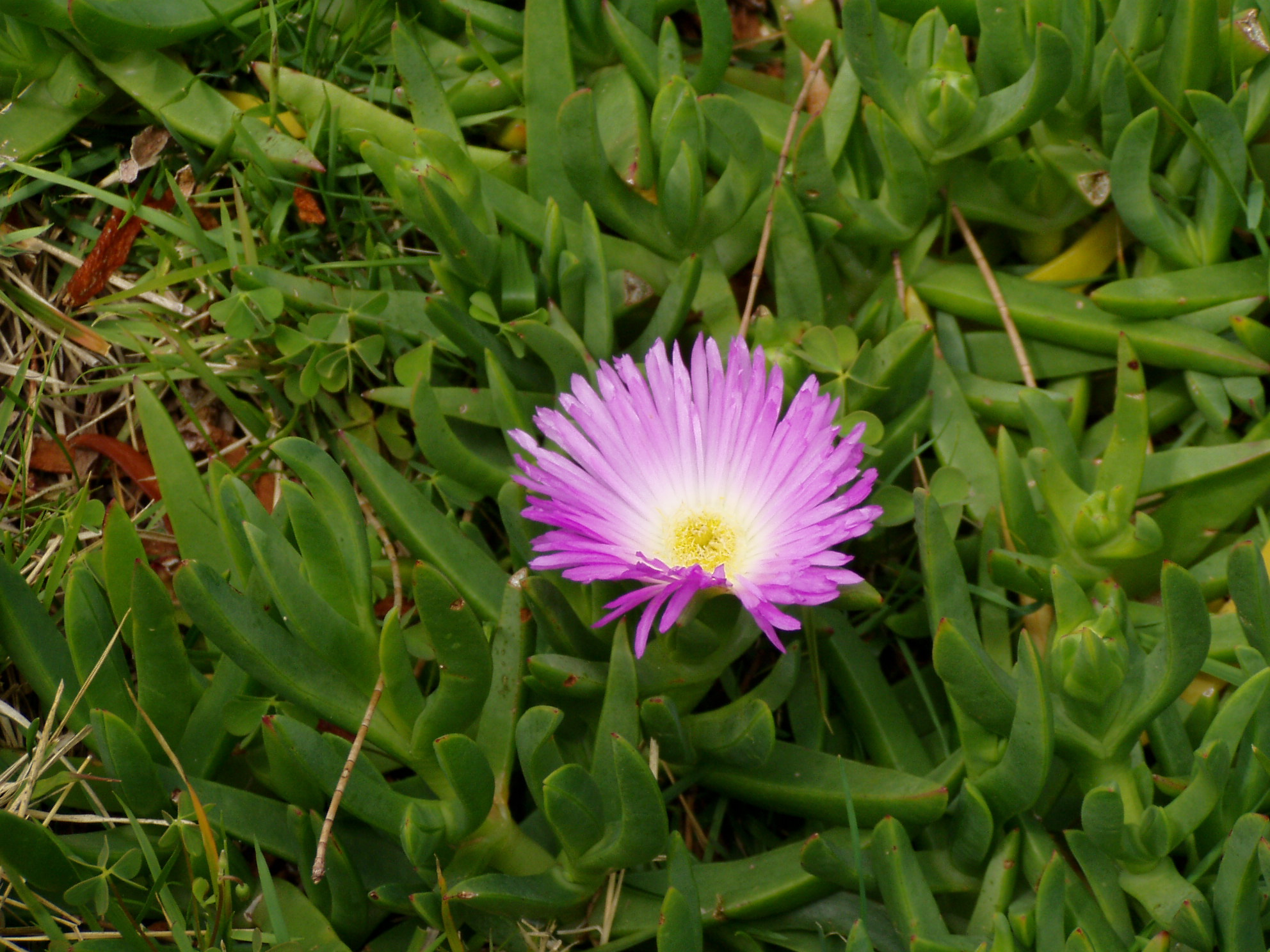

Scientific classification
- Kingdom: Plantae
- Clade: Tracheophytes
- Clade: Angiosperms
- Clade: Eudicots
- Order: Caryophyllales
- Family: Aizoaceae
- Genus: Carpobrotus
- Species: C. glaucescens

Binomial name
- Carpobrotus glaucescens (Haw.) Schwantes

Synonyms
- Carpobrotus glaucescens (Haw.) N.E.Br. isonym; Mesembryanthemum australe Sol. ex G.Forst. nom. inval., nom. nud.; Mesembryanthemum glaucescens Haw.; Mesembryanthemum aequilaterum auct. non Haw.; Mesembryanthemum australe auct. non Aiton

= Carpobrotus glaucescens =

Pigface

Species of succulent

Carpobrotus glaucescens, commonly known as pigface or iceplant, is a species of flowering plant in the family Aizoaceae and is endemic to eastern Australia. It is a succulent, prostrate plant with stems up to 2 m (6 ft 7 in) long, glaucous leaves, daisy-like flowers with 100 to 150 light purple to deep pinkish-purple, petal-like staminodes and red to purple fruit. The fruits ripen mainly in Summer and Autumn. It usually only grows very close to the sea.

== Description ==
Carpobrotus glaucescens is a prostrate plant with stems up to 2 m (6 ft 7 in) long and glaucous leaves that are triangular in cross-section, straight or slightly curved, 35–100 mm (1.4–3.9 in) long and 9–15 mm (0.35–0.59 in) wide. The flowers are superficially daisy-like, more or less sessile, 40–60 mm (1.6–2.4 in) in diameter with 100 to 150 light purple to deep pinkish-purple staminodes arranged in three or four rows and white near the base. There are about 300 to 400 stamens in five or six rows and seven to ten styles. The fruit is red to purple, more or less cylindrical, 20–30 mm (0.79–1.18 in) long and 16–24 mm (0.63–0.94 in) wide.

== Taxonomy ==
Pigface was first formally described in 1812 by Adrian Hardy Haworth who gave it the name Mesembryanthemum glaucescens in his book Synopsis Plantarum Succulentarum, but in 1928, Martin Schwantes changed the name to Carpobrotus glaucescens.

== Distribution and habitat ==
Carpobrotus glaucescens occurs in near-coastal areas of Queensland south from near Mackay to New South Wales and the far east of Victoria where it has been confused with C. rossii. It is also found on Norfolk Island and Lord Howe Island. There is a population on the Coromandel Peninsula in New Zealand but it may be an introduced species there.

== Uses ==
The fruit of C. glaucescens was used by Aboriginal peoples as a food source. The flesh of the fruit is said to have a taste similar to salty apples. The fleshy leaves may be eaten either raw or cooked; roasted, they can be used as a salt substitute. Early European explorers used the plant as an anti-scurvy treatment. The juice of the leaves can also be used to relieve burnt skin or to soothe stings, such as from biting midges or Portuguese man o' war (Physalia physalis).
