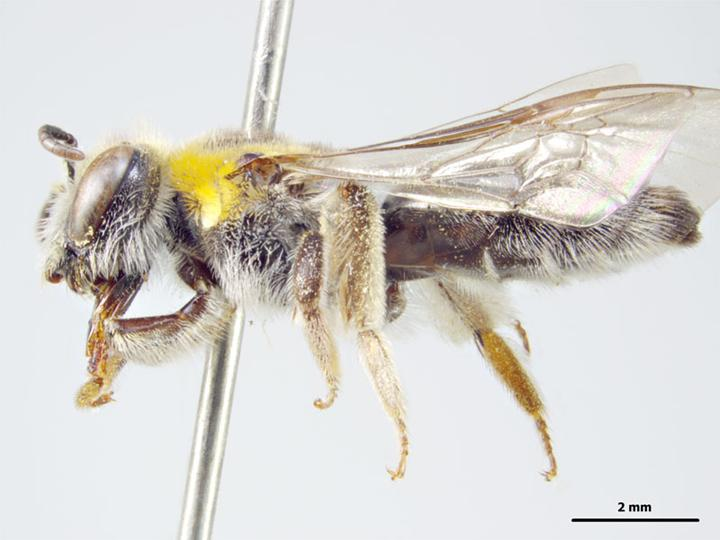
- Female

Scientific classification
- Kingdom: Animalia
- Phylum: Arthropoda
- Clade: Pancrustacea
- Class: Insecta
- Order: Hymenoptera
- Family: Colletidae
- Genus: Leioproctus
- Species: L. leai

Binomial name
- Leioproctus leai (Cockerell, 1913)

Synonyms
- Paracolletes leai Cockerell, 1913; Paracolletes humerosus cyanurus Cockerell, 1914; Paracolletes simillimus Cockerell, 1916; Leioproctus (Leioproctus) simulator Michener, 1965

= Leioproctus leai =

Species of bee

Leioproctus leai, or Leioproctus (Exleycolletes) leai, is a species of bee in the family Colletidae and subfamily Colletinae. It is endemic to Australia. It was described by British-American entomologist Theodore Dru Alison Cockerell in 1913.

== Description ==
Female body length is about 12 mm. Colouration is mainly glossy black, the abdomen metallic, with white and cream to reddish-brown hair.

== Distribution and habitat ==
The species occurs across Australia. Type localities include Ulverstone, Tasmania; Oakleigh, Victoria; and Yallingup, Western Australia.

== Behaviour ==
The adults are flying mellivores. Flowering plants visited by the bees include Bursaria spinosa as well as Carpobrotus, Brassica, Eucalyptus and Melaleuca species.

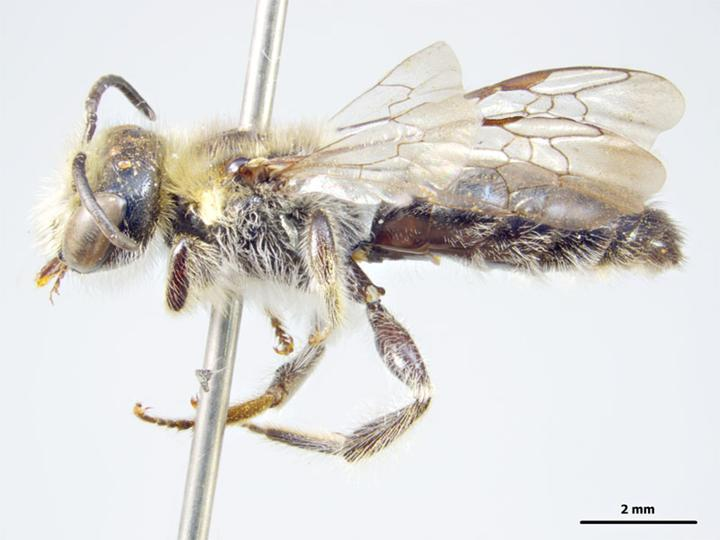
Male
