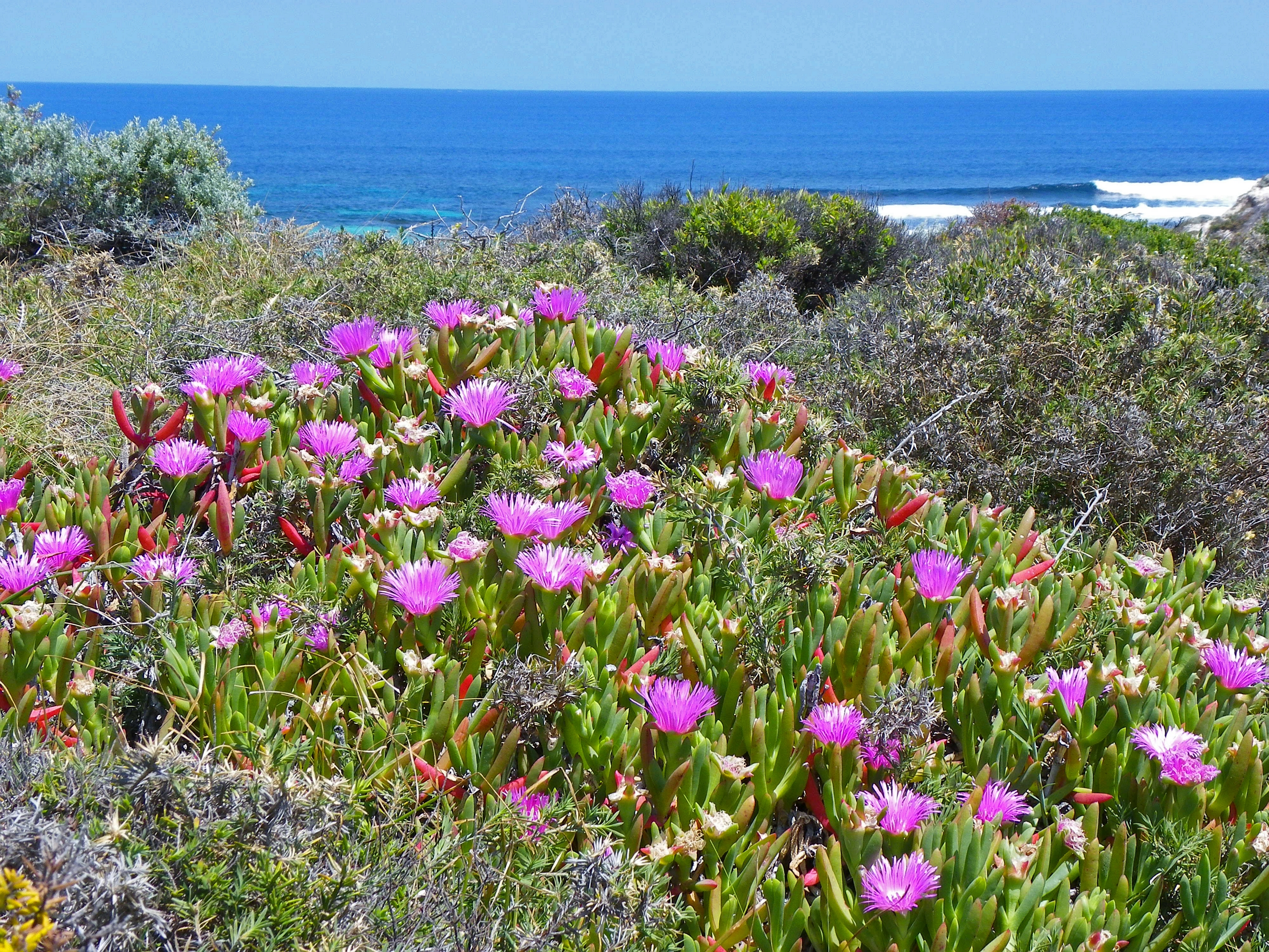
- Carpobrotus virescens on Rottnest Island

Scientific classification
- Kingdom: Plantae
- Clade: Tracheophytes
- Clade: Angiosperms
- Clade: Eudicots
- Order: Caryophyllales
- Family: Aizoaceae
- Genus: Carpobrotus
- Species: C. virescens

Binomial name
- Carpobrotus virescens (Haw.) Schwantes

= Carpobrotus virescens =

Species of plant

Carpobrotus virescens, commonly known as coastal pigface, is a prostrate coastal succulent shrub of the family Aizoaceae native to Western Australia. The Noongar peoples know the plant as Kolbogo or Metjarak.

== Description ==
It is a prostrate plant with stems up to 1.5 metres (5 ft) long. Its leaves are green, from 3.5 to 9 centimetres (1½-3½ in) long, and 9 to 17 millimetres wide. Flowers are from four to six centimetres in diameter, on a pedicel five to 15 millimetres long. They are composed of 250 to 300 stamens, surrounded by petal-like staminodes that are mostly purple, but white at the base.

== Taxonomy ==
It was first published in 1812 by Adrian Hardy Haworth, who gave it the name Mesembryanthemum virescens. Fourteen years later, Haworth published M. abbreviatum; no specimen was given for this name, and a figure on which the name was based is now lost, but on the basis of an 1848 figure this name has been synonymized with C. virescens. Neotypes were designated for both names by Stanley Thatcher Blake in 1969. The neotype of M. abbreviatum is an illustration from Joseph Salm-Reifferscheid-Dyck's Monogr. Aloes et Mesembryanthemi, while that of M. virescens is a specimen of Blake's (Blake 20910; BRI.080355–6) from the Queensland Herbarium. In 1914 the species was demoted to a variety of M. edule (now C. edulis) by Charles Edward Moss, but this was not accepted, and in 1928 Martin Heinrich Gustav Schwantes transferred the species into Carpobrotus as C. virescens.

== Distribution and habitat ==
Endemic to Western Australia, C. virescens occurs on coastal limestone cliffs and dunes from the western edge of the Great Australian Bight, west and north almost to Shark Bay. There is also an outlying collection from North West Cape.
