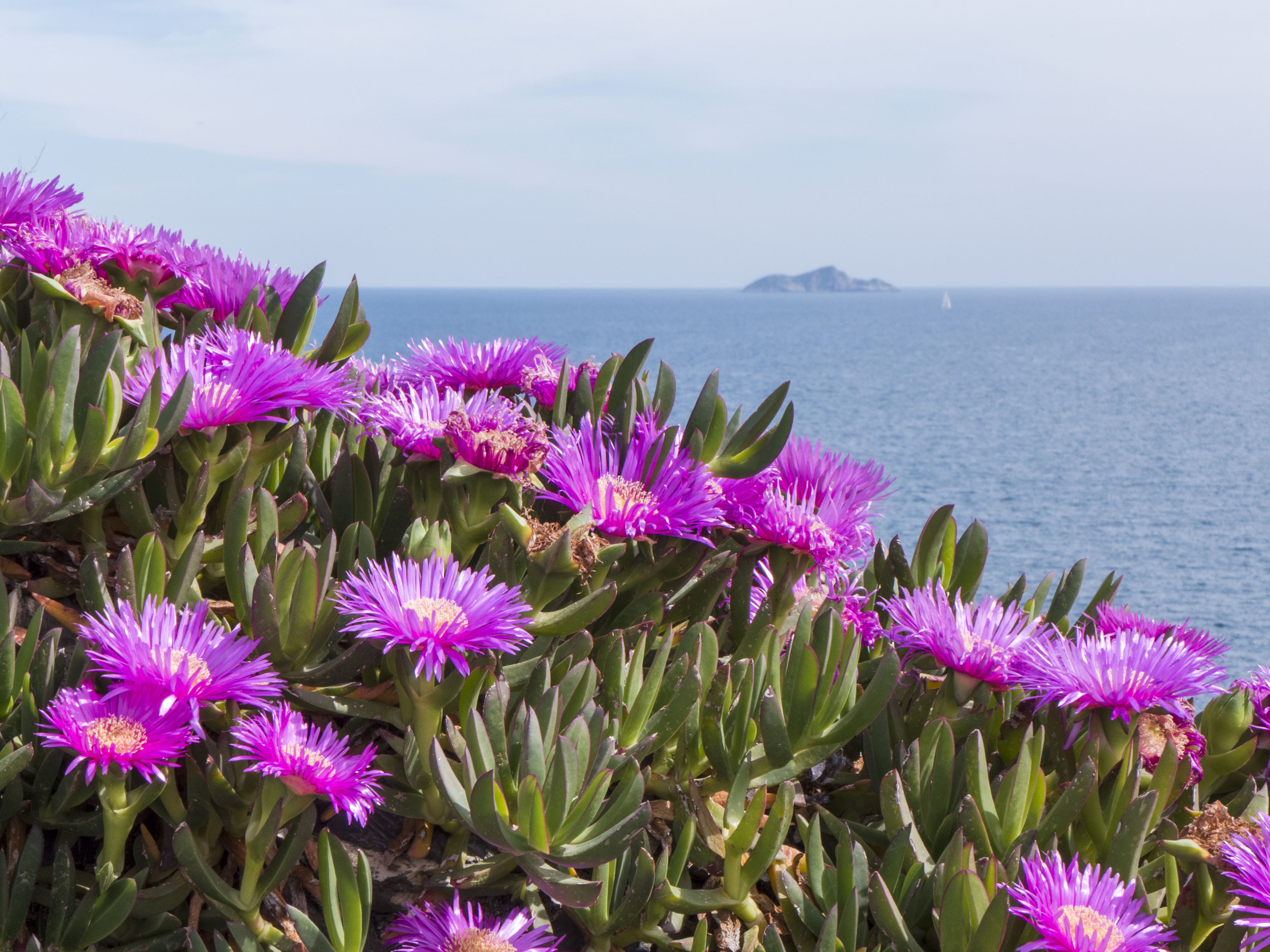

Scientific classification
- Kingdom: Plantae
- Clade: Embryophytes
- Clade: Tracheophytes
- Clade: Spermatophytes
- Clade: Angiosperms
- Clade: Eudicots
- Order: Caryophyllales
- Family: Aizoaceae
- Genus: Carpobrotus
- Species: C. acinaciformis

Binomial name
- Carpobrotus acinaciformis (L.) L. Bolus

= Carpobrotus acinaciformis =

Species of succulent

Carpobrotus acinaciformis (commonly known as Elands sourfig, Elandssuurvy or Sally-my-handsome) is a succulent perennial of the family Aizoaceae, native to South Africa.

== Description ==
All species of Carpobrotus ("sour fig") form sprawling succulent groundcovers.

The flowers of C. acinaciformis are a bright pink-purple colour. The five calyx lobes are all short, and of relatively similar length (unlike those of C. edulis). The receptacle is sub-globose in shape (rarely slightly oblong), tapering only slightly down to where it meets the stalk. The top of the ovary is often slightly depressed in the centre.

The leaves of C. acinaciformis are stout, scimitar-shaped ("acinaciform") and have the shape of an isosceles triangle in cross-section, if cut perpendicularly. They have a dull glaucous-green colour (sometimes with reddish edges or angles).

== Distribution ==
This species is naturally endemic to the Western Cape, South Africa. Its natural habitat is coastal dunes, from as far north as Melkbosstrand, across the Cape Peninsula, and eastwards to near Mossel Bay. It also occurs more rarely (as a more compact form) inland, from Cape Town to as far east as Riversdale.

To the east of its natural range (east of Mossel Bay), it transitions into the related species Carpobrotus deliciosus. To the west or north of its natural range (north of Melkbosstrand in Cape Town), it transitions into the related species Carpobrotus quadrifidus. In Tasmania, Australia, it extends across the NW and central coast areas, concentrated from Port Sorell to Burnie in large edible populations. Also reaching to Hobart, Tasmania and across and into the NZ populations.

It forms a hybrid with C. edulis, Carpobrotus × accedens, which is naturalized in parts of Europe, from Great Britain to Greece.

== Cultivation ==
The pink or purple flowers are very showy and the plant is frequently cultivated, especially in mild coastal climates. Its fruits are edible and are used in southern Africa to make a traditional jam. In the wild they are grazed by tortoises and other southern African herbivores. In some areas, such as the south-west of England, it has become naturalised on sea cliffs and can outcompete native species.

The name "Sally-my-handsome" is derived from its former generic name of Mesembryanthemum.
