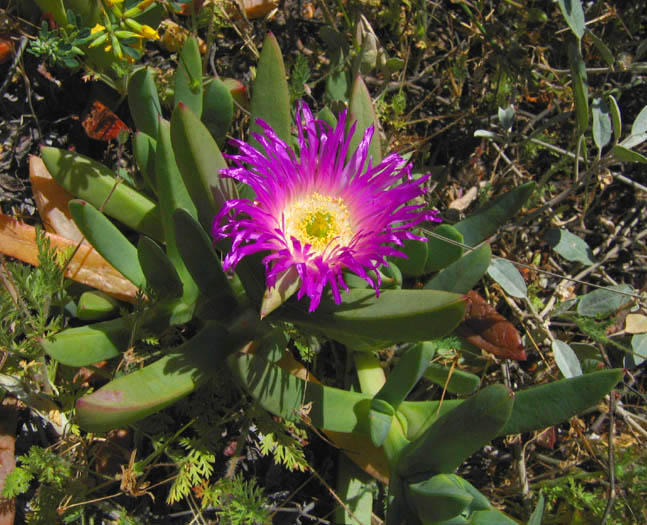

Scientific classification
- Kingdom: Plantae
- Clade: Embryophytes
- Clade: Tracheophytes
- Clade: Spermatophytes
- Clade: Angiosperms
- Clade: Eudicots
- Order: Caryophyllales
- Family: Aizoaceae
- Genus: Carpobrotus
- Species: C. chilensis

Binomial name
- Carpobrotus chilensis (Molina) N.E. Br

Synonyms
- Mesembryanthemum chilense

= Carpobrotus chilensis =

Sea fig

Species of succulent

Carpobrotus chilensis is a species of edible succulent plant known by the common name sea fig. It grows on coastal sand dunes and bluffs and is used as an ornamental plant. However, along with its relative C. edulis, it has invaded sections of the California coast at the expense of native vegetation, and is subject to control efforts.

== Description ==
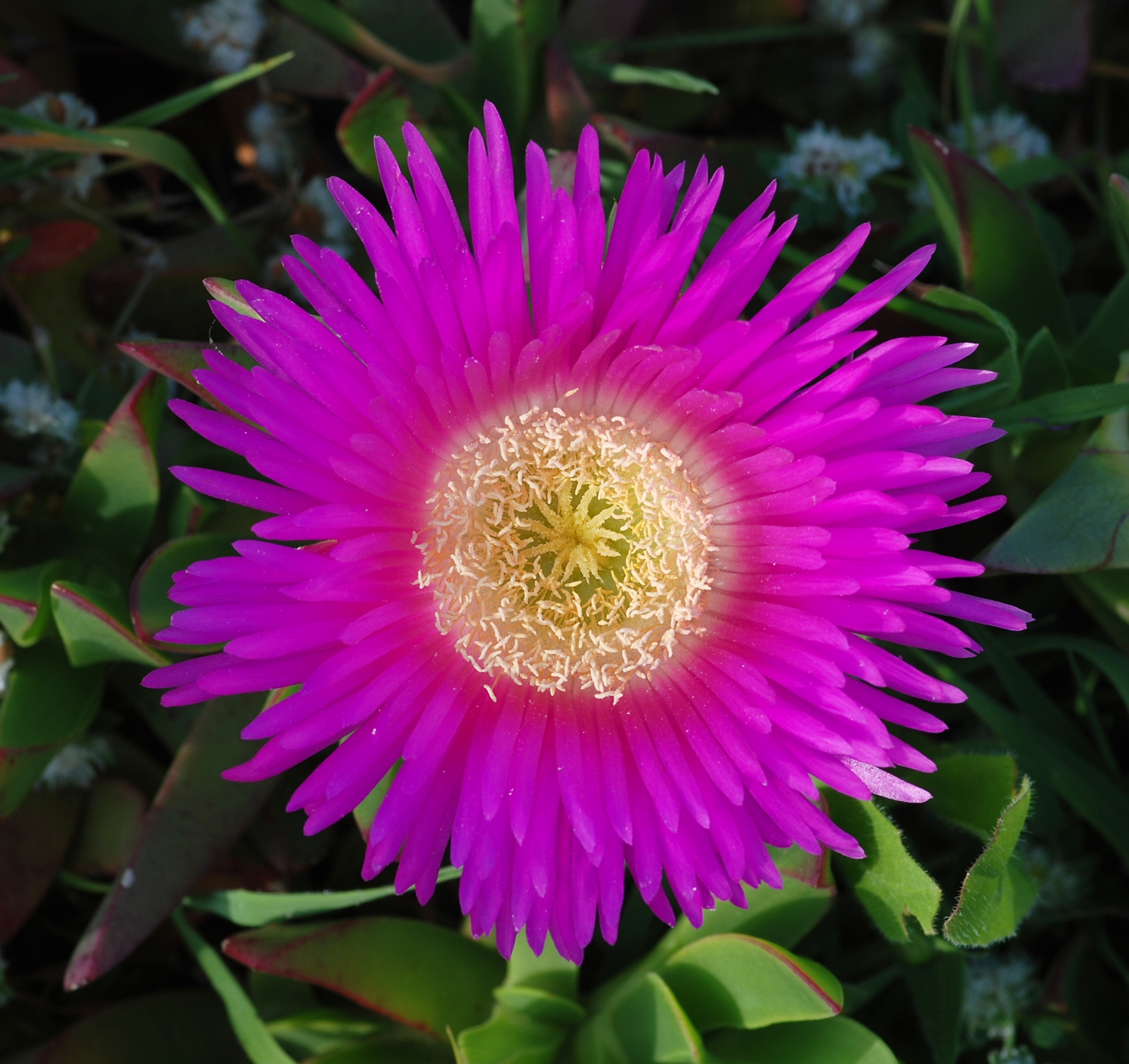
Close-up of flower

Carpobrotus chilensis sends out prostrate stems that are upwards of 2 metres (6 1/2 feet) long; these root at the nodes and can carpet the ground, with fleshy, pointed leaves which are 4–7.5 centimetres (1 1/2–3 inches) long and triangular in cross-section. It is similar to, and often mistaken for, its close relative the "ice plant" (Carpobrotus edulis), which is larger, and grows alongside and sometimes hybridizes with C. chilensis. For comparison, the larger flowers of C. edulis (6.4 to 15.2 cm [2.5 to 6 in] in diameter) are yellow or light pink, whereas C. chilensis flowers are smaller (3.8 to 6.4 cm [1.5 to 2.5 in] in diameter) and deep magenta.

The flowers open in the morning and close at night, and it can bloom and fruit all year round. The fruit has 8–10 chambers.

The plant can easily be propagated by cuttings, which can be planted immediately in soil and will root without the need of rooting hormone or mist.

== Taxonomy ==
Along with C. edulis, it was once placed in Mesembryanthemum.

== Distribution and habitat ==
Usually found in warm temperate and subtropical areas, it is probably native to southern Africa. It is familiar elsewhere, particularly the coastline of western North America, where it is an introduced invasive species that has taken hold and become commonplace. It is also found, and naturalised, in Argentina, Chile, Peru, Ecuador, Australia, Spain, Greece, Southern England and New Zealand. Grown in sunny conditions, it is normally found within coastal dunes and bluffs, margins of estuaries, along roadsides; at elevations from sea level to 100 m (330 ft) along the southern Pacific Coast of North America.

== Ecology ==
Growing well in poor sandy soil, this species is hardy and can withstand disturbance by humans, which is common on the well-travelled beaches where it grows. This trait gives it an advantage over many native plant species, causing it to become a threat to native coastal ecosystems where it has invaded.

== Uses ==
The plant has a pleasant flavour, although it can be laxative if eaten in high quantity, especially its fruit. The plant can be consumed raw or cooked (especially its leaves), or dried for future use or made into pickles and chutney. There is only a tiny amount of flesh in the fruit, and it must be fully ripe otherwise it is very sour. The leaves can be used in salads and can also be used as a replacement for pickled cucumber.
