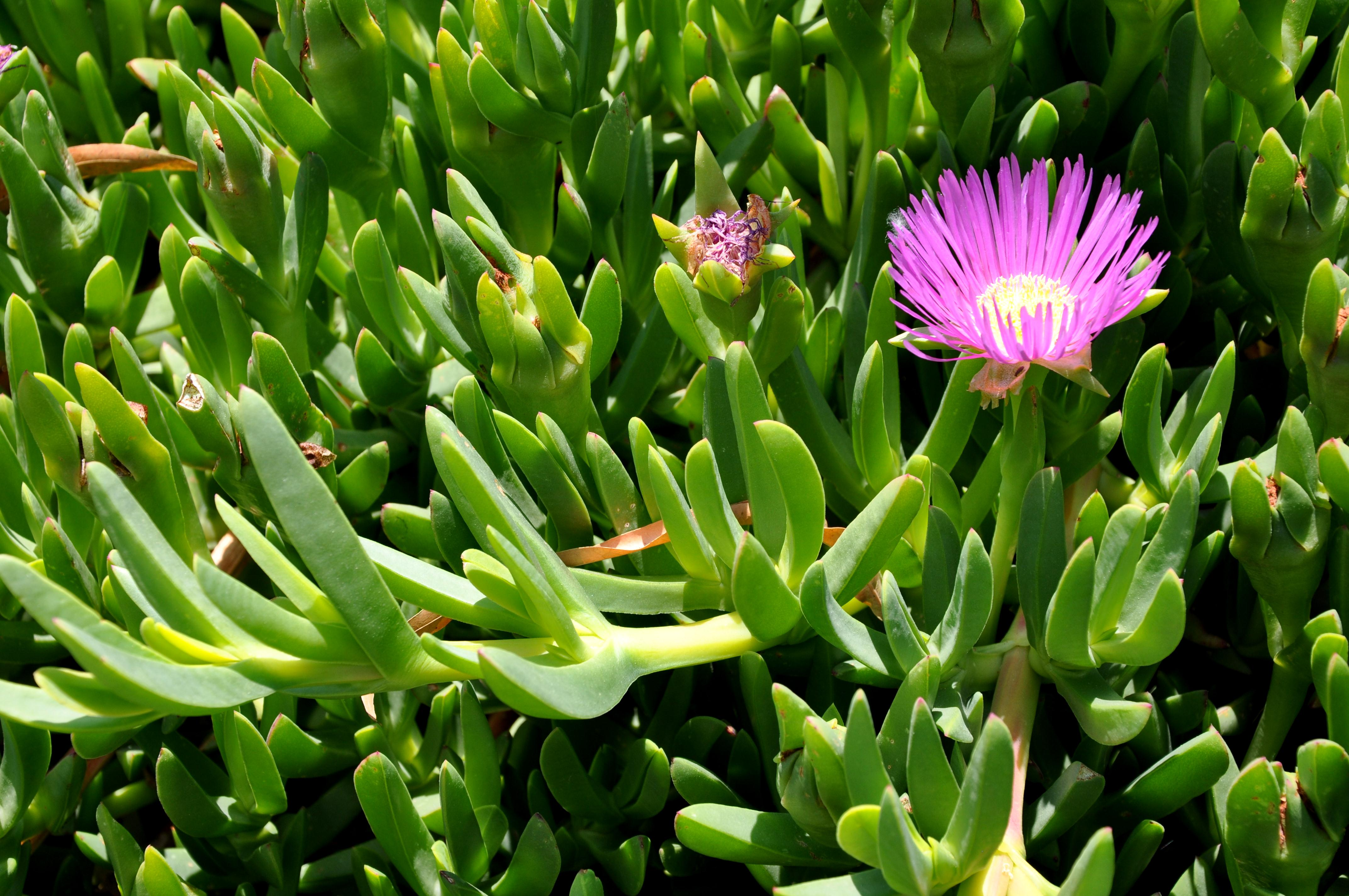

Scientific classification
- Kingdom: Plantae
- Clade: Embryophytes
- Clade: Tracheophytes
- Clade: Spermatophytes
- Clade: Angiosperms
- Clade: Eudicots
- Order: Caryophyllales
- Family: Aizoaceae
- Genus: Carpobrotus
- Species: C. modestus

Binomial name
- Carpobrotus modestus S.T.Blake

= Carpobrotus modestus =

Species of succulent

Carpobrotus modestus, commonly known as inland pigface, is a succulent perennial of the family Aizoaceae, native to Australia. It produces purple flowers which mature into fruits. It is mainly used as a groundcover succulent or as a drought tolerant plant.

== Description ==
It is a prostrate succulent with stems up to 50 centimetres (20 in) long and 3 to 8 millimetres (0.1–0.3 in) in diameter. The leaves are 3 to 7 centimetres (1.2–2.8 in) long, 4 to 9 millimetres (0.16–0.35 in) thick, glaucous and often tinged pink, usually slightly thicker than wide near the middle, with flat to slightly convex faces and a smooth or finely toothed keel near the tip. The flowers are about 2 centimetres (0.8 in) in diameter and usually sessile. Each has five sepals, the two longest 8 to 18 millimetres (0.3–0.7 in) long, around 45 to 60 petal-like staminodes 6 to 12 millimetres (0.2–0.5 in) long that are purple with a white base, and 20 to 100 stamens. Species contain both male and female reproductive organs (hermaphrodite.)

The fruit is fleshy, purple when ripe, and appears fig-like, it is narrowly ellipsoid to obovoid, 1.5 to 2 centimetres (0.6–0.8 in) long with a recurved stalk. Flowering occurs from August to November in Western Australia and from September to February in eastern Australia.

=== Similar species ===
Carpobrotus edulis, native to South Africa, is an invasive member of the genus and often confused with native species of Carpobrotus. C. edulis forms dense mats that suppress the regeneration of native vegetation and alter soil chemistry. Other Carpobrotus species have also naturalised outside their native ranges, with several listed among the most invasive plants in the Mediterranean Basin.

== Distribution and habitat ==
Carpobrotus modestus is found in areas of Western Australia, South Australia and Victoria. situated in heath, shrubland, and woodland areas with clayey-sand. The species occurs in a range of soil types, including sandy, loamy, and clay. Although the habitat plays a large part in a plant's growth and development, inland pigface can grow in acidic, basic, and neutral soil pH that is well-drained. In these tough environments, the Inland Pigface can tolerate harsh habitual influences such as droughts, frost, and salinity in the soil.

== Taxonomy ==
Carpobrotus modestus was first formally described in 1969 by Australian botanist Stanley Thatcher Blake in Contributions from the Queensland Herbarium from material collected in South Australia. It belongs to the genus Carpobrotus (Aizoaceae), which comprises prostrate succulent herbs native to South Africa and Australia. Within the Australian members of the genus, C. modestus is distinguished by its relatively small flowers (about 2 cm in diameter) and narrow, often pink-tinged leaves.

== Ecology ==
Carpobrotus modestus switches between CAM and C_{3} photosynthesis. When soil water is limited, the plant utilises CAM photosynthesis, switching to C_{3} photosynthesis when water become available. C. modestus acts as a post-fire pioneer in semi-arid shrublands, appearing soon after fire and persisting for several years before disappearing as the shrubland canopy closes during regeneration.

=== Food ===
Both the fruit and leaves of C. modestus are reported to be used by first nations people in Australia as a source of food.

=== Medicinal ===
The leaves of C. modestus have been traditionally applied to treat stings, burns, and skin irritations in a manner similar to Aloe vera. Extracts from the leaves have also demonstrated antioxidant, antiplatelet, and anti-inflammatory activity.
