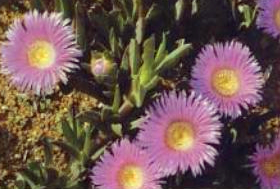

Scientific classification
- Kingdom: Plantae
- Clade: Tracheophytes
- Clade: Angiosperms
- Clade: Eudicots
- Order: Caryophyllales
- Family: Aizoaceae
- Genus: Carpobrotus
- Species: C. muirii

Binomial name
- Carpobrotus muirii (L. Bolus) L. Bolus

= Carpobrotus muirii =

Species of succulent

Carpobrotus muirii (commonly known as dwarf sourfig or Dwerg Suurvy) is a succulent perennial of the family Aizoaceae, native to the Overberg region in the Western Cape, South Africa.

== Description ==
This species of Carpobrotus has distinctively slender (40–80mm x 5–6 mm), incurved, glaucous-green leaves.

Its receptacle is subglobose to ovate, with a base that narrows rather abruptly where it meets the stalk. The ovary has a top that is usually flat-to-depressed in the centre.

=== Related species ===
Of the other six Carpobrotus species which occur in South Africa, this species is particularly closely related to Carpobrotus deliciosus, which has a similar shaped receptacle, but the latter is a much larger plant that occurs further to the east, mainly in the Eastern Cape. The dwarf sourfig has much thinner, narrower leaves, and only occurs in the Western Cape.

== Distribution ==
This species has a small distribution range, being restricted to the Overberg region in the Western Cape, South Africa.

It occurs on coastal limestones near the towns of Heidelberg and Riversdale. Along the coast it can be found from Arniston and De Hoop, as far east as Stilbaai. Here it is found in coastal limestone or Strandveld vegetation, usually within ten kilometres of the coast.

Its sweet edible fruits are grazed by tortoises and other southern African animals, and are also used locally to make traditional preserves.

Its natural range is declining due to alien invasive species and wheat farming.
