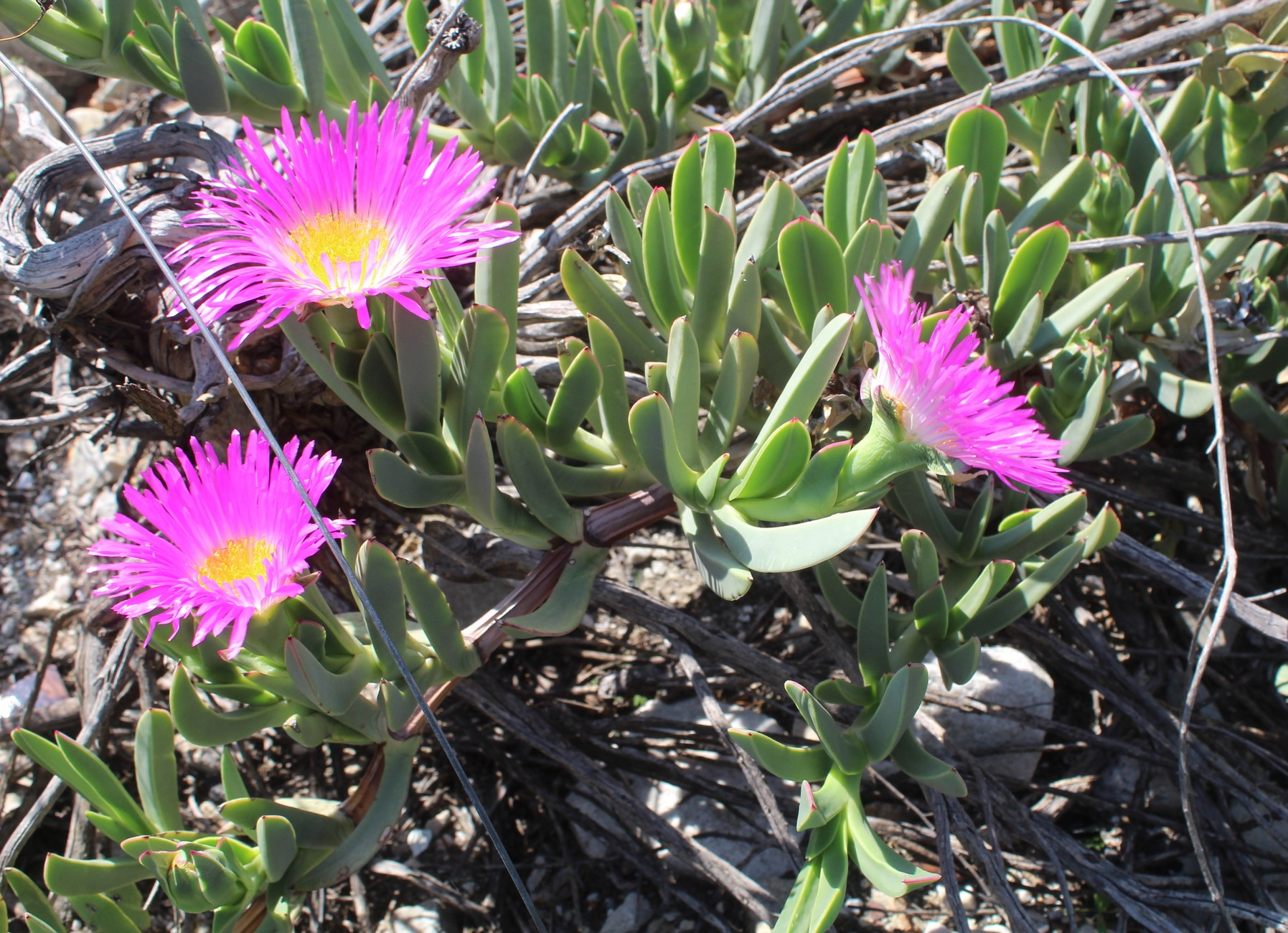

Scientific classification
- Kingdom: Plantae
- Clade: Tracheophytes
- Clade: Angiosperms
- Clade: Eudicots
- Order: Caryophyllales
- Family: Aizoaceae
- Genus: Carpobrotus
- Species: C. quadrifidus

Binomial name
- Carpobrotus quadrifidus L. Bolus

= Carpobrotus quadrifidus =

Species of succulent

Carpobrotus quadrifidus (commonly known as west-coast sourfig, Weskus suurvy) is a succulent perennial of the family Aizoaceae, native to the west coast of South Africa.

A possible synonym is Carpobrotus sauerae.

== Description ==
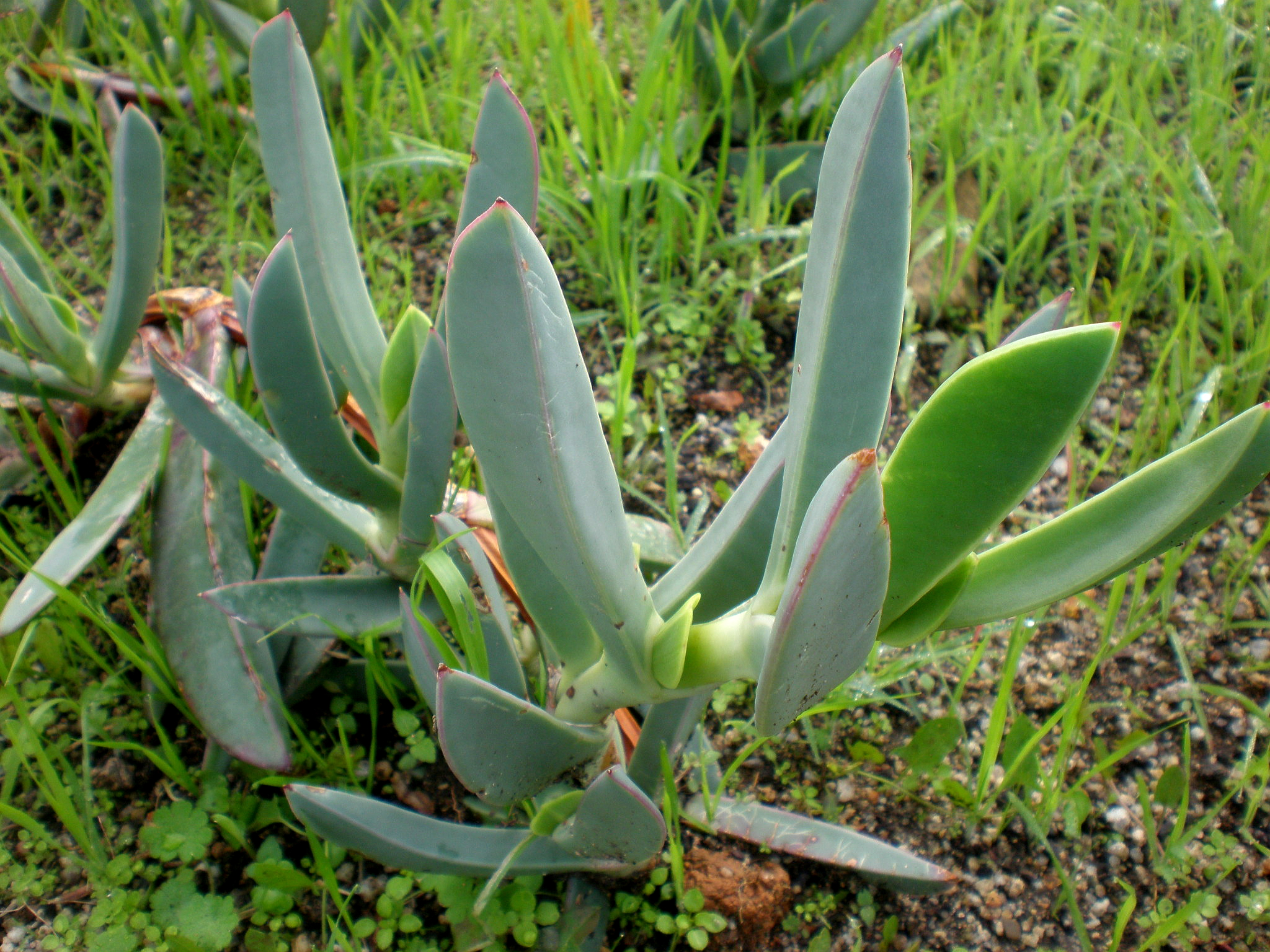
The distinctive smooth, hard-surfaced leaves of the West-coast Sourfig.

This Carpobrotus ("sour-fig") species has the largest flowers produced by any species in its Mesembryanthemaceae family. The flowers are typically a bright pink colour, although some white-flowered forms can be found in the far northern limits of its distribution range. They appear in spring.

The receptacle is typically subclavate, with a base that narrows abruptly into the stalk. The top of the ovary is flat or slightly raised in the centre. Its fruits are sweet when ripe, and are edible raw. They are also grazed by tortoises and other southern African animals.

This is an extremely robust species, and its leaves are much larger than those of other Carpobrotus species. They leaves are glaucous-grey in colour, and have a distinctive smooth, hard, firm-textured surface, with cartilaginous margins. The leaves are erect and relatively straight (or only slightly acinaciform), and have an isosceles triangle shape to their cross-section.

== Distribution and habitat ==
Their natural habitat is the low-lying coastal strip along the west coast of South Africa, from as far south as Melkbosstrand in Cape Town, northwards along the coast through Saldanha Bay and Langebaan where it is extremely common, to the coast around Lambert's Bay, with further sporadic populations even further north in the Northern Cape province.

In Cape Town, to the south of its natural distribution range, it transitions into the related species Carpobrotus acinaciformis.
