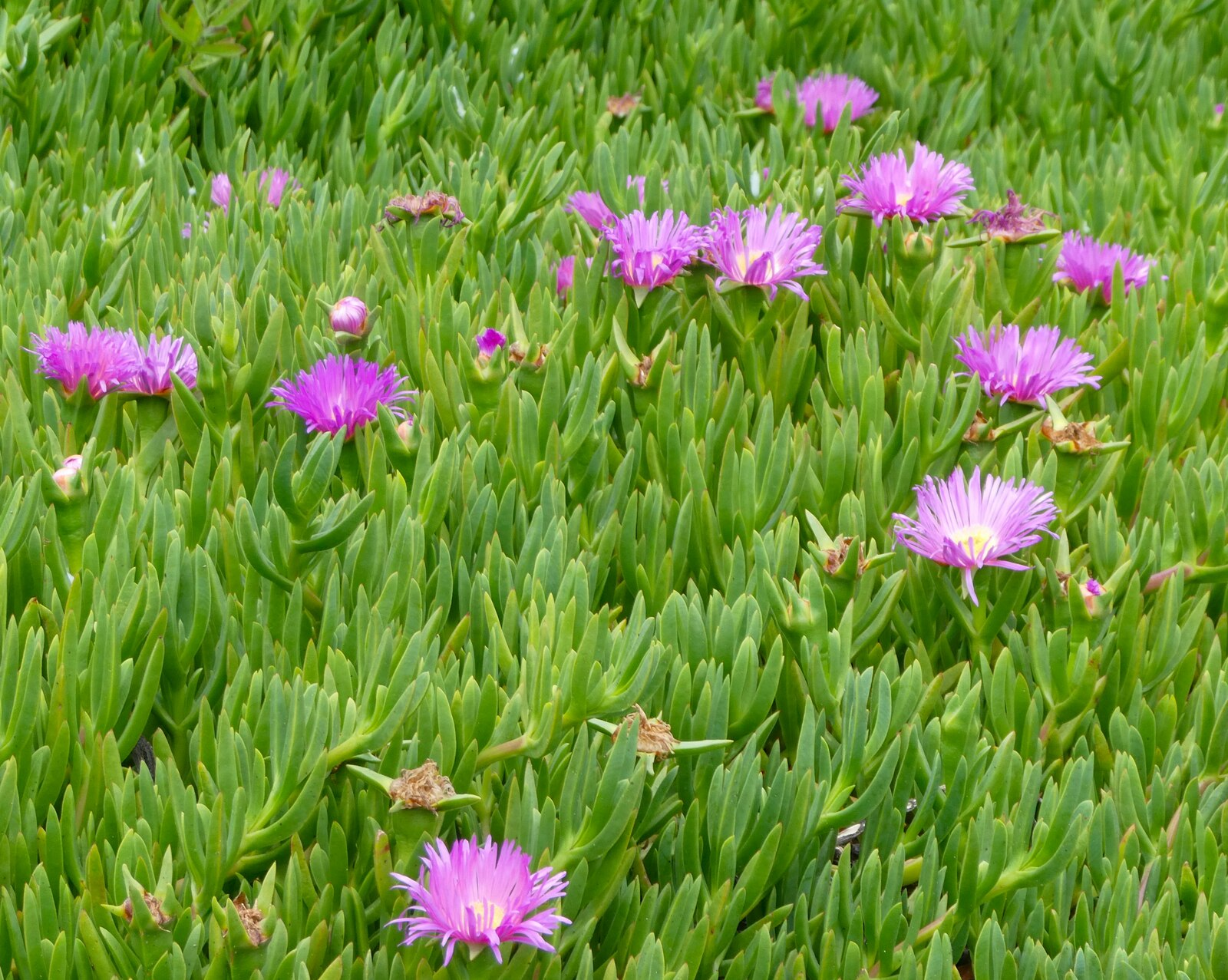
- In Folkestone, coastal town in southern England

Scientific classification
- Kingdom: Plantae
- Clade: Tracheophytes
- Clade: Angiosperms
- Clade: Eudicots
- Order: Caryophyllales
- Family: Aizoaceae
- Genus: Carpobrotus
- Species: C. × accedens

Binomial name
- Carpobrotus × accedens B.P.R.Chéron

Synonyms
- Carpobrotus edulis var. rubescens Druce; Carpobrotus × luxuriatus B.P.R.Chéron

= Carpobrotus × accedens =

Hybrid species of succulent

Carpobrotus × accedens is a hybrid species of flowering plant in the family Aizoaceae. It is a hybrid between C. acinaciformis and C. edulis. It occurs naturally in the Cape Provinces of South Africa, and has been introduced to parts of Great Britain, France, Spain and Greece, including the East Aegean islands. Under the synonym Carpobrotus edulis var. rubescens, it has been recorded on the south coast of England.

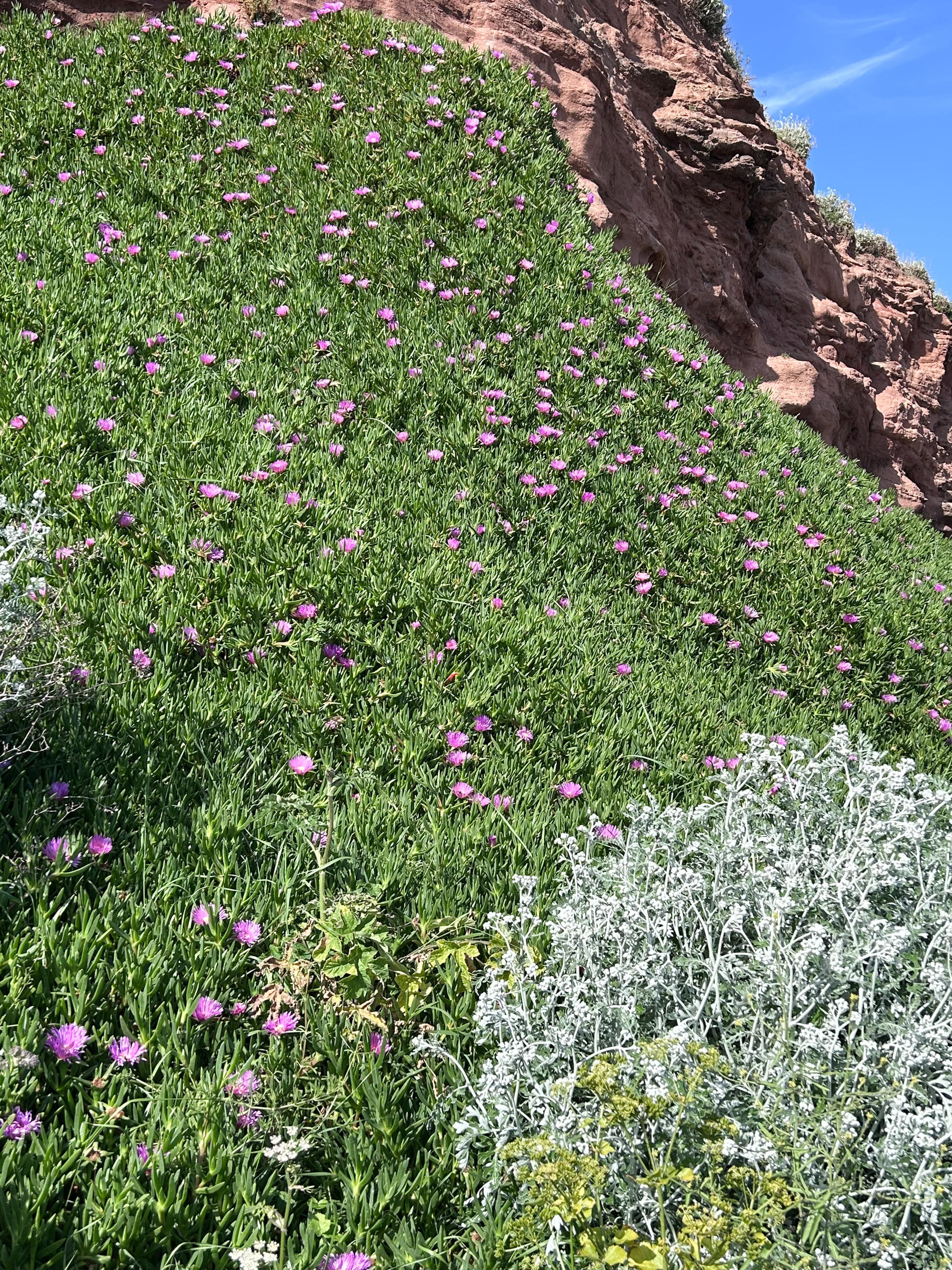
Naturalized on cliffside in southern England

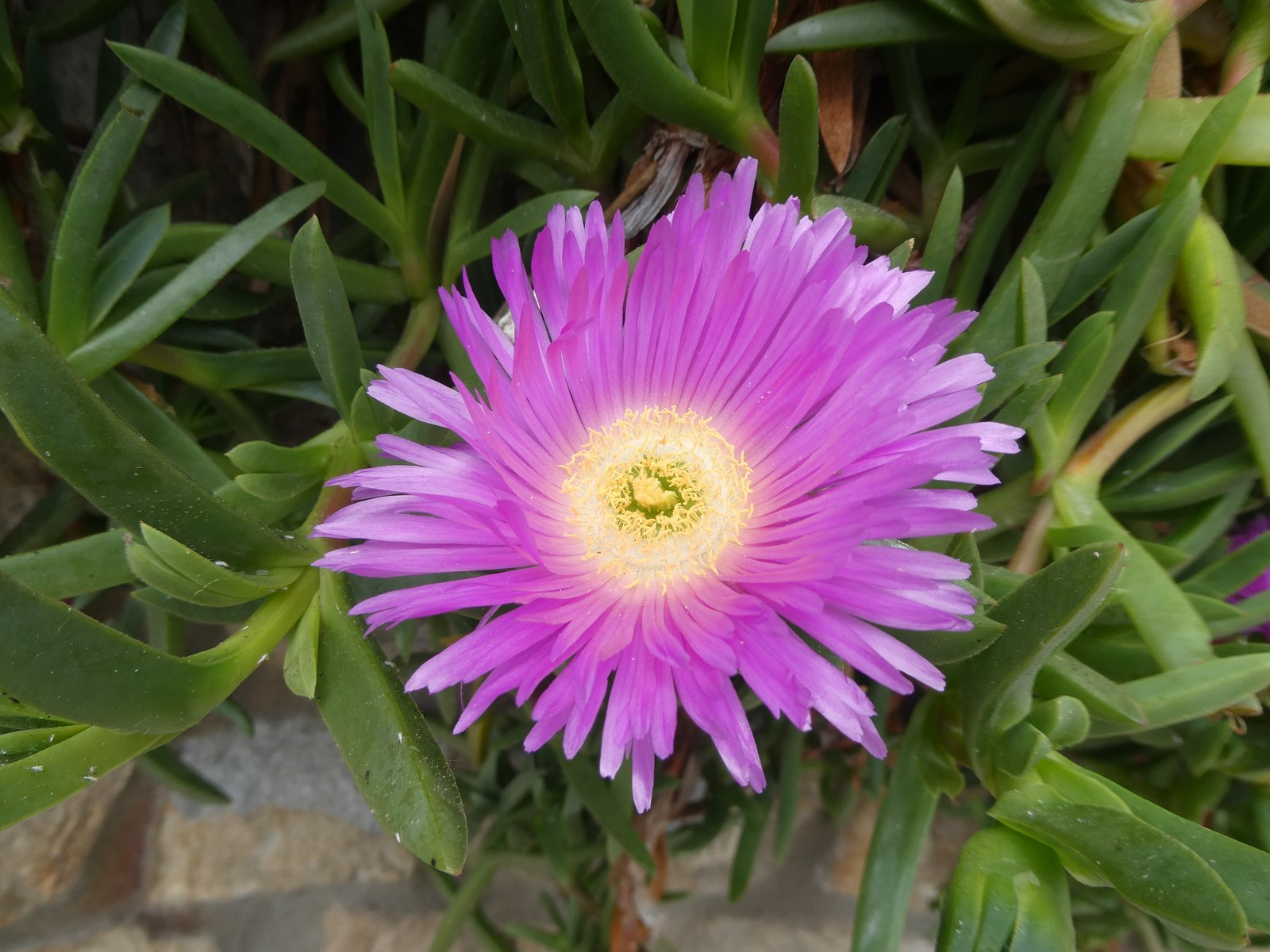
Flower
