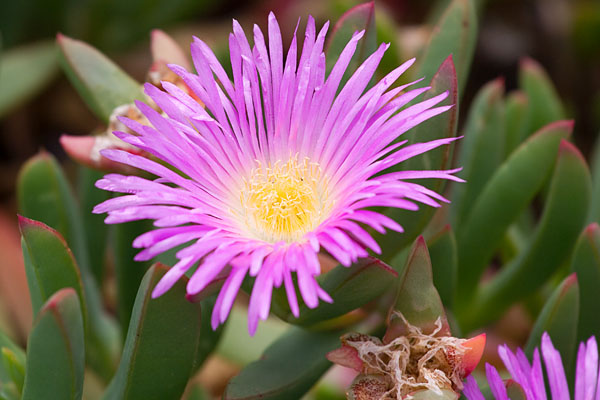

Scientific classification
- Kingdom: Plantae
- Clade: Embryophytes
- Clade: Tracheophytes
- Clade: Angiosperms
- Clade: Eudicots
- Order: Caryophyllales
- Family: Aizoaceae
- Genus: Carpobrotus
- Species: C. aequilaterus

Binomial name
- Carpobrotus aequilaterus (Haw.) N.E.Br.

= Carpobrotus aequilaterus =

Species of succulent

Carpobrotus aequilaterus, common names: angled pigface, Chilean pigface, This species is thought to have originated in southern Africa (or possibly South America) and a naturalised weed elsewhere. However, according to VicFlora it is native to South Africa, It is also known as the sea fig.

The plant grows along the coast from sea level and up to 100 metres higher. It can be found in Chile, California, Mexico, and Australia. It is a naturalised weed in North America, New Zealand, and Australia (in New South Wales, Tasmania, Victoria, South Australia), and Western Australia).

== Description ==
Carpobrotus aequilaterus has an edible fruit. The flavour is said to be like strawberry but they have a poor structure. The flowers are pollinated by bees although the flowers are hermaphrodite. The plants grow from 8 to 72 inches high.
