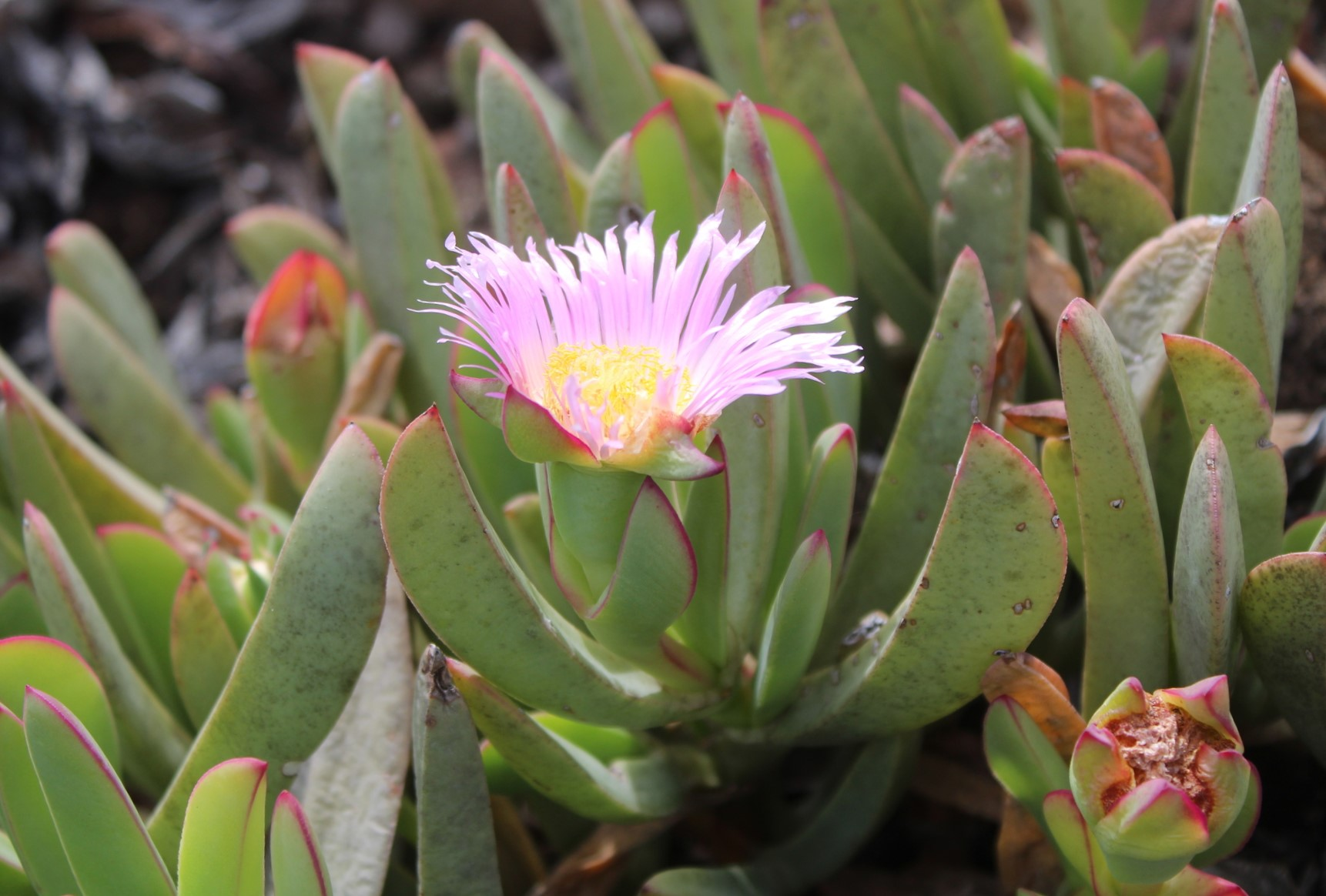

Scientific classification
- Kingdom: Plantae
- Clade: Tracheophytes
- Clade: Angiosperms
- Clade: Eudicots
- Order: Caryophyllales
- Family: Aizoaceae
- Genus: Carpobrotus
- Species: C. mellei

Binomial name
- Carpobrotus mellei (L. Bolus) L. Bolus

= Carpobrotus mellei =

Mountain sourfig

Species of succulent

Carpobrotus mellei (commonly known as mountain sourfig, Berg suurvy) is a succulent perennial of the family Aizoaceae, native to the inland mountain ranges of the Western Cape, South Africa.

== Description ==
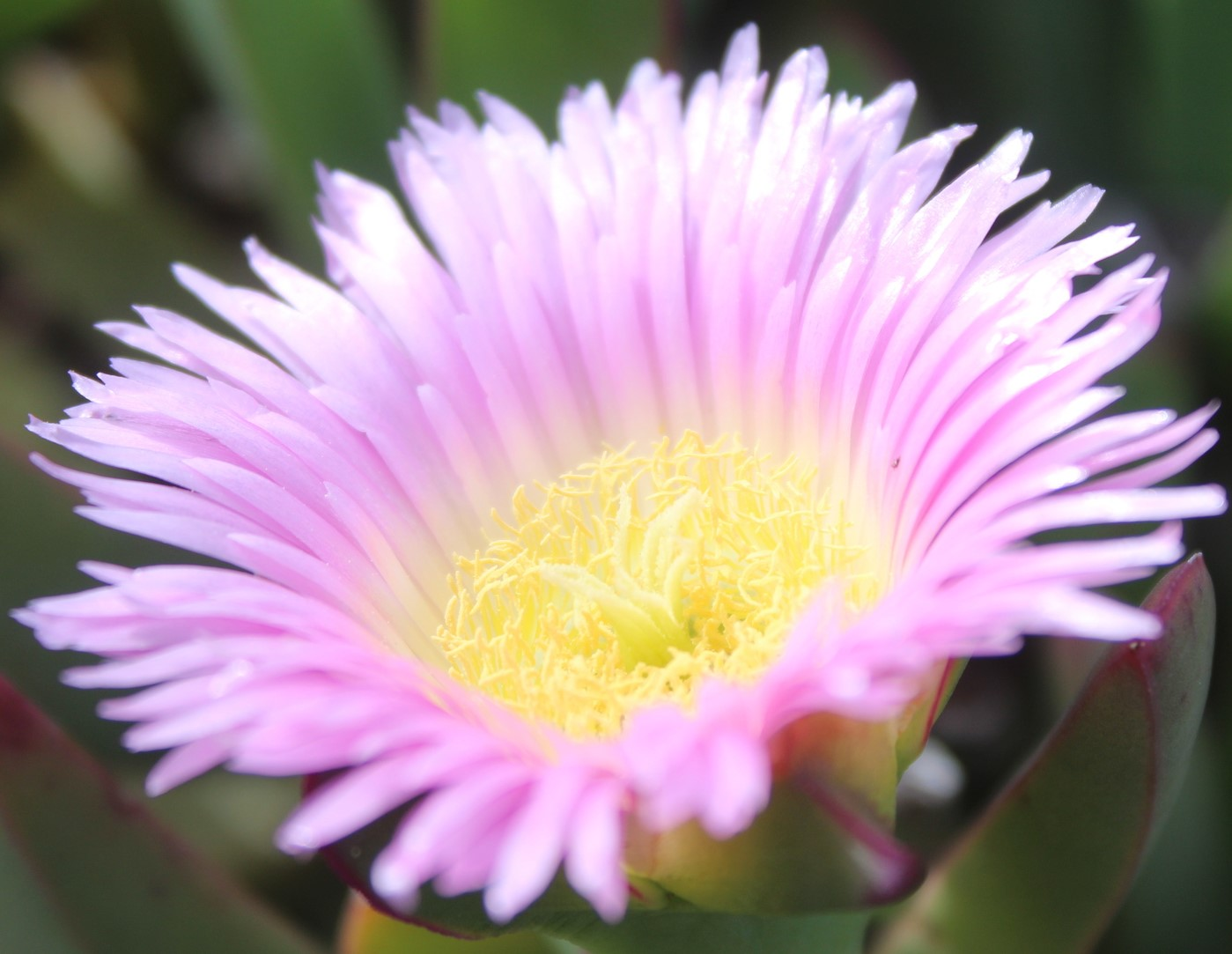
The stigmas in the centre of the C. mellei flower are very long, rising above the surrounding stamens.

The leaves are usually a glaucous green, sometimes reddish along the leaf's edges or angles. The leaf shape is relatively straight, curving mainly at apex. The apex often has a serrated, reddish keel and mucro. The leaves are also somewhat flattened laterally, causing them to form an isosceles triangle in cross-section.

The flowers are usually a pale pink or purple colour. The stigmas are very long, at some points rising up above the stamens. The centre of the top of the ovary is raised. The receptacle of C. mellei is barrel-shaped to turbiniform.

=== Diagnostic characters ===
Carpobrotus mellei can be distinguished from other similar species in the genus, by a combination of its very long stigmas (usually rising above the stamens), its barrel-shaped or turbiniform receptacle, and by its higher altitude sandstone mountain habitat.

== Distribution and habitat ==
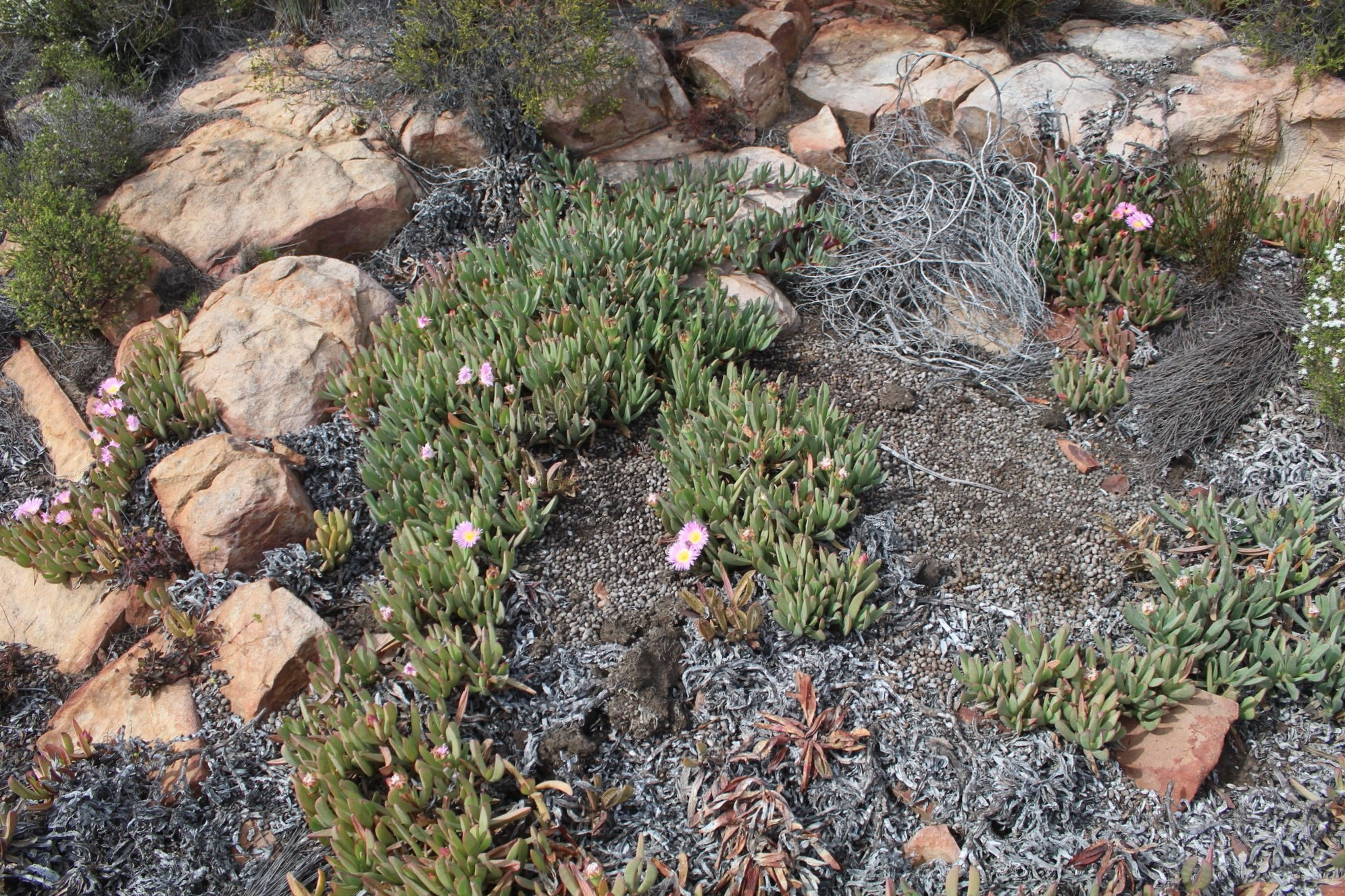
Carpobrotus mellei is adapted to the high sandstone mountains of the southern Cape, South Africa

Carpobrotus ("Sour-fig") species are generally coastal plants, and of the seven species which occur in South Africa, this is the only species which naturally occurs inland in mountain fynbos.

Its natural habitat is the fynbos vegetation of the Western Cape's mountain ranges, namely the Hottentots Holland, the Langeberg and the Swartberg mountains.

Its fruits are edible and are grazed by tortoises and other southern African animals.
