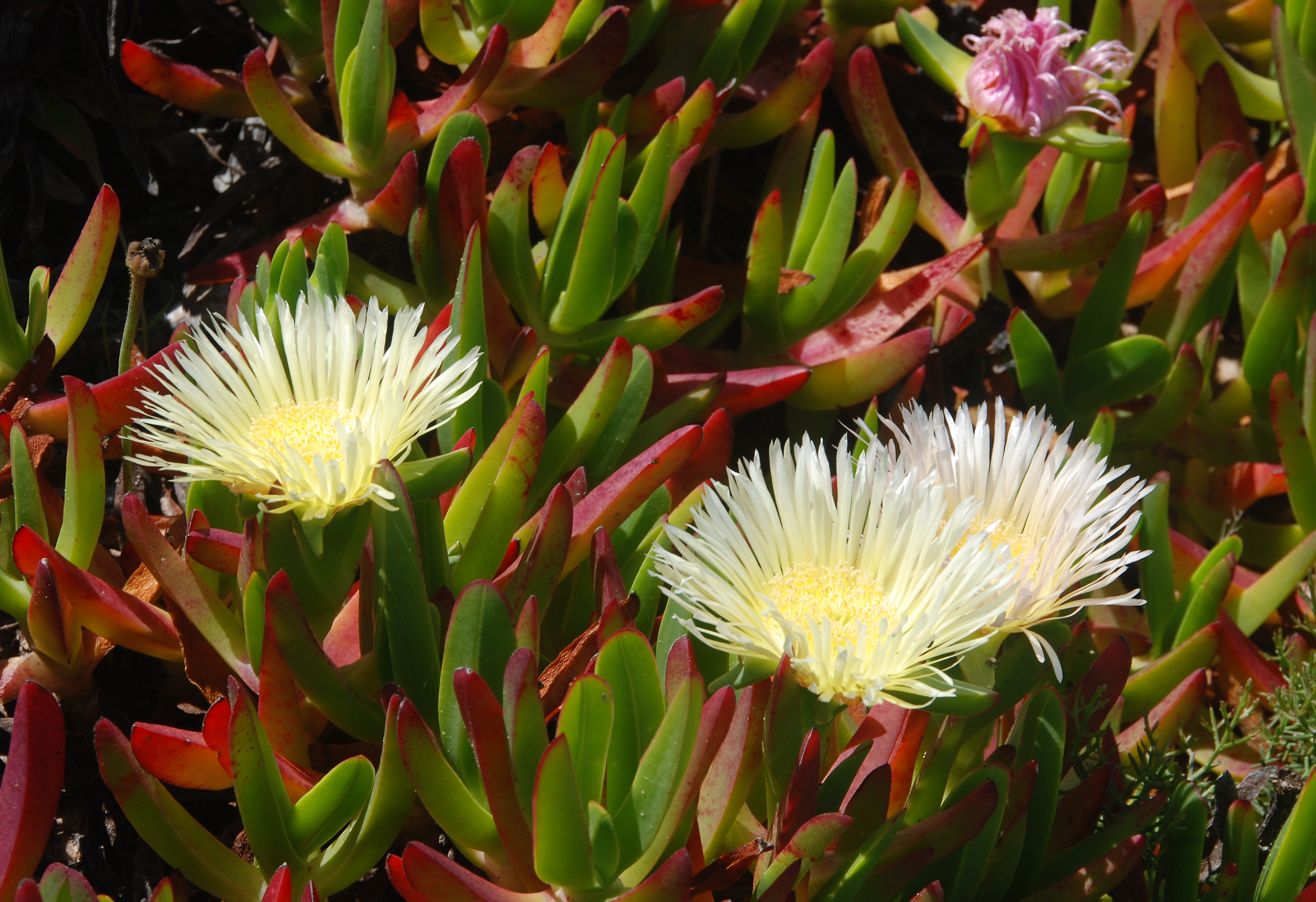
- Carpobrotus edulis

Scientific classification
- Kingdom: Plantae
- Clade: Tracheophytes
- Clade: Angiosperms
- Clade: Eudicots
- Order: Caryophyllales
- Family: Aizoaceae
- Subfamily: Ruschioideae
- Tribe: Ruschieae
- Genus: Carpobrotus; N.E.Br.

= Carpobrotus =

Genus of succulents

Carpobrotus, commonly known as pigface, ice plant, sour fig, sea fig, Hottentot fig, and clawberry is a genus of ground-creeping plants with succulent leaves and large daisy-like flowers. The name comes from the Ancient Greek karpos "fruit" and brotos "edible", referring to its edible fruits.

The genus includes some 12 to 20 accepted species. Most are endemic to South Africa, but there are at least four Australian species and one South American.

== Distribution and habitat ==
Carpobrotus mainly occurs in the sandy coastal habitats of mild Mediterranean climates, and can be also found inland in sandy to marshy places. In general, members of this genus prefer open sandy spaces where their wiry, long roots with shorter side branches form dense underground network. The root networks typically extend much further than the above-ground prostrate branches. Plants thrive well in gardens, but readily escape to other suitable locations, resulting in some members of the genus being considered an invasive species. They can form wide-area ground cover over a sandy soil, which suppresses indigenous sand dune vegetation when introduced to a non-native area.

Carpobrotus is native to South Africa, the south coast of Australia and coastal Chile. As an introduced species, it has become widespread in similar habitats in the Northern Hemisphere: the Pacific coast of the United States, New Zealand and the Mediterranean and Atlantic coasts of Europe. It is also found on the southern coast of Brazil.

== Ecology ==
The fruit of various species of Carpobrotus is eaten by many animals and birds, which also spread its seed.

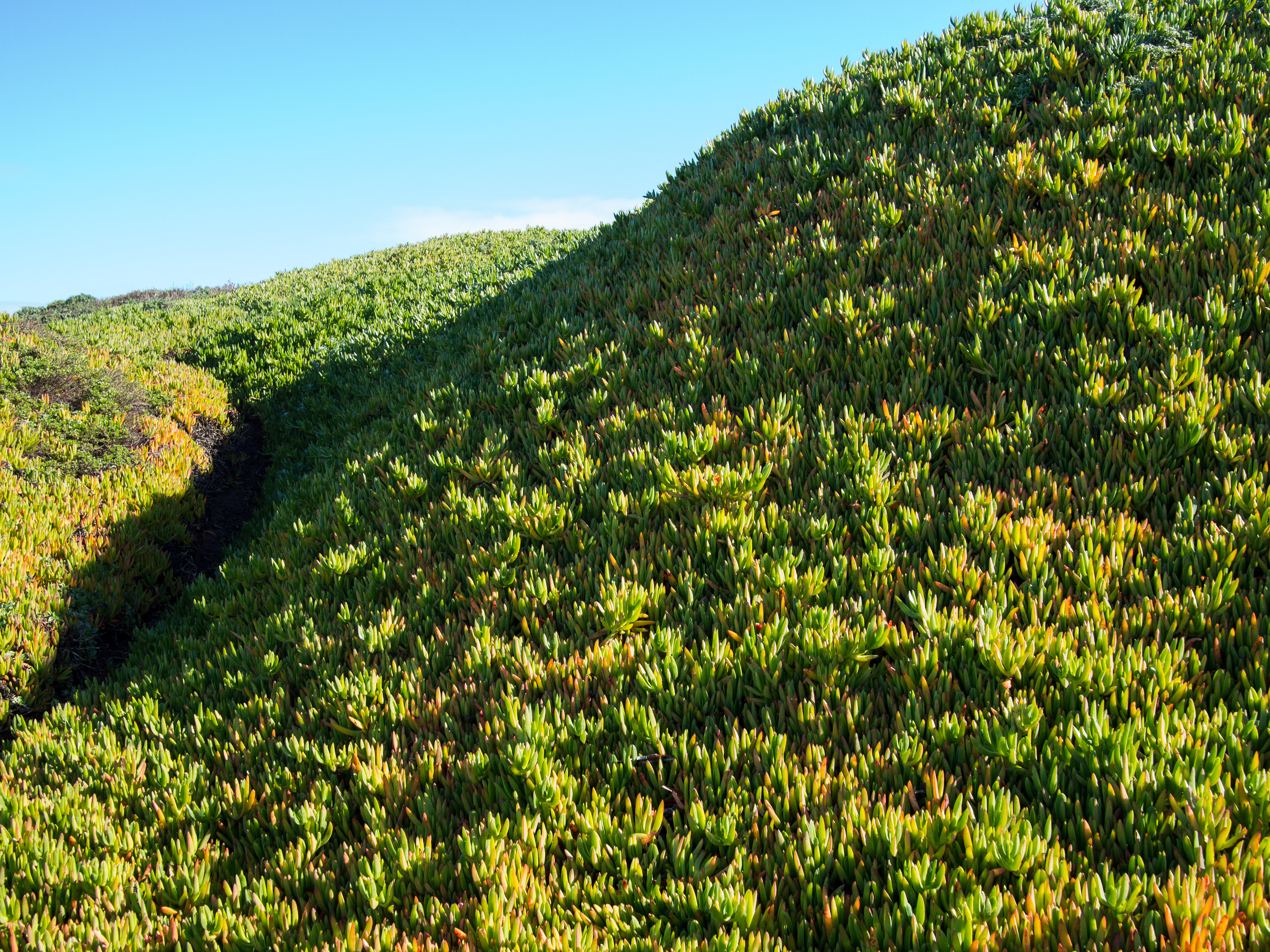
Vast colony of Carpobrotus at the Pescadero Marsh Natural Reserve, California

Various Carpobrotus species are invasive introduced species in suitable climates throughout the world. The harm they do is variable, and sometimes hotly debated, when balanced against their value as firebreaks and as food for wildlife. Seeds are spread by mammals such as deer, rabbits, and rodents eating mature fruit.

== Uses ==
Carpobrotus acinaciformis and Carpobrotus edulis are often used for groundcover due to their rapid growth, dense habit, and resistance to fire. Carpobrotus are also drought tolerant.

C. glaucescens is noted for its salty fruit, a rare property in fruits.

Carpobrotus leaf juice can be used as a mild astringent. Applied to the skin, it is a popular emergency treatment for jellyfish and similar stings. When mixed with water it can be used to treat diarrhea and stomach cramps. It can also be used as a gargle for sore throat, laryngitis, and mild bacterial infections of the mouth, and can be used externally, much like aloe vera, to treat wounds, mosquito bites, sunburn, and skin conditions. It was a remedy for tuberculosis mixed with honey and olive oil. The fruit has been used as a laxative.

== Species ==
Carpobrotus includes the following species:

- Carpobrotus acinaciformis (L.) L.Bolus
- Carpobrotus aequilaterus (Haw.) N.E.Br.
- Carpobrotus chilensis (Molina) N.E.Br.
- Carpobrotus deliciosus (L.Bolus) L.Bolus
- Carpobrotus dimidiatus (Haw.) L.Bolus
- Carpobrotus edulis (L.) N.E.Br.
- Carpobrotus glaucescens (Haw.) Schwantes
- Carpobrotus mellei (L.Bolus) L.Bolus
- Carpobrotus modestus S.T.Blake
- Carpobrotus muirii (L.Bolus) L.Bolus
- Carpobrotus parviflorus (Wisura & Glen) B.P.R.Chéron
- Carpobrotus quadrifidus L.Bolus
- Carpobrotus rossii (Haw.) Schwantes
- Carpobrotus virescens (Haw.) Schwantes

A number of hybrids accepted by Plants of the World Online as of May 2026 were named in 2023 by Brice Chéron:

- Carpobrotus × accedens B.P.R.Chéron = C. acinaciformis × C. edulis
- Carpobrotus × confusus B.P.R.Chéron = C. chilensis × C. edulis
- Carpobrotus × melitinus B.P.R.Chéron = C. edulis × C. mellei
- Carpobrotus × quietus B.P.R.Chéron = C. edulis × C. quadrifidus
- Carpobrotus × rosulentus B.P.R.Chéron = C. edulis × C. rossii
- Carpobrotus × virgilianus B.P.R.Chéron = C. edulis × C. virescens
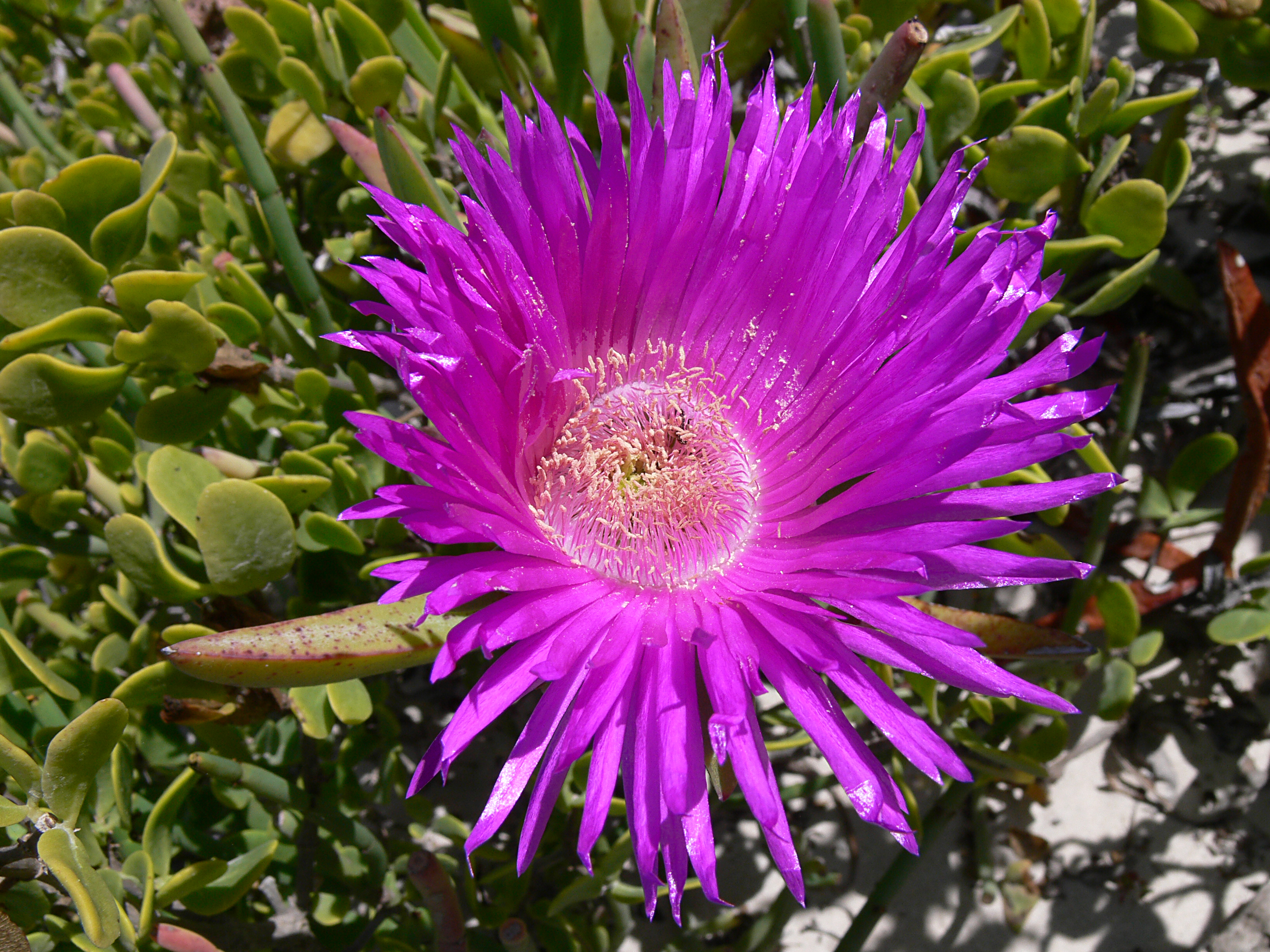
Carpobrotus acinaciformis

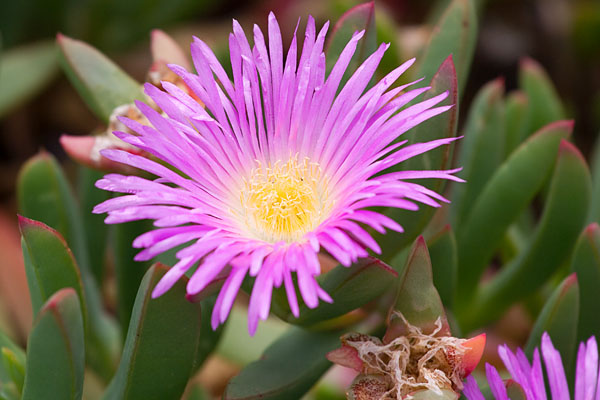
Carpobrotus aequilaterus

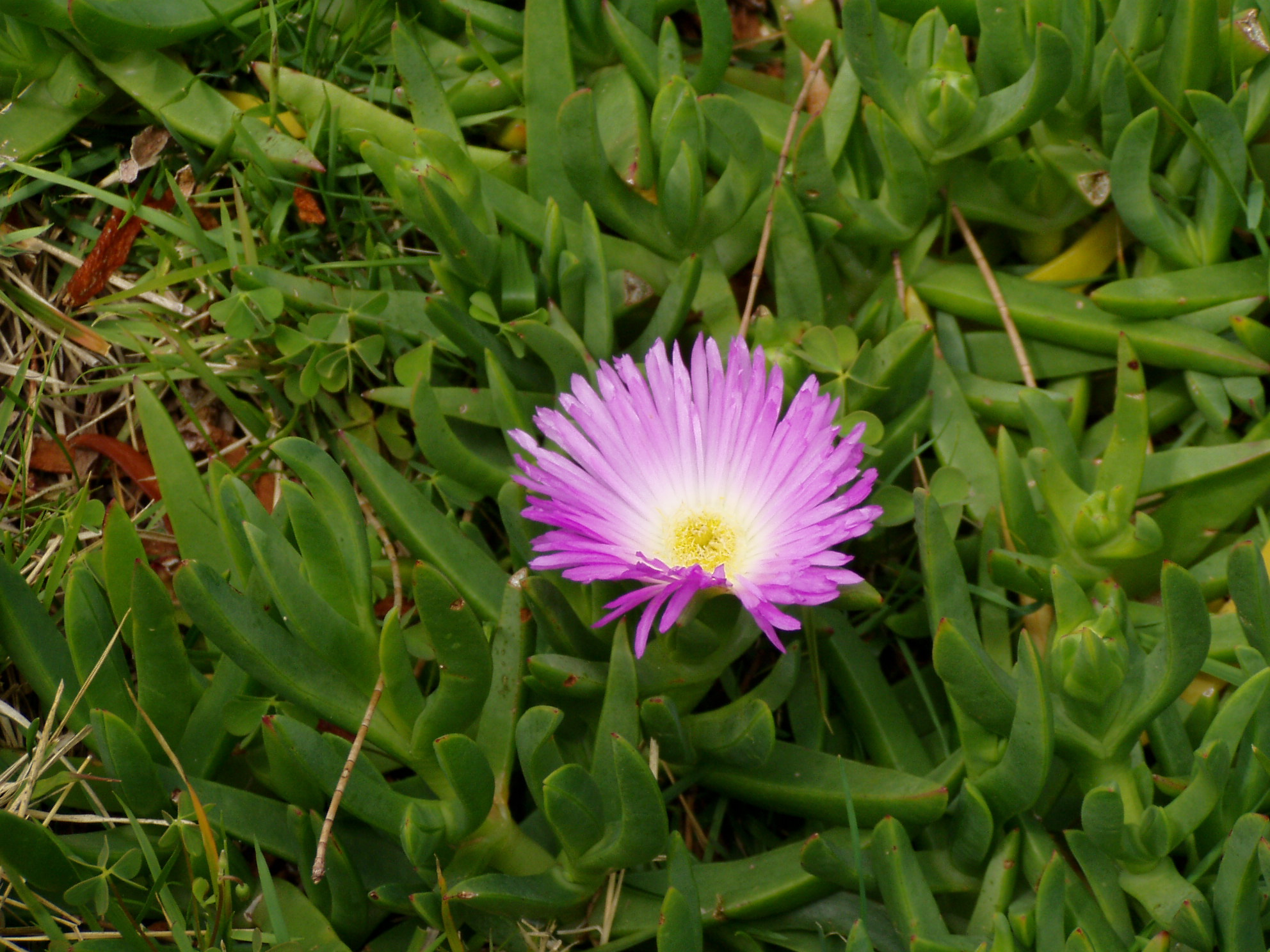
Carpobrotus glaucescens

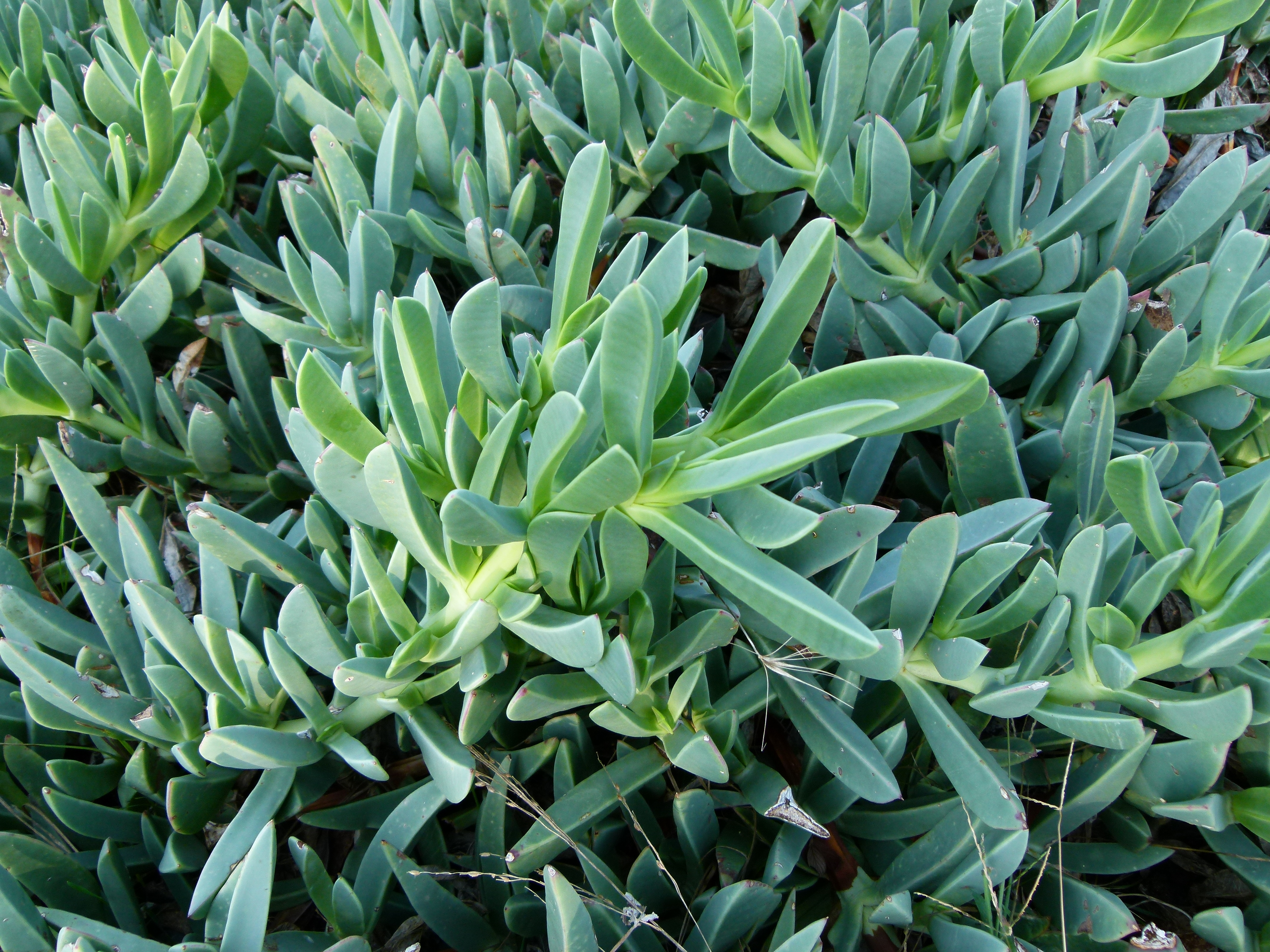
Carpobrotus quadrifidus
