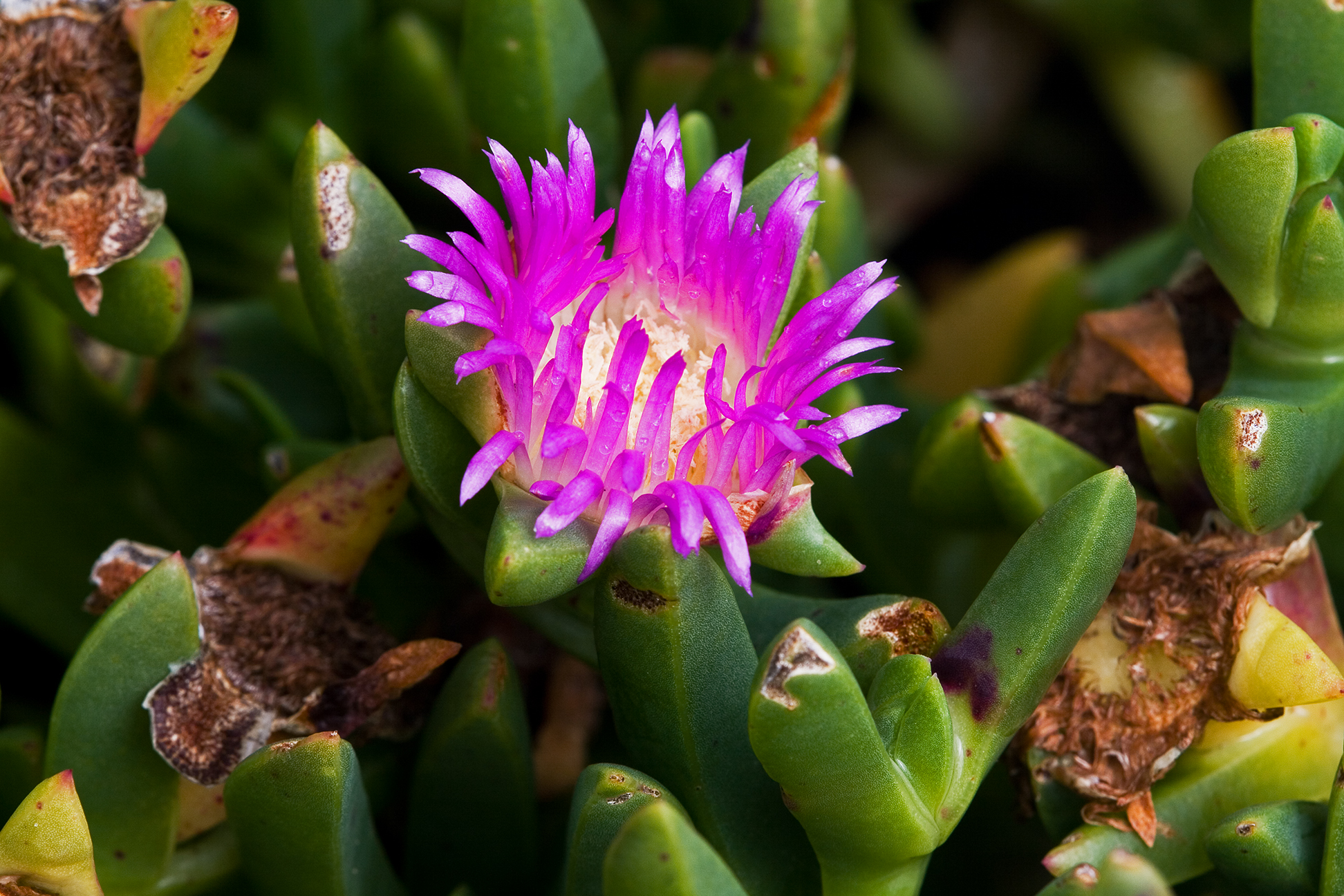
- Flower, Cape Raoul, Tasman Peninsula, Tasmania, Australia

Scientific classification
- Kingdom: Plantae
- Clade: Tracheophytes
- Clade: Angiosperms
- Clade: Eudicots
- Order: Caryophyllales
- Family: Aizoaceae
- Subfamily: Ruschioideae
- Tribe: Ruschieae
- Genus: Carpobrotus
- Species: C. rossii

Binomial name
- Carpobrotus rossii (Haw.) Schwantes

Synonyms
- Mesembryanthemum rossii Haw.

= Carpobrotus rossii =

Species of plant

Carpobrotus rossii (formerly Mesembryanthemum rossii) is a succulent coastal groundcover plant of the family Aizoaceae. Native to southern Australia, it is known by various common names, including karkalla, pig face, sea fig and beach bananas.

C. rossii can be confused with rounded noon-flower Disphyma crassifolium subsp. clavellatum, which has also been erroneously called "karkalla" and "beach bananas" in the Australian native food trade.

== Description ==
Karkalla leaves are succulent, 3.5–10 centimetres (1.4–3.9 inches) long and 1 cm (0.4 in) wide, and curved or rarely straight. The flowers bloom from August through October, are light purple, and are 6 cm (2.4 in) wide. The globular purplish red fruit is about 2.5 cm (1 in) long and 1.5 cm (0.6 in) wide.

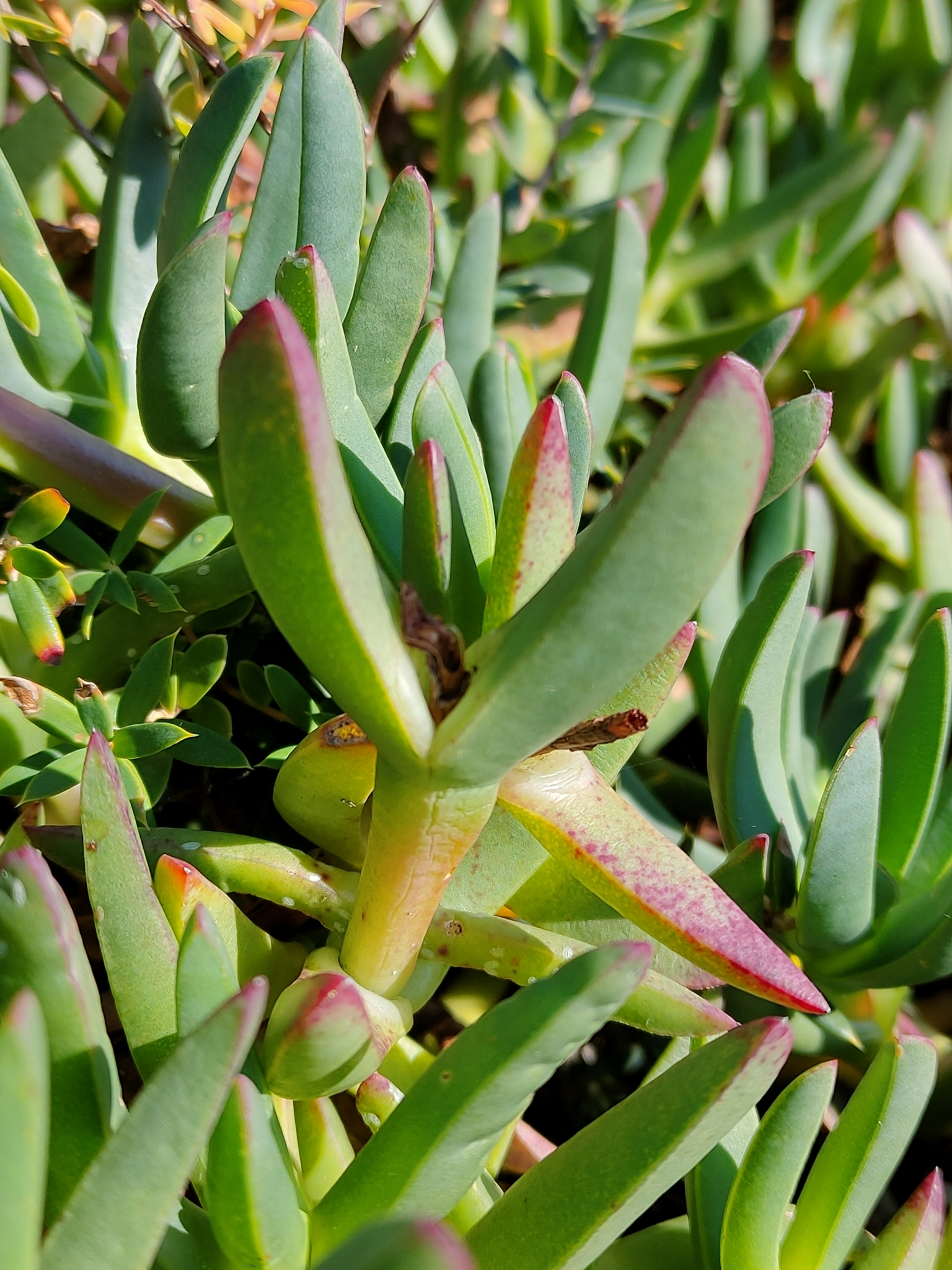

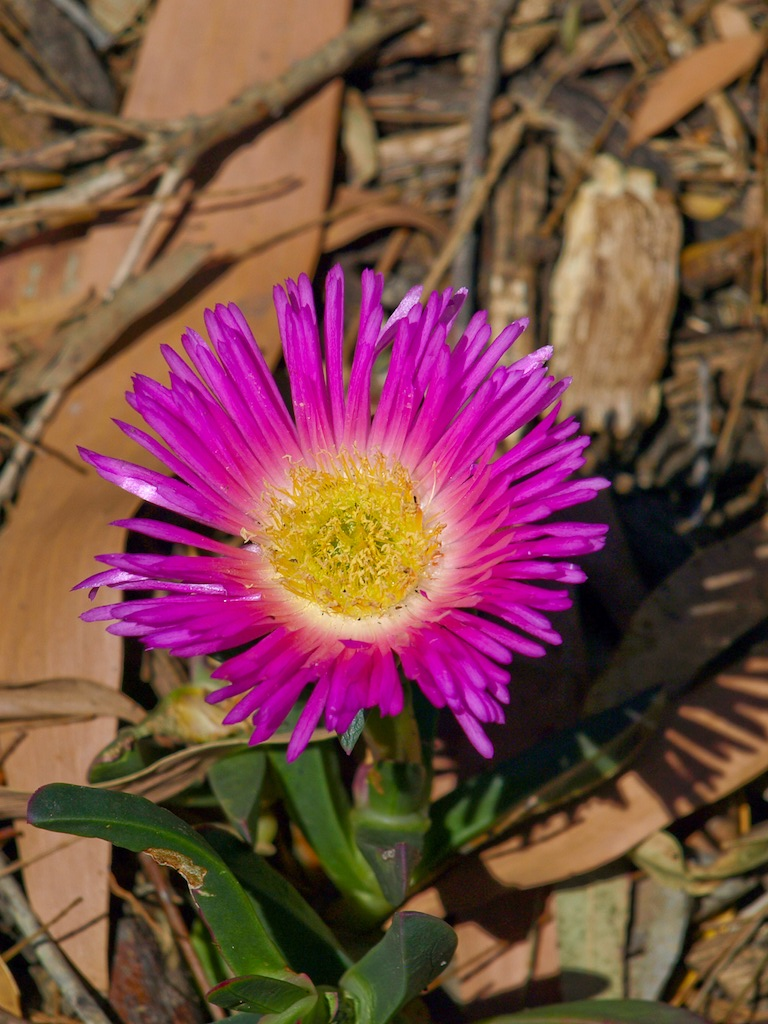

== Distribution and habitat ==
The species occurs in the states of Western Australia, South Australia, Tasmania and Victoria. It can be found year-round in large patches covering sand dunes close to the ocean, due to its hardy nature and salt resistance.

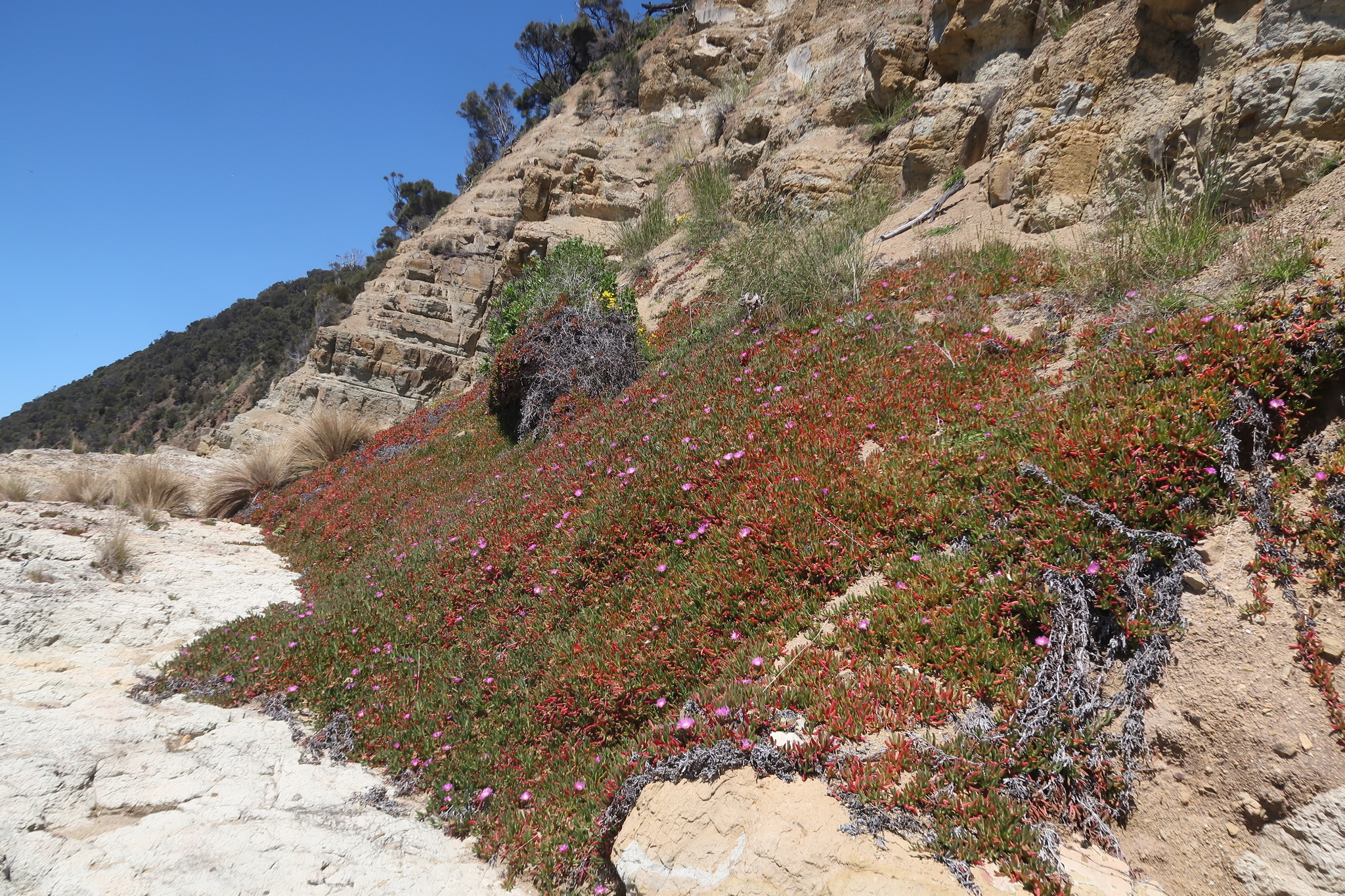

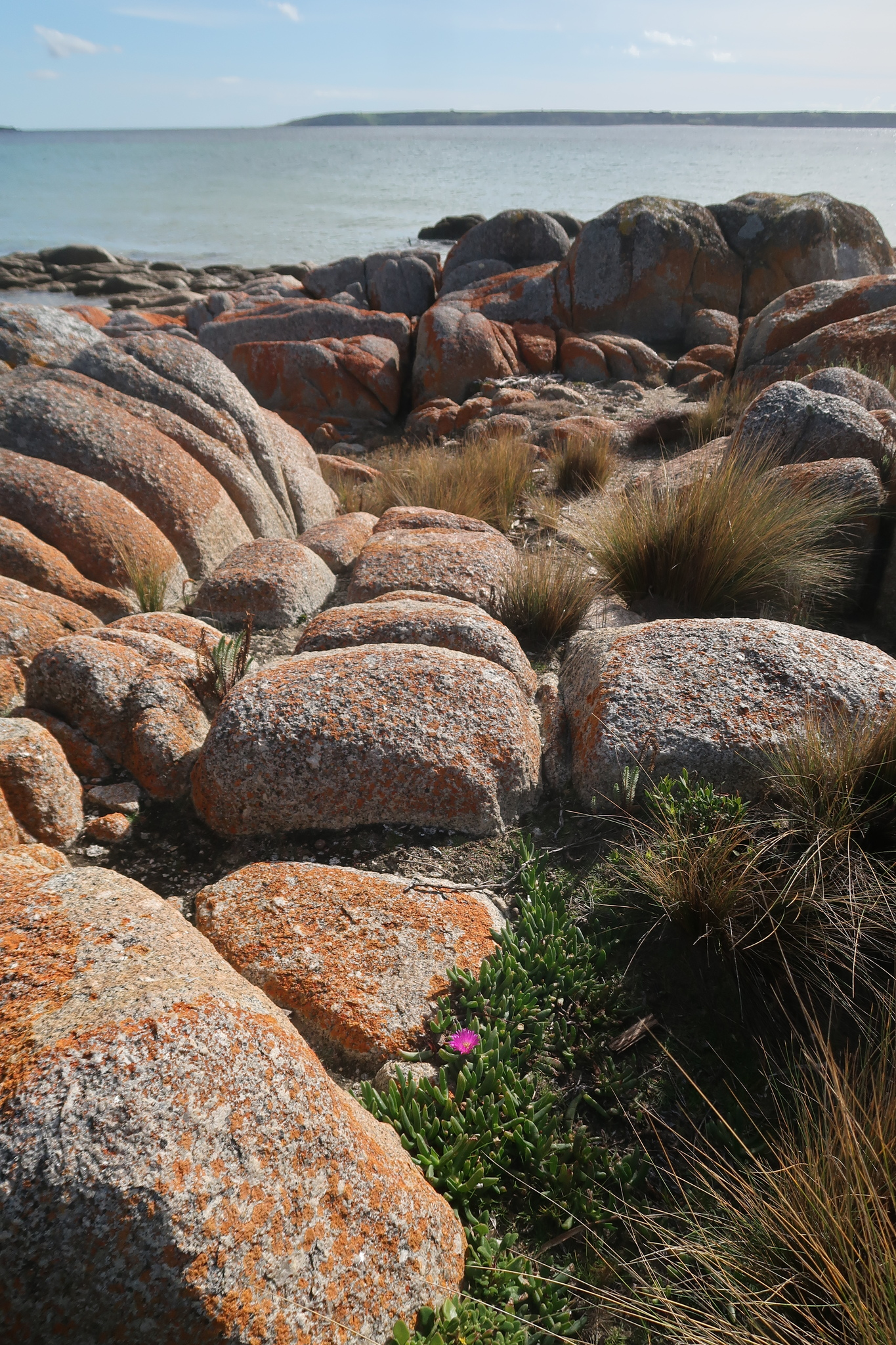

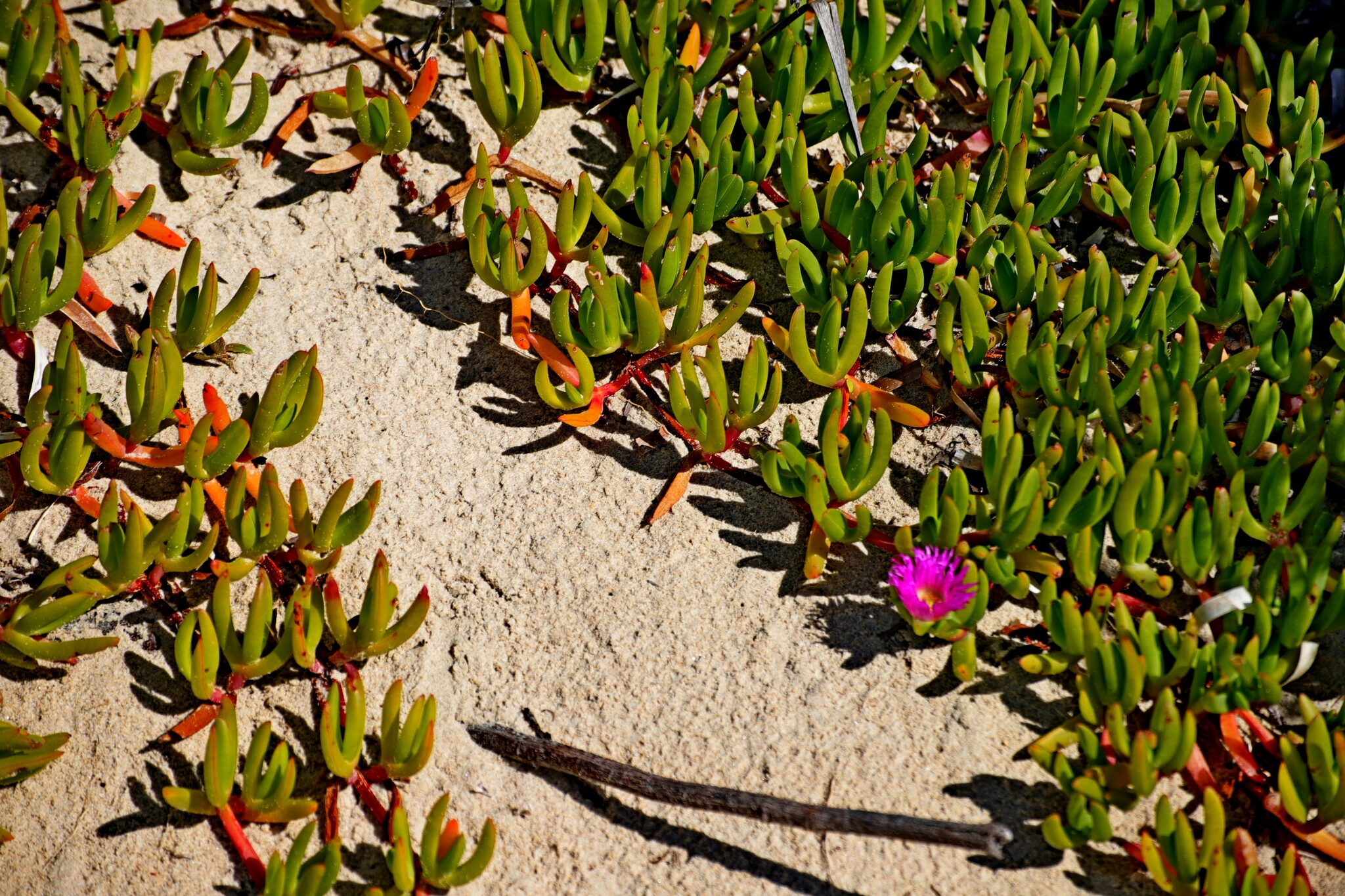

== Conservation ==
Carpobrotus rossii is common on southern Australian coastal sand dunes and is not considered to be at risk.

== Uses ==
Aboriginal people eat the fruit traditionally, fresh and dried. The salty leaves have been eaten with meat.

Extracts of the plant have significant in vitro antioxidant, antiplatelet, and anti-inflammatory activity.
