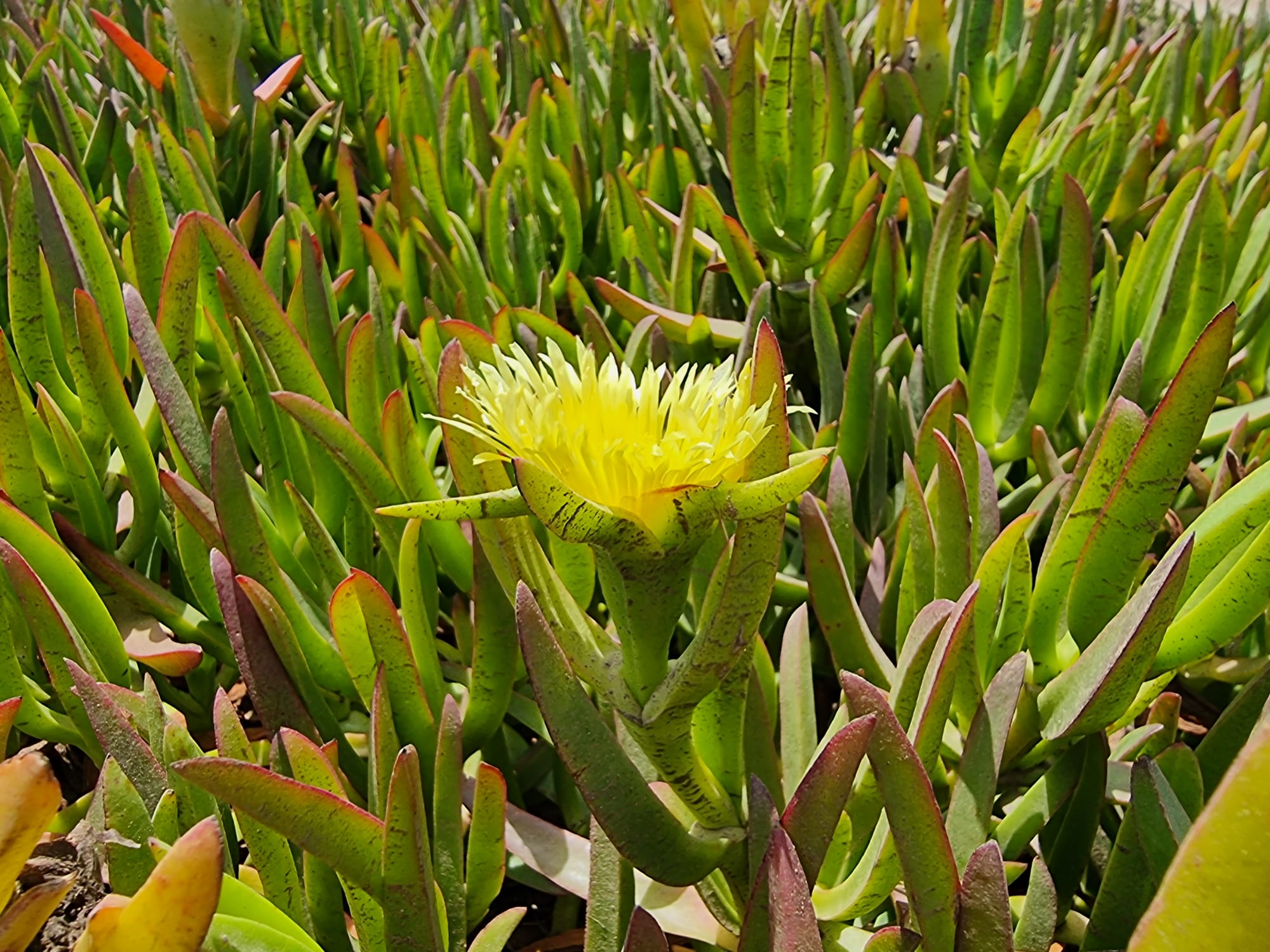
- Flower and fleshy leaves, near Cabo da Roca, Portugal

Scientific classification
- Kingdom: Plantae
- Clade: Embryophytes
- Clade: Tracheophytes
- Clade: Spermatophytes
- Clade: Angiosperms
- Clade: Eudicots
- Order: Caryophyllales
- Family: Aizoaceae
- Genus: Carpobrotus
- Species: C. edulis

Binomial name
- Carpobrotus edulis (L.) N.E.Br

Synonyms
- Abryanthemum edule (L.) Rothm.; Carpobrotus edulis var. chrysophthalmus C.D.Preston & P.D.Sell; Mesembryanthemum edule L.

= Carpobrotus edulis =

Species of succulent

Carpobrotus edulis is a creeping plant with succulent leaves in the fig-marigold family Aizoaceae, native to South Africa. Its common names include hottentot-fig, sour fig, ice plant, highway ice plant, or vygie.

== Description ==
Carpobrotus edulis is a creeping, mat-forming succulent species. It grows year round, with individual shoot segments growing more than 1 m (3 ft) per year. It can grow to at least 50 m (165 ft) in diameter. The leaves are a dull-green or yellow-green colour that may fade to pink with age. They are very slightly curved and have serrated sides near the tips.

The yellow flowers are produced from April to October, and range from 6.4 to 15.2 centimetres (2 1/2 to 6 inches) in diameter. Two of the calyx lobes are longer, extending further than the petals. The flowers open in the morning in bright sunlight and close at night. The receptacle is somewhat wedge-shaped, tapering down to the pedicel. The fruit is multi-chambered, ripening from green to yellow.

=== Chemistry ===
C. edulis contains rutin, neohesperidin, hyperoside, catechin and ferulic acid; these contribute to the antibacterial properties of the plant. It also contains procyanidins and propelargonidins.

=== Similar species ===
C. edulis can be distinguished from most of its close relatives by the size and yellow colour of its flowers. The smaller flowers of C. chilensis, with which it hybridizes readily, are 3.8 to 6.4 cm (1 1/2 to 2 1/2 in) in diameter and deep magenta.

== Taxonomy ==
The species was first described as Mesembryanthemum edule by Carl Linnaeus in 1759. It was transferred to the genus Carpobrotus by Nicholas Edward Brown in 1926. It is the type species of the genus.

Some sources accept three varieties:

- Carpobrotus edulis var. chrysophthalmus C.D.Preston & P.D.Sell
- Carpobrotus edulis var. edulis
- Carpobrotus edulis var. rubescens Druce

Plants of the World Online treats Carpobrotus edulis var. rubescens as a synonym of Carpobrotus × accedens, the hybrid between Carpobrotus acinaciformis and C. edulis, and sinks the others into the species.

== Distribution and habitat ==
The sour fig grows on coastal and inland slopes in South Africa from Namaqualand in the Northern Cape through the Western Cape to the Eastern Cape. It is often seen as a pioneer on disturbed sites.

== Ecology ==
The flowers are pollinated by solitary bees, honey bees, carpenter bees, and many beetle species. Leaves are eaten by tortoises. Flowers are eaten by antelopes and baboons. Fruits are eaten by baboons, rodents, porcupines, antelopes, who also disperse the seeds. The clumps provide shelter for snails, lizards, and skinks. Puff adders and other snakes, such as the Cape cobra, are often found in Carpobrotus clumps, where they ambush the small rodents attracted by the fruits.

=== As an invasive species ===
Carpobrotus edulis has naturalised in many other regions throughout the world, and is an invasive species in several parts, notably Australia, California and the Mediterranean, all of which have similar climates. The species has escaped from cultivation and has become invasive, posing a serious ecological problem by forming vast monospecific zones, lowering biodiversity, and competing directly with several threatened or endangered plant species for nutrients, water, light, and space.

The success of C. edulis as an invader is linked to its stoloniferous growth habit and clonal integration, traits commonly associated with invasive species. Physiological integration between ramets increases survival, biomass accumulation and clonal spread especially where competing with native species. The species often exhibits greater phenotypic plasticity than many native species, enabling it to establish and expand into under contrasting conditions including shaded coastal cliffs and nutrient-enriched sites. Such plasticity has raised concerns about its continual spread, especially in the face of changing climatic conditions.

Through hybridization, invasive C. edulis can gain genetic diversity and novel traits that further enhance its adaptability. The species readily engages in genetic exchanges with other Carpobrotus, such as C. chilensis, leading to hybrid variants with unique genetic combinations that allow them to thrive and outcompete native flora. Analysis of chloroplast DNA has revealed a large amount of genetic similarities between C. edulis and C. chilensis, indicating that the two may share a common ancestor.

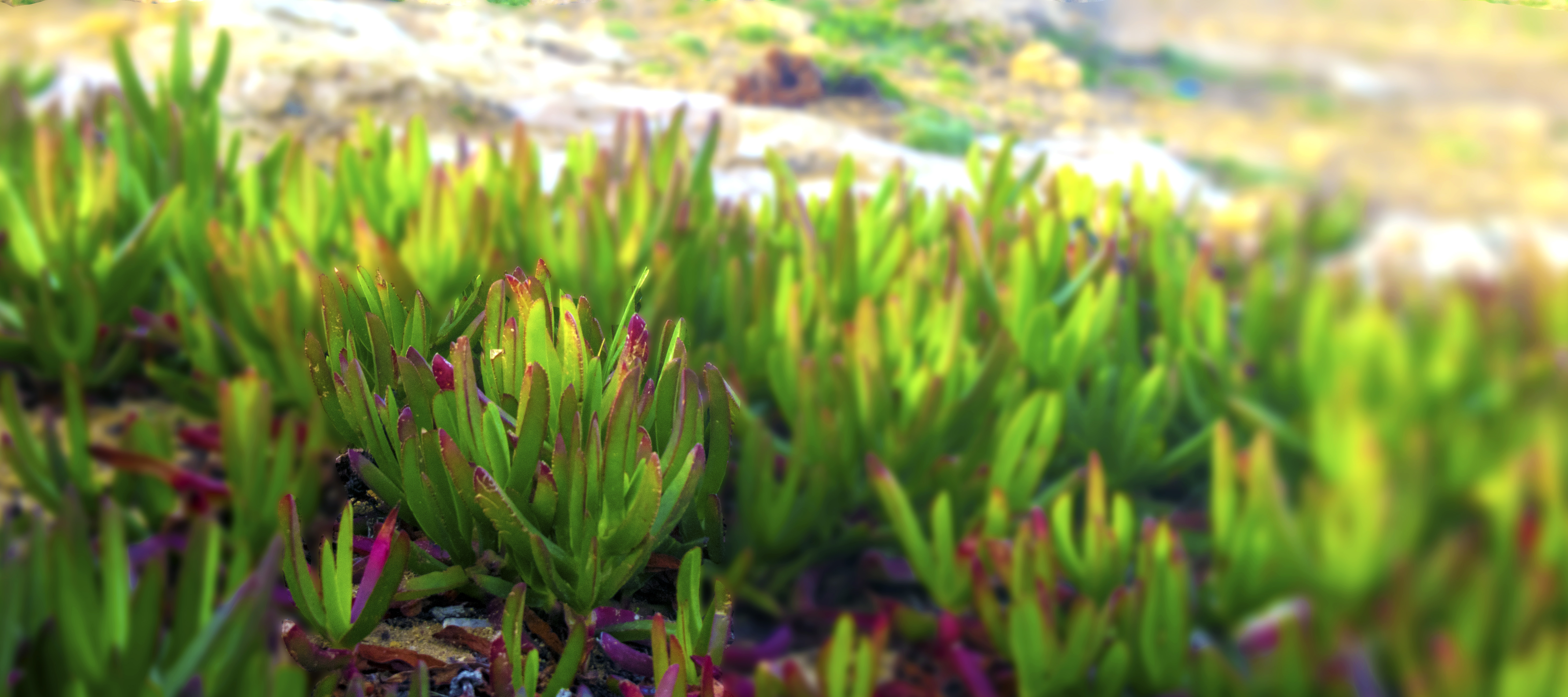
Found at Cape Angela in Bizerte, Tunisia, near the Mediterranean Sea

==== Ireland ====
Recorded as a garden escape from County Down, in the south and east and on the cliffs of Howth Head, County Dublin.

==== Mediterranean ====
On the Mediterranean coast, Carpobrotus has spread out rapidly and now parts of the coastline are completely covered. Moreover, another invasive species, the black rat, has been shown to enhance the spreading of the ice plant through its feces. As the ice plant represents a food resource for the rat, both benefit from each other which is referred to as invasive mutualism.

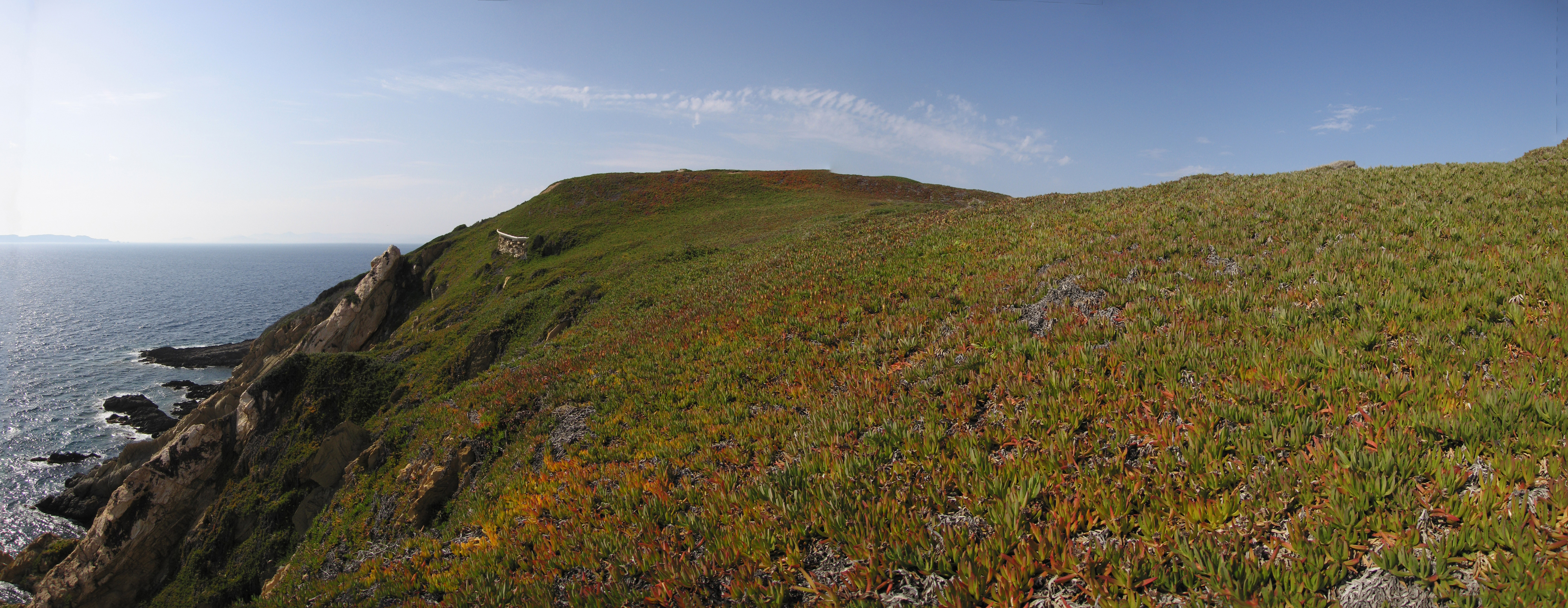
Example of an area completely covered with ice plant on a French Mediterranean island, Bagaud island, in the Port-Cros National Park

==== New Zealand ====
In New Zealand forms monocultures and has taken over vast areas of coastal sand dune ecosystem. C. edulis and its hybrids are classed as unwanted organisms and are listed on the National Pest Plant Accord.

==== North America ====
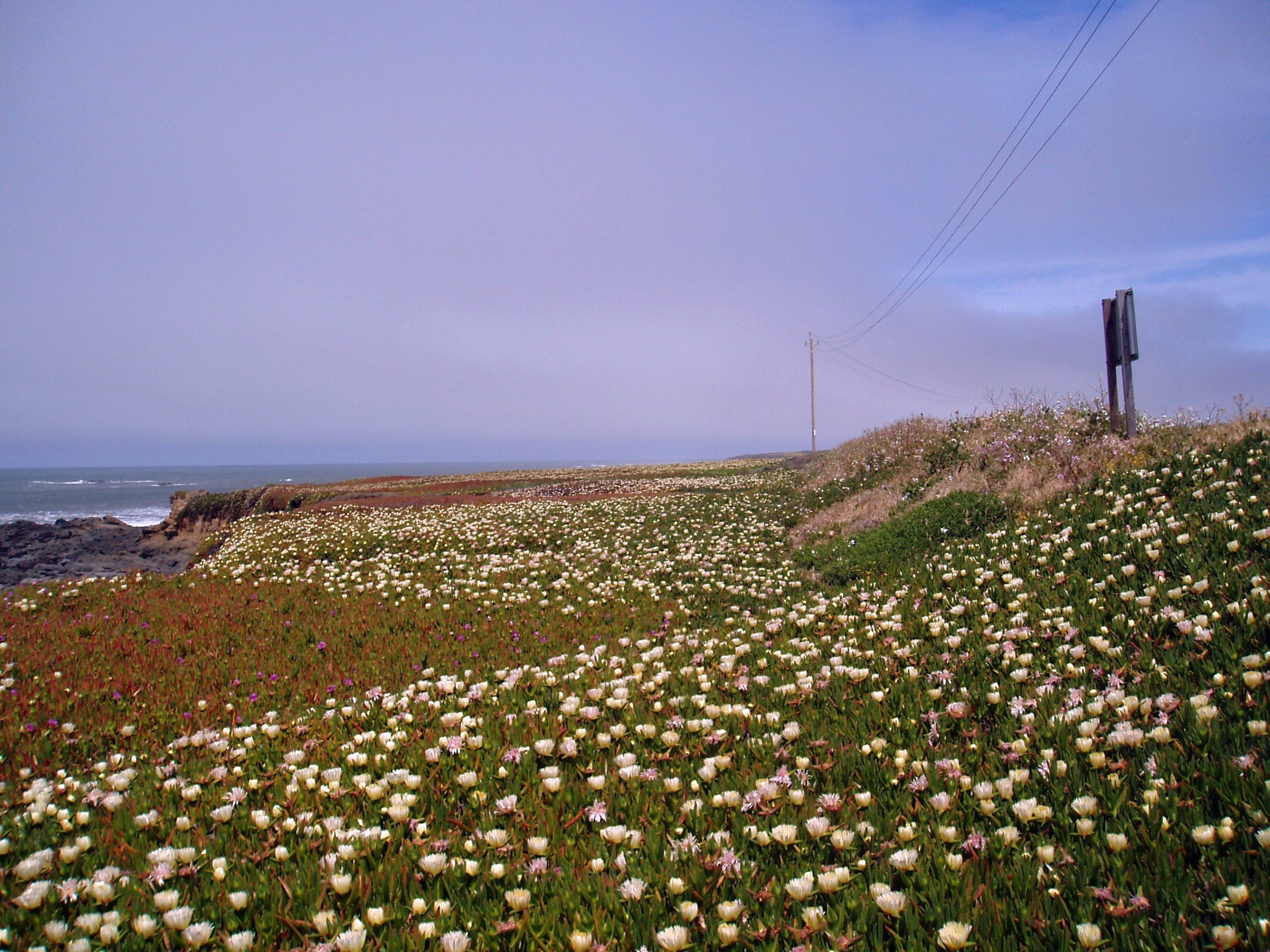
The ice plant forms large monogeneric zones along the California coast. Here Carpobratus edulis (yellow flowers) and Carpobrotus chilensis (magenta flowers) grow in separate patches

Although the ice plant may have arrived by ship as early as the 16th century, C. edulis was actively introduced in the early 1900s to stabilize dunes and soil along railroad tracks; it was later put to use by Caltrans for ground cover along freeway embankments. Thousands of acres were planted in California until the 1970s. It easily spreads by seed (hundreds per fruit) and from segmentation (any shoot segment can produce roots). Its succulent foliage, bright yellow flowers, and resistance to some harsh coastal climatic conditions (salt) have also made it a favored garden plant. The ice plant was, for several decades, widely promoted as an ornamental plant, and it is still available at some nurseries. Ice plant foliage can turn a vibrant red to yellow in color. Despite its use as a soil stabilizer, it actually exacerbates and speeds up coastal erosion. It holds great masses of water in its leaves, and its roots are very shallow. In the rainy season, the added weight on unstable sandstone slopes and dunes increases the chances of slope collapse and landslides.

The ice plant is still abundant along highways, beaches, on military bases, and in other public and private landscapes. It spreads beyond landscape plantings and has invaded foredune, dune scrub, coastal bluff scrub, coastal prairie, and, most recently, maritime chaparral communities. In California, the ice plant is found in coastal habitats from north of Eureka, south at least as far as Rosarito in Baja California. It is intolerant of frost, and is not found far inland or at elevations greater than about 500 ft (150 m).

Flowering occurs almost year-round, beginning in February in southern California and continuing until the autumn in northern California, with flowers present for at least a few months in any given population.

==== Removal of plants ====
Control of ice plants can be attempted by pulling out individual plants by hand, or with the use of earth-moving machinery such as a skid-steer or tractor, though it is necessary to remove buried stems, and mulch the soil to prevent re-establishment. For chemical control, glyphosate herbicides are used. Because of the high water content of shoot tissues, burning of live or dead plants is not a useful method of control or disposal.

== Uses ==
The fruit is edible (as with some other members of the family Aizoaceae), as are its leaves. In South Africa the sour fig's ripe fruit are gathered and either eaten fresh or made into a very tart jam.

The different parts of C. edulis are used in different forms in traditional medicine, mainly in South Africa. Mostly, the fruits and flowers are eaten raw or cooked for fungal and bacterial infections. The leaves can be ingested orally for digestive problems or the juice can be sucked out to help a sore throat. The juice can also be mixed into a lotion base and used for external issues such as ringworm, bruises, sunburns, and cracked lips.
