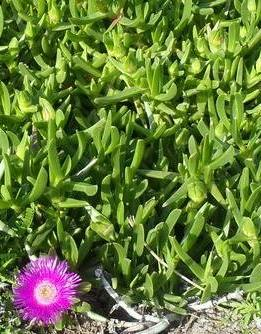

Scientific classification
- Kingdom: Plantae
- Clade: Tracheophytes
- Clade: Angiosperms
- Clade: Eudicots
- Order: Caryophyllales
- Family: Aizoaceae
- Genus: Carpobrotus
- Species: C. deliciosus

Binomial name
- Carpobrotus deliciosus (L. Bolus) L. Bolus

= Carpobrotus deliciosus =

Sweet Hottentots fig

Species of succulent

Carpobrotus deliciosus (commonly known as sweet Hottentots fig, perdevy, ghaukum, ghounavy) is a succulent perennial of the family Aizoaceae, native to a strip along the south coast of South Africa.

== Description ==
The flowers of this Carpobrotus ("Sour-fig") species range in colour from purple and pink to white, and these are followed by fruits that are less sour and more pleasant tasting that those of its relatives, hence its name.

The receptacle is distinctively subglobose or "bowl-shaped", and it constricts abruptly at the base, where it meets the pedicel. The top of the ovary is often raised in the centre.

Its leaves are almost straight (slightly subacinaciform) and curve mainly at the tip. They are a green to glaucous-green colour, sometimes becoming reddish.

== Distribution and habitat ==
It is indigenous to the coastal rocks, dunes and plains along the far southern coast of South Africa. This coastal strip extends along the whole of the Eastern Cape coast, but also extends into the Western Cape as far as Riversdale and into neighbouring KwaZulu-Natal.

Its sweet edible fruits are grazed by tortoises and other southern African animals, and are also used locally to make traditional preserves.

Of the other six Carpobrotus species which occur in South Africa, this species is particularly closely related to Carpobrotus muirii which occurs just to the west of its range, in the Western Cape.
