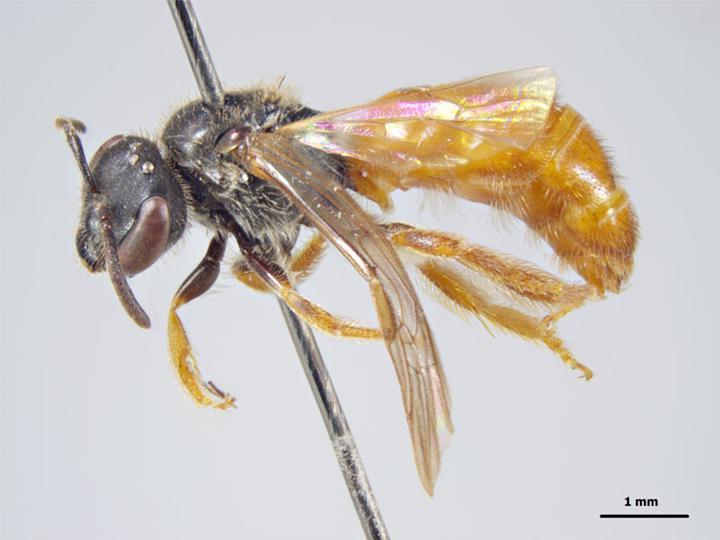
- Female
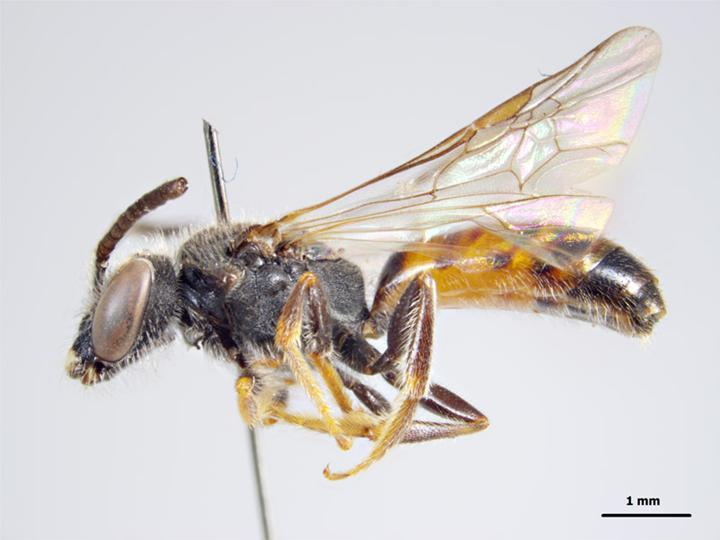
- Male

Scientific classification
- Kingdom: Animalia
- Phylum: Arthropoda
- Clade: Pancrustacea
- Class: Insecta
- Order: Hymenoptera
- Family: Halictidae
- Genus: Lasioglossum
- Species: L. disclusum

Binomial name
- Lasioglossum disclusum (Cockerell, 1914)

Synonyms
- Halictus disclusus Cockerell, 1914; Halictus boweni Cockerell, 1915; Halictus pertribuarius Rayment, 1935

= Lasioglossum disclusum =

Species of bee

Lasioglossum disclusum, or Lasioglossum (Enigmalictus) disclusum, is a species of bee in the family Halictidae and subfamily Halictinae. It is endemic to Australia. It was described by British-American entomologist Theodore Dru Alison Cockerell in 1914.

== Description ==
Male body length is about 6 mm. Integumental colouration is mainly black with reddish and pale-yellow markings, the abdomen partly chestnut-red; with white hair.

== Distribution and habitat ==
The species occurs in south-eastern Australia. Type localities include Eaglehawk Neck in Tasmania, and the Grampians in Victoria.

== Behaviour ==
The adults are flying mellivores. Flowering plants visited by the bees include Hypochaeris radicata, Correa lawrenceana, Leptecophylla parvifolia, Styphelia ericoides, Baeckea leptocaulis, Eucalyptus nitida, Leptospermum rupestre, Bursaria spinosa and Veronica formosa.

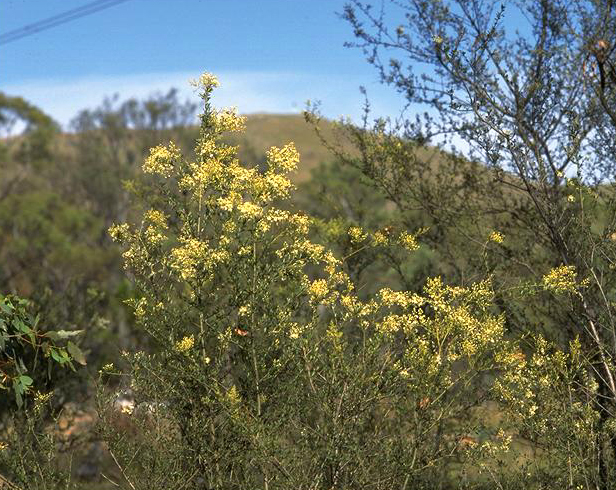
Bursaria spinosa (native blackthorn), a forage plant of the bees

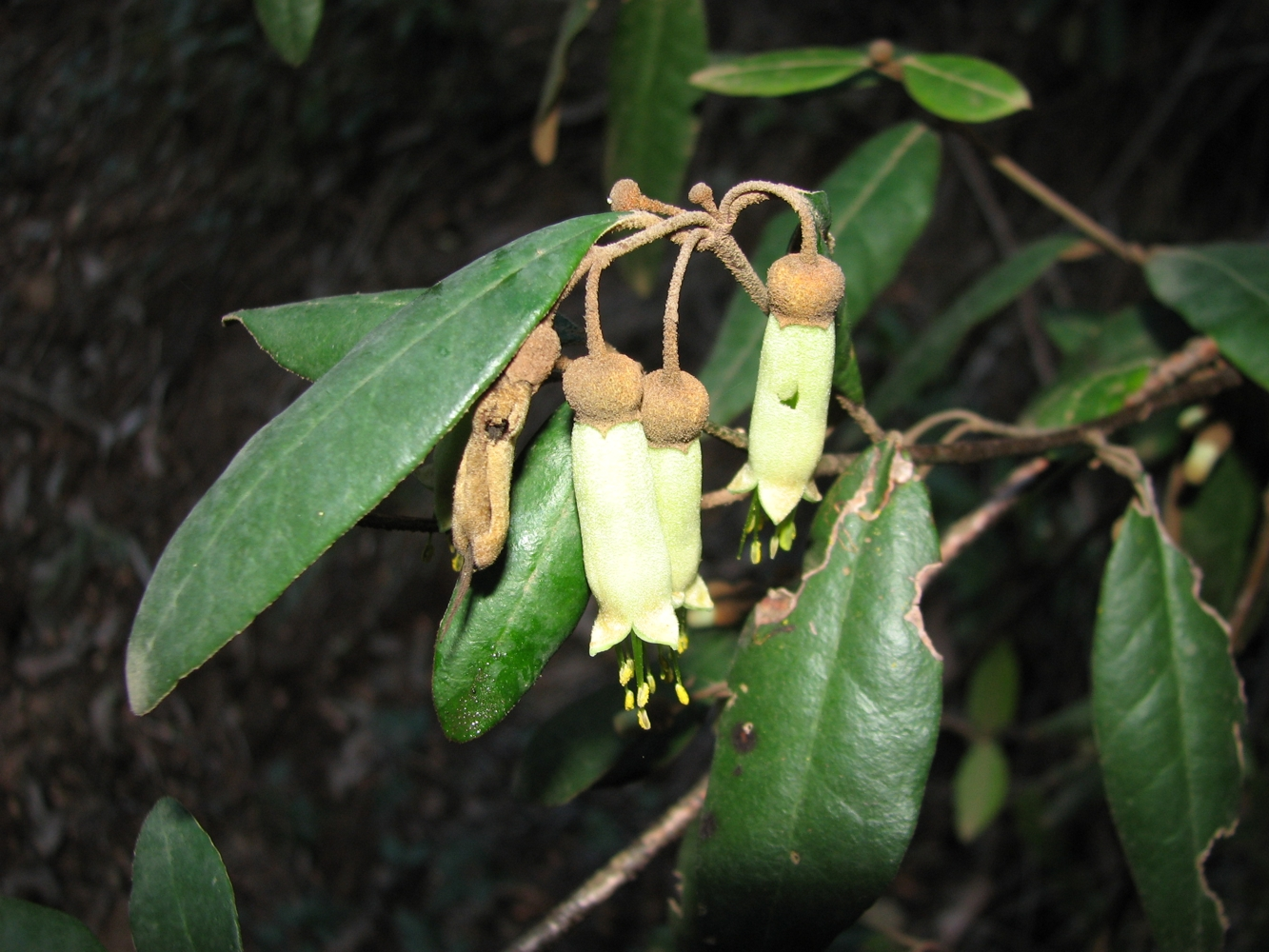
Flowers of Correa lawrenciana (mountain correa), a forage plant of the bees
