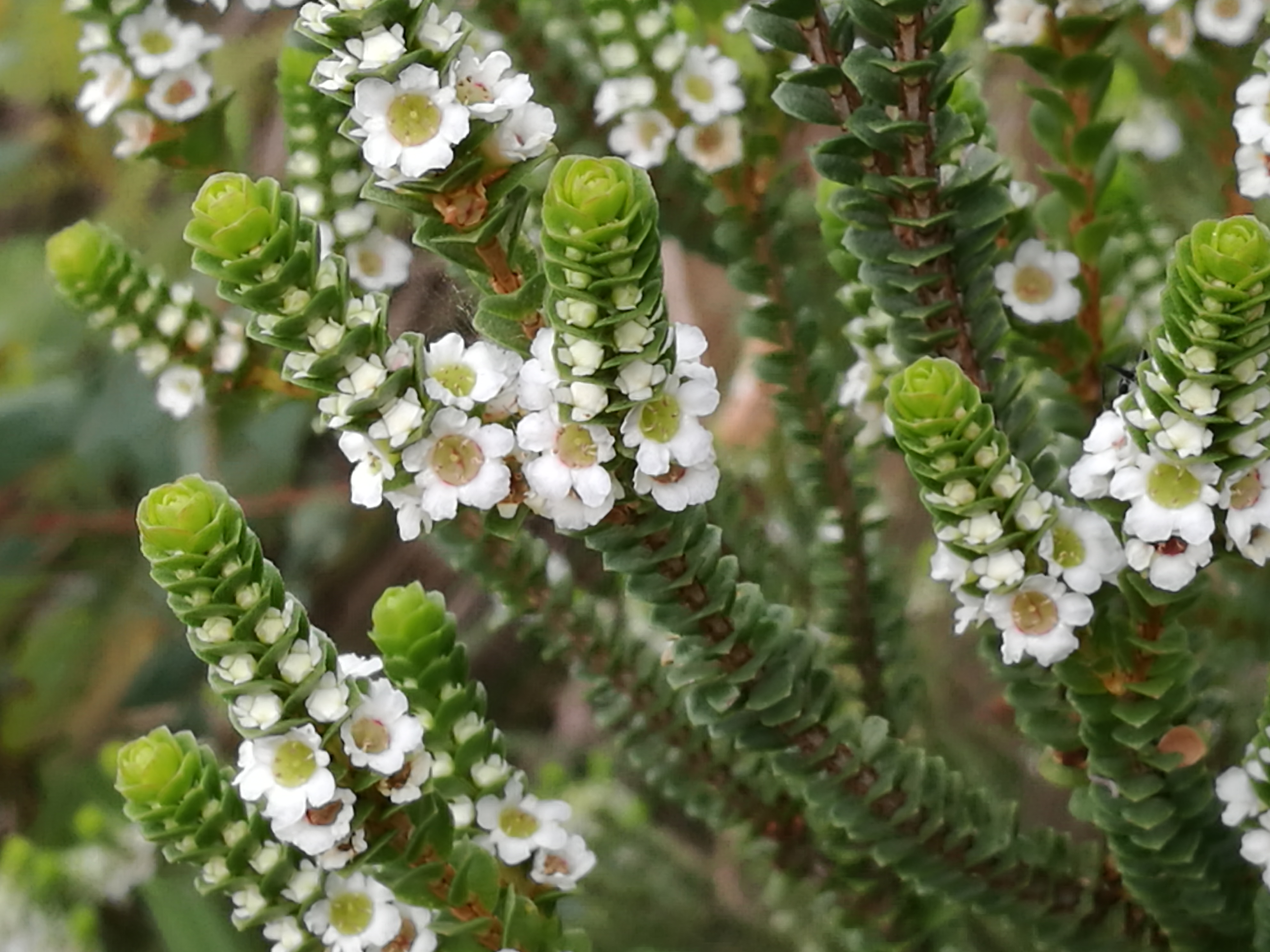
- Baeckea imbricata at Palm Beach

Scientific classification
- Kingdom: Plantae
- Clade: Tracheophytes
- Clade: Angiosperms
- Clade: Eudicots
- Clade: Rosids
- Order: Myrtales
- Family: Myrtaceae
- Genus: Baeckea
- Species: B. imbricata

Binomial name
- Baeckea imbricata (Gaertn.) Druce

Synonyms
- List: Baeckea crenulata (Sm.) DC. nom. illeg., nom. superfl.; Baeckea crenulata (Sm.) DC. var. crenulata; Baeckea crenulata var. tenella (Gaertn.) Benth.; Baeckea diosmoides Sieber ex DC.; Baeckea imbricata (Gaertn.) Hochr. isonym; Baeckea imbricata (Gaertn.) Domin isonym; Baeckea imbricata (Gaertn.) Druce var. imbricata; Baeckea imbricata var. tenella (Gaertn.) Hochr.; Baeckea imbricata var. typica Domin nom. inval.; Escallonia crenulata (Sm.) Schult. nom. illeg., nom. superfl.; Imbricaria crenulata Sm. nom. illeg., nom. superfl.; Jungia imbricata Gaertn.; Jungia tenella Gaertn.; Mollia imbricata (Gaertn.) J.F.Gmel.; Philadelphus tenellus Gaertn. nom. inval., pro syn.; Schidiomyrtus crenulata (Sm.) Schauer; Schidiomyrtus ericacea Miq. nom. inval., pro syn.; Schidiomyrtus sieberi Schauer nom. illeg.; Schidiomyrtus tenella (Gaertn.) Schauer; Schidiomyrtus tenella (Gaertn.) Schauer var. tenella; Schidiomyrtus tenellus Schauer orth. var.; Stereoxylon crenulata (Sm.) Poir. nom. illeg.

= Baeckea imbricata =

Heath myrtle

Species of flowering plant

Baeckea imbricata, commonly known as heath myrtle, is a species of flowering plant in the family Myrtaceae and is endemic to eastern Australia. It is a shrub with elliptical to egg-shaped or round leaves and small white flowers with five to twelve stamens.

== Description ==
Baeckea imbricata is a shrub that typically grows to a height up to 1.0 m (3 ft 3 in), sometimes to 1.6 m (5 ft 3 in) , and has flanged branchlets and grey, scaly bark. The leaves are elliptical to egg-shaped or round, 2.5–5.4 mm (0.098–0.213 in) long and 2.0–3.9 mm (0.079–0.154 in) wide on a petiole up to 0.3 mm (0.012 in) long. The flowers are 4.0–4.5 mm (0.16–0.18 in) in diameter and are borne singly in leaf axils, each flower on a pedicel usually 0.3–0.8 mm (0.012–0.031 in) long with bracteoles 1.5–2.5 mm (0.059–0.098 in) long that often persist until the flower opens. The sepals are oblong, 0.7–1.2 mm (0.028–0.047 in) long and the petals are white, more or less round and 1.4–1.6 mm (0.055–0.063 in) long. There are five to twelve stamens in groups of up to three. The ovary has two locules and the style is about 1 mm (0.039 in) long. The fruit is an oval capsule about 2 mm (0.079 in) long.

== Taxonomy ==
Heath myrtle was first formally described in 1788 by Joseph Gaertner who gave it the name Jungia imbricata in De Fructibus et Seminibus Plantarum. In 1917, George Claridge Druce changed the name to Baeckea imbricata in the supplement to The Botanical Exchange Club and Society of the British Isles Report for 1916. The specific epithet (imbricata) means "overlapping".

== Distribution and habitat ==
Baeckea imbricata grows in heathland in swampy places in near-coastal areas and on adjacent ranges from Cooloola National Park in south-eastern Queensland to Bawley Point in south-eastern New South Wales.
