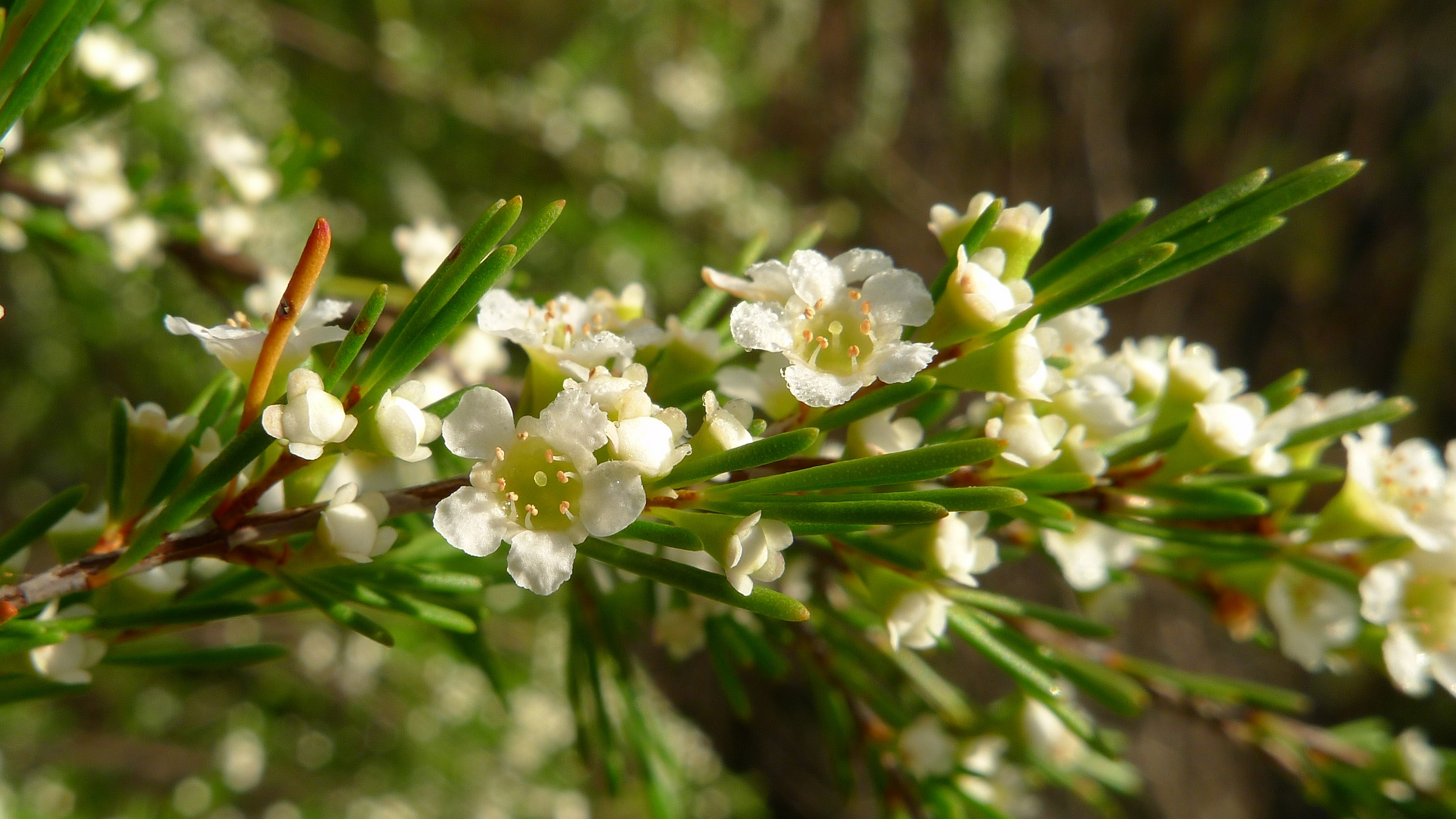
- Baeckea linifolia in Limeburners Creek National Park

Scientific classification
- Kingdom: Plantae
- Clade: Tracheophytes
- Clade: Angiosperms
- Clade: Eudicots
- Clade: Rosids
- Order: Myrtales
- Family: Myrtaceae
- Genus: Baeckea
- Species: B. linifolia

Binomial name
- Baeckea linifolia Rudge

Synonyms
- Baeckea linifolia Rudge f. linifolia Baeckea linifolia Rudge var. linifolia Baeckea trichophylla Sieber ex Spreng. Baeckea linifolia var. brevifolia F.Muell. ex Benth. Baeckea linifolia f. trichophylla (Sieber ex Spreng.) Domin; Baeckea linifolia var. brevifolia Ewart nom. illeg.

= Baeckea linifolia =

Swamp baeckea

Species of flowering plant

Baeckea linifolia, commonly known as swamp baeckea, weeping baeckea or flax-leaf heath myrtle, is a species of flowering plant in the family Myrtaceae and is endemic to eastern Australia. It is an erect shrub with linear leaves and small white flowers with eight to fifteen stamens.

== Description ==
Baeckea linifolia is an erect shrub that typically grows to a height of 1–3 m (3 ft 3 in – 9 ft 10 in) and has branches with drooping tips. The leaves are linear to more or less cylindrical, 5–15 mm (0.20–0.59 in) long and taper at both ends. The flowers are up to 5 mm (0.20 in) wide and arranged singly in leaf axils, each flower on a pedicel 1.5–2.0 mm (0.059–0.079 in) long with two linear bracteoles at the base, but that fall off as the flower opens. The sepal lobes are triangular and the petals are egg-shaped, white and 1.5–2.5 mm (0.059–0.098 in) long. There are eight to fifteen stamens with curved filaments, none of which is opposite the petals. The flat-topped ovary has two cells. Flowering occurs in most months, especially in spring and summer, and the fruit is a cup-like capsule about 2 mm (0.079 in) in diameter, containing angular seeds.

== Taxonomy and naming ==
Baeckea linifolia was first formally described in 1807 by Edward Rudge in Transactions of the Linnean Society of London from a specimen collected "near Port Jackson". The specific epithet (linifolia) is derived from the Latin words linum ("flax") and folium ("leaf"), giving a compound Latin adjective which describes the plant as having leaves like those of flax.

== Distribution and habitat ==
Swamp baeckea grows in heath in damp places, often near waterfalls and gullies and is found along the coast and adjacent ranges from south-east Queensland through New South Wales to the Cann River in north-eastern Victoria where it is rare.

Victorian plants typically have smaller, more rigid leaves in comparison with plants found in New South Wales and Queensland, and were previously included in Baeckea linifolia var. brevifolia F.Muell. ex Benth.

== Use in horticulture ==
This baeckea is reasonably well known in gardens and is a hardy plant in well-drained soil in a sunny or part-shaped situation. Once established it is moderately frost- and drought-tolerant.
