= Leioproctus pusillus =

Scientific classification
- Kingdom: Animalia
- Phylum: Arthropoda
- Clade: Pancrustacea
- Class: Insecta
- Order: Hymenoptera
- Family: Colletidae
- Genus: Leioproctus
- Species: L. pusillus

Binomial name
- Leioproctus pusillus (Cockerell, 1929)

Synonyms
- Paracolletes pusillus Cockerell, 1929

Species of bee

Leioproctus pusillus, or Leioproctus (Exleycolletes) pusillus, is a species of bee in the family Colletidae and subfamily Colletinae. It is endemic to Australia. It was described by British-American entomologist Theodore Dru Alison Cockerell in 1929.

== Description ==
Colouration is mainly black; the hair white.

== Distribution and habitat ==
The species occurs in Western Australia. The type locality is Geraldton.

== Behaviour ==
The adults are solitary flying mellivores that nest gregariously in the ground. Flowering plants visited by the bees include Baeckea pentagonantha and Hakea erinacea.

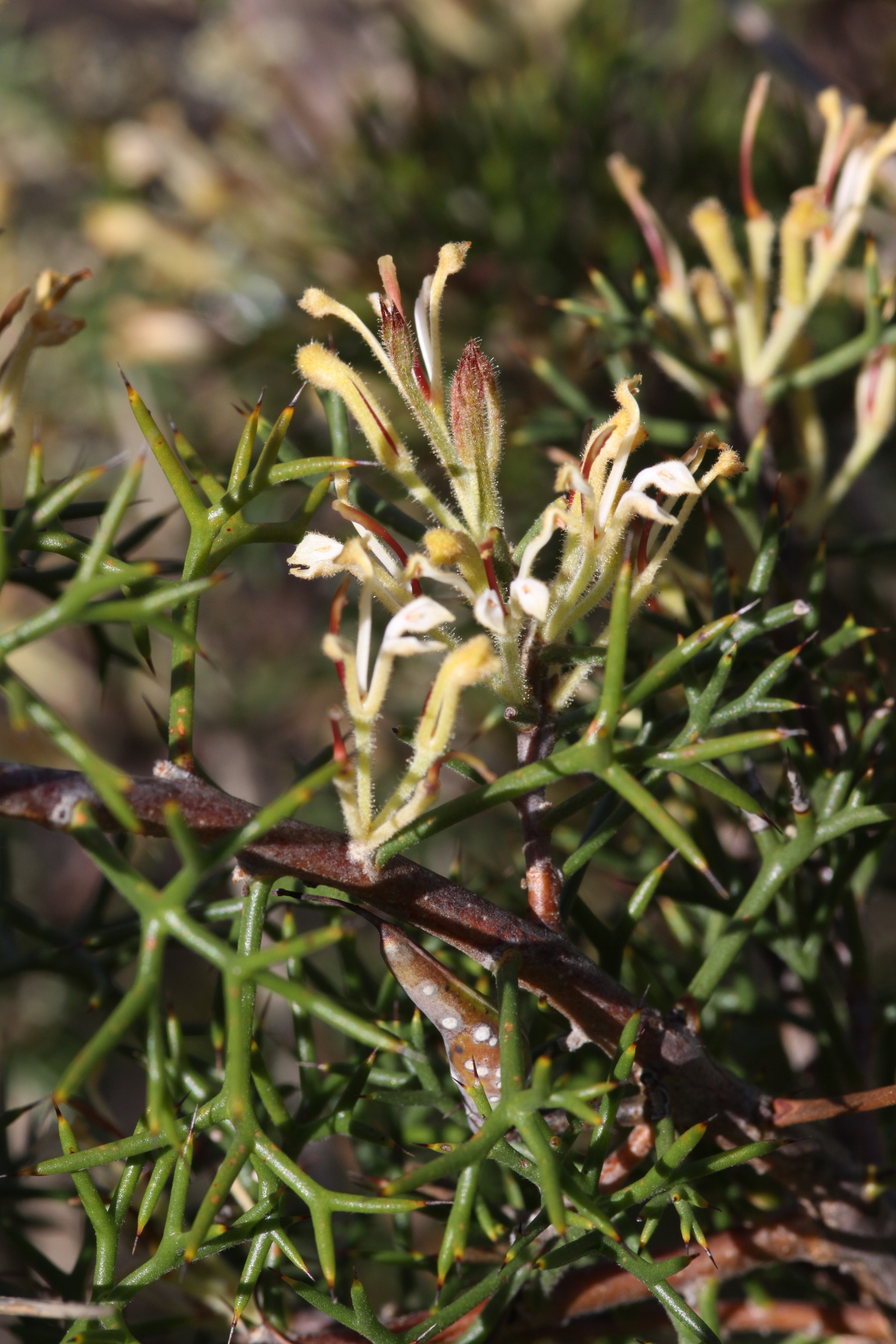
Hakea erinacea (hedgehog hakea), a forage plant of the bees
