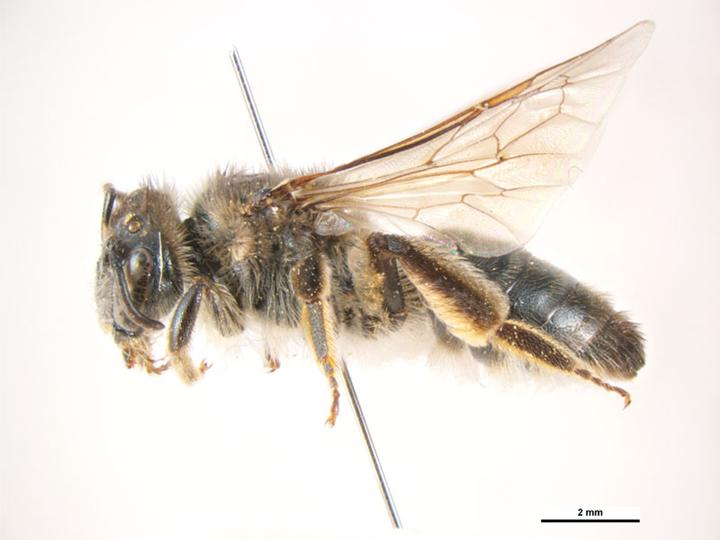
- Female

Scientific classification
- Kingdom: Animalia
- Phylum: Arthropoda
- Clade: Pancrustacea
- Class: Insecta
- Order: Hymenoptera
- Family: Colletidae
- Genus: Leioproctus
- Species: L. obscurus

Binomial name
- Leioproctus obscurus (Smith, 1853)

Synonyms
- Lamprocolletes obscurus Smith, 1853; Paracolletes semilautus Cockerell, 1905; Paracolletes hobartensis Cockerell, 1906; Paracolletes stewarti Rayment, 1947

= Leioproctus obscurus =

Species of bee

Leioproctus obscurus, or Leioproctus (Leioproctus) obscurus, is a species of bee in the family Colletidae and subfamily Colletinae. It is endemic to Australia. It was described by English entomologist Frederick Smith in 1853.

== Distribution and habitat ==
The species occurs across Australia. Type localities include Hobart in Tasmania and Mount Buffalo in Victoria.

== Behaviour ==
The adults are flying mellivores. Flowering plants visited by the bees include Leptospermum rupestre.

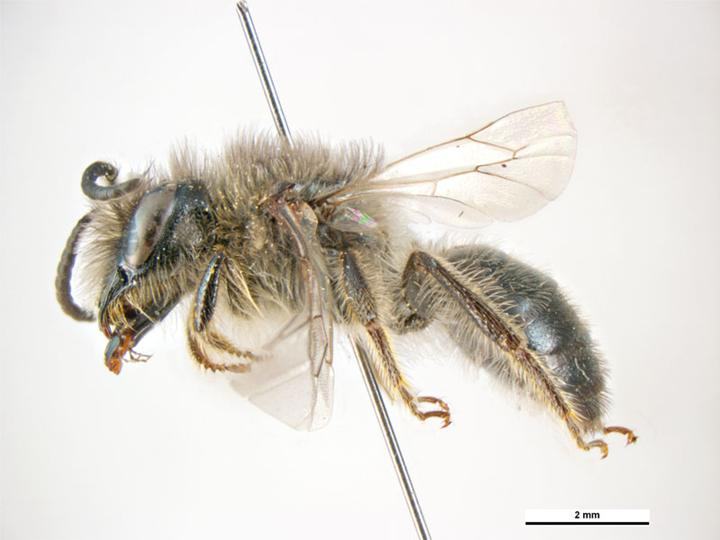
Male
