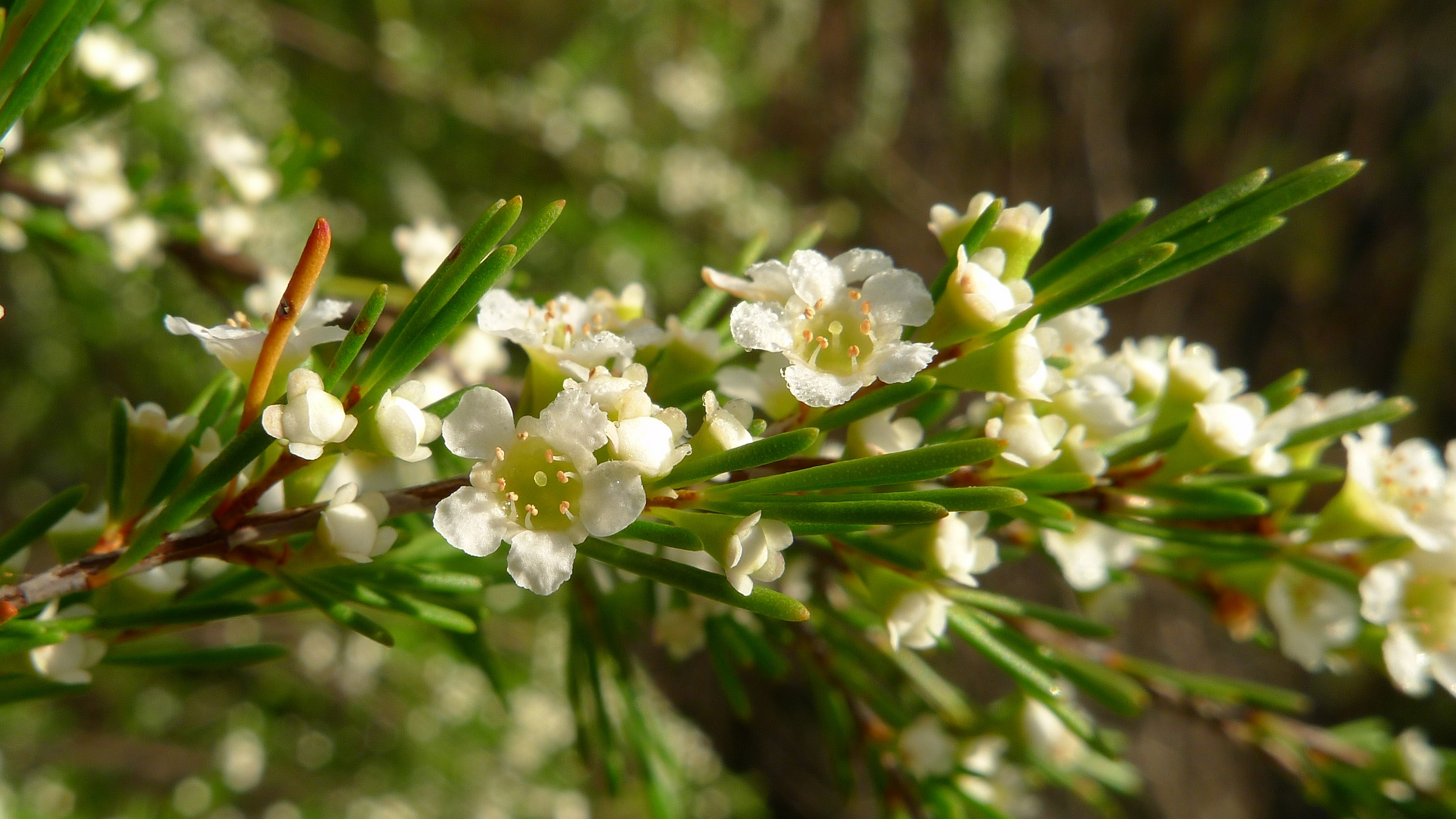
- Baeckea linifolia

Scientific classification
- Kingdom: Plantae
- Clade: Embryophytes
- Clade: Tracheophytes
- Clade: Spermatophytes
- Clade: Angiosperms
- Clade: Eudicots
- Clade: Rosids
- Order: Myrtales
- Family: Myrtaceae
- Subfamily: Myrtoideae
- Tribe: Chamelaucieae
- Genus: Baeckea; L.

Synonyms
- List: Allostis Raf.; Baechea Colla orth. var.; Baecka Cothen. orth. var.; Baeckea L. sect. Baeckea; Baeckea sect. Imbricaria Baill.; Baeckea sect. Jungia Baill.; Baeckea sect. Schidiomyrtus (Schauer) F.Muell.; Baeckea subg. Archibaeckea Nied.; Baeckea L. subg. Baeckea; Baeckia Andrews orth. var.; Beckea Pers. orth. var.; Boeckia Meredith orth. var.; Drosodendron M.Roem.; Imbricaria Sm. nom. illeg.; Jungia Gaertn. nom. illeg., nom. superfl.; Mollia J.F.Gmel. nom. rej.; Murrinea Raf.; Neuhofia Stokes; Schidiomyrtus Schauer; Tjongina Adans.

= Baeckea =

Genus of flowering plants

Baeckea is a genus of flowering plants in the myrtle family, Myrtaceae, all but one endemic to Australia. Plants in the genus Baeckea are shrubs or small trees with leaves arranged in opposite pairs, white to deep pink flowers with five sepals and five petals, and five to fifteen stamens that are shorter than the petals.

== Description ==
Plants in the genus Baeckea are glabrous shrubs, sometimes small trees, usually with the leaves arranged in opposite pairs or decussate. The flowers are usually arranged singly in leaf axils on a pedicel with two bracteoles at the base but that sometimes fall off as the flower opens. There are five sepals and five white to deep pink, more or less round petals that are free from each other. Five to fifteen stamens are arranged in a single row and are shorter that the petals and open by parallel slits. The fruit is a capsule containing many seeds.

== Distribution and habitat ==
Species in the genus Baeckea are endemic to Australia, apart from B. frutescens that also occurs in Malesia.

== Taxonomy ==
The genus Baeckea was first formally described in 1753 by Carl Linnaeus in his Species Plantarum. The genus is named in honor of the Swedish physician Abraham Bäck (or Baeck) (1713–1795).

Many species formerly placed in the genus are currently included in the genera Balaustion, Euryomyrtus, Harmogia, Kardomia, Oxymyrrhine, Rinzia, Sannantha, Seorsus and Triplarina.

The closest genera to Baeckea are the fleshy-fruited Myrcianthes and Acmena, and the dry-fruited Angophora and Backhousia.

=== Species ===
The following species are recognised in the genus Baeckea:

- Baeckea brevifolia (Rudge) DC. (N.S.W.)
- Baeckea diosmifolia Rudge – fringed baeckea (Qld., N.S.W.)
- Baeckea elderiana Pritz. (W.A.)
- Baeckea frutescens L. (S.E. Asia, New Guinea, Qld., N.S.W.)
- Baeckea gunniana S.Schauer ex Walp. – alpine baeckea (N.S.W., Vic., Tas.)
- Baeckea imbricata (Gaertn.) Druce – heath myrtle (Qld., N.S.W.)
- Baeckea kandos A.R.Bean (N.S.W.)
- Baeckea latifolia (Benth.) A.R.Bean (N.S.W., Vic.)
- Baeckea leptocaulis Hook.f. (Tas.)
- Baeckea leptophylla (Turcz.) Domin (W.A.)
- Baeckea linifolia Rudge – swamp baeckea, weeping baeckea, flax-leaf heath myrtle (Qld., N.S.W., Vic.)
- Baeckea muricata C.A.Gardner (W.A.)
- Baeckea omissa A.R.Bean (Qld., N.S.W.)
- Baeckea pentagonantha F.Muell. (W.A.)
- Baeckea robusta F.Muell. (W.A.)
- Baeckea staminosa Pritz. (W.A.)
- Baeckea subcuneata F.Muell. (W.A.)
- Baeckea trapeza A.R.Bean (Qld.)
- Baeckea utilis F.Muell. ex Miq. – mountain baeckea (N.S.W., A.C.T., Vic.)
