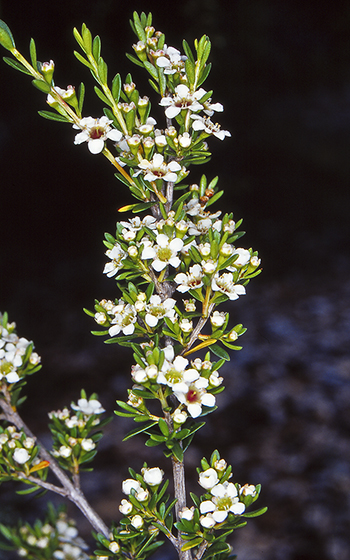
- In the Australian National Botanic Gardens

Scientific classification
- Kingdom: Plantae
- Clade: Tracheophytes
- Clade: Angiosperms
- Clade: Eudicots
- Clade: Rosids
- Order: Myrtales
- Family: Myrtaceae
- Genus: Baeckea
- Species: B. latifolia

Binomial name
- Baeckea latifolia (Benth.) A.R.Bean

Synonyms
- Baeckea gunniana var. latifolia Benth.; Baeckea utilis var. latifolia (Benth.) J.H.Willis

= Baeckea latifolia =

Species of flowering plant

Baeckea latifolia is a species of flowering plant in the family Myrtaceae and is endemic to south-eastern continental Australia. It is a shrub with broadly elliptic leaves and small white flowers with six to eight stamens.

== Description ==
Baeckea latifolia is an erect shrub that typically grows to a height of 1–3 m (3 ft 3 in – 9 ft 10 in) and has arching branches. The leaves are elliptic to egg-shaped with the narrower end towards the base, 6–9 mm (0.24–0.35 in) long and 2–6 mm (0.079–0.236 in) wide on a petiole 1.2–1.5 mm (0.047–0.059 in) long. The flowers are about 6 mm (0.24 in) in diameter and are borne singly in leaf axils, each flower on a pedicel about 3 mm (0.12 in) long. The sepals are oblong, 1.2–1.4 mm (0.047–0.055 in) long and the petals are white, more or less round and 2.7–3.0 mm (0.11–0.12 in) long. There are six to eight stamens in groups of up to three, the ovary has two locules and the style is about 1.5 mm (0.059 in) long. Flowering occurs in January and February and the fruit is a cylindrical capsule 3.0–3.8 mm (0.12–0.15 in) long.

== Taxonomy ==
This baeckea was first formally described in 1867 by George Bentham who gave it the name Baeckea gunniana var. latifolia in Flora Australiensis from specimens collected by Ferdinand von Mueller in "Baw-Baw Mountains. In 1997, Anthony Bean raised the variety to species status as Baeckea latifolia in the journal Telopea. The specific epithet (latifolia) means "broad-leaved".

== Distribution and habitat ==
Baeckea latifolia grows in the edges of snow gum woodlands and in grassland at altitudes above 1,300 m (4,300 ft) in eastern Victoria and southern New South Wales.
