= Scheuerman =

Scheuerman is a surname. Notable people with the surname include:

- Ross Scheuerman (born 1993), American football player
- Sharm Scheuerman (1934–2010), American basketball player and coach
- William Scheuerman (born 1965), American political philosopher

== See also ==
- Scheuermann
