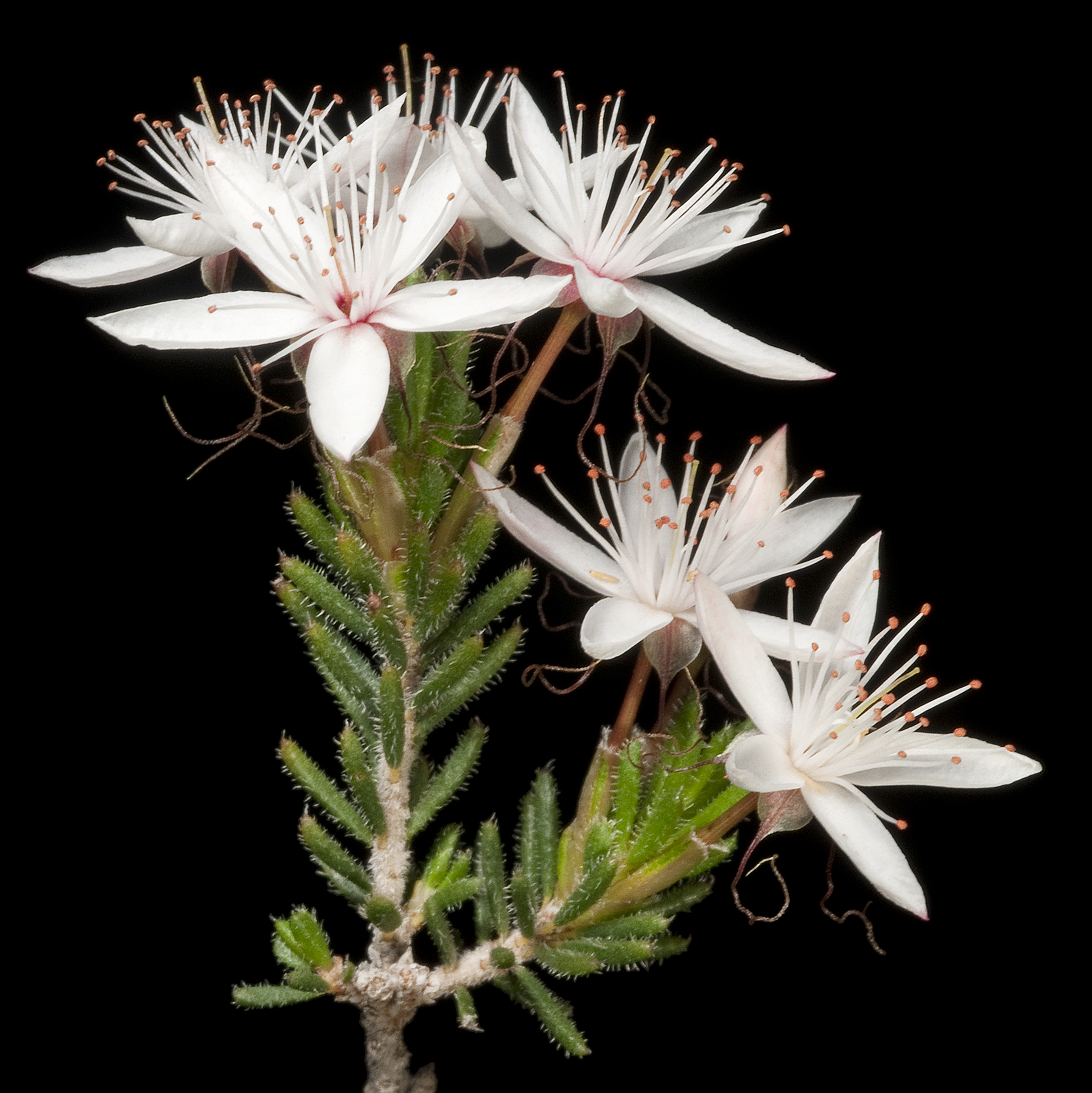

Scientific classification
- Kingdom: Plantae
- Clade: Tracheophytes
- Clade: Angiosperms
- Clade: Eudicots
- Clade: Rosids
- Order: Myrtales
- Family: Myrtaceae
- Genus: Calytrix
- Species: C. tetragona

Binomial name
- Calytrix tetragona Labill.

Synonyms
- List: Calycothrix behriana Schltdl.; Calycothrix billardierei Schauer nom. illeg., nom. superfl.; Calycothrix brunioides (A.Cunn.) Schauer; Calycothrix curtophylla (A.Cunn.) Schauer; Calycothrix diversifolia Turcz.; Calycothrix glabra (R.Br.) Hook.f.; Calycothrix glabra var. ciliata Hook.f.; Calycothrix glabra var. glaberrima Hook.f.; Calycothrix glabra (R.Br.) Hook.f. var. glabra; Calycothrix glabra var. virgata Hook.f.; Calycothrix leucantha Miq.; Calycothrix monticola Miq.; Calycothrix muelleri Miq.; Calycothrix rosea Miq.; Calycothrix scabra (DC.) Schauer; Calycothrix scabra var. minor Schltdl.; Calycothrix scabra (DC.) Schauer var. scabra; Calycothrix schlechtendalii Miq.; Calycothrix squarrosa Miq.; Calycothrix sullivani F.Muell. orth. var.; Calycothrix sullivanii F.Muell.; Calycothrix tetragona (Labill.) F.Muell.; Calycothrix virgata Schauer nom. illeg., nom. superfl.; Calythrix behriana Benth. nom. inval., pro syn.; Calythrix billardierii Benth. nom. inval., pro syn.; Calythrix brunioides A.Cunn. orth. var.; Calythrix curtophylla A.Cunn. orth. var.; Calythrix diversifolia B.D.Jacks. orth. var.; Calythrix flavescens var. curtophylla Benth. orth. var.; Calythrix leucantha Benth. nom. inval., pro syn.; Calythrix mitchellii S.Moore orth. var.; Calythrix monticola Benth. nom. inval., pro syn.; Calythrix muelleri Benth. nom. inval., pro syn.; Calythrix rosea Benth. nom. inval., pro syn.; Calythrix scabra DC. orth. var.; Calythrix schlechtendalii Benth. nom. inval., pro syn.; Calythrix squarrosa Benth. nom. inval., pro syn.; Calythrix sullivanii B.D.Jacks. orth. var.; Calythrix tetragona Benth. orth. var.; Calythrix tetraptera DC. orth. var.; Calythrix virgata A.Cunn. orth. var.; Calytrix brunioides A.Cunn.; Calytrix curtophylla A.Cunn.; Calytrix diversifolia (Turcz.) B.D.Jacks.; Calytrix ericoides A.Cunn.; Calytrix flavescens var.curtophylla (A.Cunn.) Benth.; Calytrix glabra R.Br.; Calytrix mitchellii S.Moore; Calytrix scabra DC.; Calytrix sullivanii (F.Muell.) B.D.Jacks.; Calytrix tetraptera A.Cunn. nom. illeg., nom. superfl.; Calytrix virgata A.Cunn.

= Calytrix tetragona =

Species of flowering plant

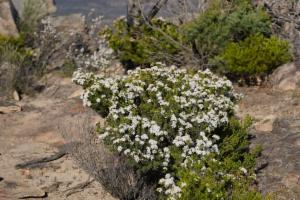
Habit in Grampians National Park

Calytrix tetragona, commonly known as common fringe-myrtle is a species of flowering plant in the myrtle family Myrtaceae and is endemic to all states of Australia. It is an erect or spreading shrub with linear to narrowly egg-shaped leaves and dense clusters of white or pink flowers with about 23 to 45 stamens.

== Description ==
Calytrix tetragona is a shrub that typically grows to a height of up to 0.5–2 m (1 ft 8 in – 6 ft 7 in). Its leaves are linear, oblong, egg-shaped, or lance-shaped to narrowly elliptic, 0.75–14 mm (0.030–0.551 in) long, 0.4–1.5 mm (0.016–0.059 in) wide, the base abruptly narrowing to a petiole 0.2–1.5 mm (0.0079–0.0591 in) long. The flowers are usually borne in dense clusters on a narrowly funnel-shaped peduncle 1.0–1.5 mm (0.039–0.059 in) long with elliptic, egg-shaped or more or less round bracteoles 2.5–4.75 mm (0.098–0.187 in) long. The floral tube is 7–15 mm (0.28–0.59 in) long with ten ribbs, and partly fused to the style. The sepals are joined up to 0.4 mm (0.016 in) at the base, the lobes egg-shaped, elliptic or egg-shaped with the narrower end towards the base, 0.75–2.5 mm (0.030–0.098 in) long and 1.0–2.75 mm (0.039–0.108 in) wide with an awn up to 17 mm (0.67 in) long. The petals are white to pink, elliptic to lance-shaped, 3.5–7.5 mm (0.14–0.30 in) long and 1.25–3.0 mm (0.049–0.118 in) wide with about 23 to 45 stamens 1.6–5 mm (0.063–0.197 in) long in a single row. Flowering occurs n most months with a peak from August to October.

== Taxonomy ==
Calytrix tetragona was first formally described in 1806 by Jacques Labillardière in his Novae Hollandiae Plantarum Specimen. The specific epithet (tetragona) means 'four-angled', referring to the decussate leaves.

== Distribution and habitat ==
Common fringe-myrtle occurs in each state of Australia and in the Australian Capital Territory. It grows on sandplains, sand dunes, and on granite outcrops in the Avon Wheatbelt, Coolgardie, Esperance Plains, Jarrah Forest, Mallee, Nullarbor, Swan Coastal Plain and Warren bioregions is found from near Bunbury to near Albany where grows on stunted jarrah and Banksia forest in the Esperance Plains, Jarrah Forest and Warren bioregions of south-western Western Australia. In South Australia it is common in a wide range of habitats including heath, mallee and open forest in the southern part of the state. The species is widespread in Victoria, especially in sandy and gravelly soils and on rock platforms. It is the only species of Calytrix in Tasmania, and is a common coastal shrub. In New South Wales, Queensland and the Australian Capital Territory, the species grows in heath, woodland and forest.

== Conservation status ==
This species of Calytrix is listed as "not threatened" by the Government of Western Australia Department of Biodiversity, Conservation and Attractions, and of "least concern" by the Government of Queensland.

== Use in horticulture ==
Common fringe-myrtle grows best in a sunny or lightly shaded situations in well-drained, lime-free. Some deep pink forms from near Keith appear to have potential as a garden subject.
