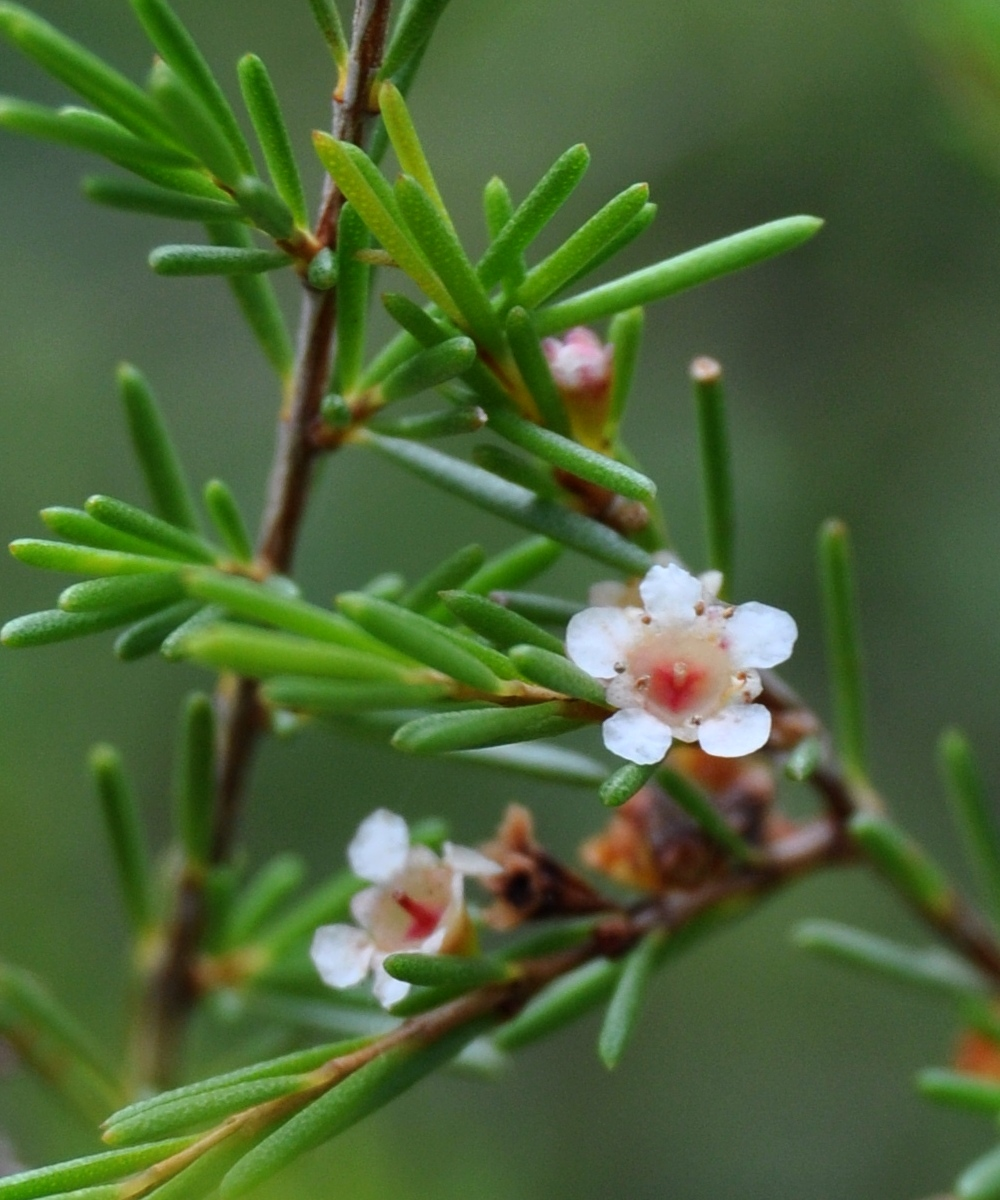
- In Belitung, Sumatra

Conservation status
- Least Concern (IUCN 3.1)

Scientific classification
- Kingdom: Plantae
- Clade: Tracheophytes
- Clade: Angiosperms
- Clade: Eudicots
- Clade: Rosids
- Order: Myrtales
- Family: Myrtaceae
- Genus: Baeckea
- Species: B. frutescens

Binomial name
- Baeckea frutescens L.

Synonyms
- List: Baeckea chinensis Gaertn.; Baeckea cochinchinensis Blume; Baeckea cumingiana S.Schauer; Baeckea ericoides Schltdl.; Baeckea sinensis Gaertn.; Baeckea stenophylla F.Muell.; Baeckea sumatrana Blume; Drosodendron rosmarinus (Lour.) M.Roem.; Neuhofia rosmarinifolia Stokes

= Baeckea frutescens =

Species of flowering plant

Baeckea frutescens is a species of flowering plant in the family Myrtaceae and is native to eastern southeastern China, Indochina, Malesia, New Guinea, and eastern Australia. It is a shrub with arching branches, linear leaves and white flowers with seven to thirteen stamens.

== Description ==
Baeckea frutescens is a shrub that typically grows to a height of up to 1 m (3 ft 3 in) and has arching branches. Its leaves are linear and often clustered on short side-branches, 4–10 mm (0.16–0.39 in) long and about 0.5 mm (0.020 in) wide on a petiole 0.5–0.6 mm (0.020–0.024 in) long. The flowers are arranged singly in leaf axils and are 3.5–5 mm (0.14–0.20 in) wide on a pedicel 1–2 mm (0.039–0.079 in) long. The five sepals are rounded-triangular, the five petals white, more or less round and 1.0–1.5 mm (0.039–0.059 in) long, and there are seven to thirteen stamens. Flowering mainly occurs in summer and the fruit is a capsule about 2 mm (0.079 in) in diameter.

== Taxonomy ==
Baeckea frutescens was first formally described in 1753 by Carl Linnaeus in Species Plantarum. The specific epithet (frutescens) means "becoming bushy or shrubby".

== Distribution and habitat ==
This baeckea grows in heath and open grassland from south-east China to eastern Australia. In Australia it grows in near-coastal areas as far south as Port Macquarie.

== Use in horticulture ==
This species' tiny leaves and branches make it a popular subject of bonsai.
