= Baeckea elderiana =

Scientific classification
- Kingdom: Plantae
- Clade: Tracheophytes
- Clade: Angiosperms
- Clade: Eudicots
- Clade: Rosids
- Order: Myrtales
- Family: Myrtaceae
- Genus: Baeckea
- Species: B. elderiana

Binomial name
- Baeckea elderiana E.Pritz.

Synonyms
- Baeckea baileyana C.A.Gardner

Species of flowering plant

Baeckea elderiana is a species of flowering plant in the family Myrtaceae and is endemic to central Western Australia.

== Description ==
Baeckea elderiana is an erect shrub that typically has a height of 0.3 to 2.5 metres (1 to 8 ft) and blooms between March and November producing white flowers.

== Taxonomy ==
The species was first formally described by the botanist Ernst Georg Pritzel in 1904 in Engler's journal Botanische Jahrbücher für Systematik, Pflanzengeschichte und Pflanzengeographie in an article by Pritzel and Ludwig Diels entitled Fragmenta Phytographiae Australiae occidentalis.

Specimens were originally collected by Richard Helms during the Elder expedition that left Adelaide in April 1891 and reached Geraldton in 1892. The species is named after Thomas Elder who had financed the expedition.

== Distribution and habitat ==
This baeckea is found on sandplains, rises and stony ridges in the Mid West, Wheatbelt and Goldfields-Esperance regions of Western Australia where it grows in sandy, loamy and stony soils.
