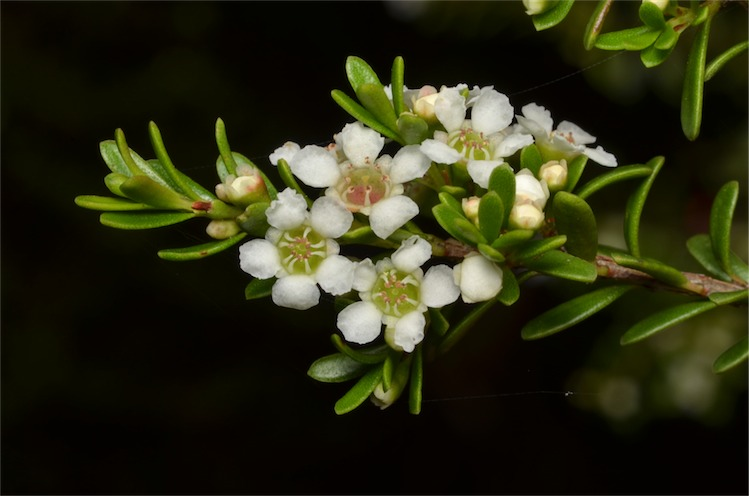
- Baeckea utilis in Barrington Tops National Park

Scientific classification
- Kingdom: Plantae
- Clade: Tracheophytes
- Clade: Angiosperms
- Clade: Eudicots
- Clade: Rosids
- Order: Myrtales
- Family: Myrtaceae
- Genus: Baeckea
- Species: B. utilis

Binomial name
- Baeckea utilis F.Muell. ex Miq.

= Baeckea utilis =

Mountain baeckea

Species of flowering plant

Baeckea utilis, commonly known as mountain baeckea, is a species of flowering plant in the family Myrtaceae and is endemic to south-eastern continental Australia. It is a shrub with elliptic to lance-shaped leaves with the narrower end towards the base and white flowers, usually with eight stamens.

== Description ==
Baeckea utilis is a slender, erect shrub that typically grows to a height of up to 3 m (9.8 ft) and has wiry stems. The leaves are elliptic to lance-shaped with the narrower end towards the base, 4–10 mm (0.16–0.39 in) long and 1–3 mm (0.039–0.118 in) wide on a petiole about 1 mm (0.039 in) long. The flowers are up to 5.5 mm (0.22 in) wide and arranged singly in leaf axils on a pedicel 1.6–2.5 mm (0.063–0.098 in) long with linear bracteoles 1.0–1.4 mm (0.039–0.055 in) long but that fall as the flowers open. The five sepals are oblong, 0.5–1.0 mm (0.020–0.039 in) long and the five petals are white, more or less round and 1.9–2.5 mm (0.075–0.098 in) long. There are usually eight stamens and the style is about 1.4 mm (0.055 in) long. Flowering mainly occurs from December to March and the fruit is hemispherical, 1.7–2.0 mm (0.067–0.079 in) long and 2.7–3.0 mm (0.11–0.12 in) wide.

== Taxonomy ==
Baeckea utilis was first formally described in 1856 by Friedrich Anton Wilhelm Miquel in Nederlandsch Kruidkundig Archief from an unpublished description by Ferdinand von Mueller. The specific epithet (utilis) means "useful".

== Distribution and habitat ==
Mountain baeckea grows in heath, forest or alpine herbfields and is common at higher altitudes south from Dorrigo in New South Wales, through the Australian Capital Territory to eastern Victoria.
