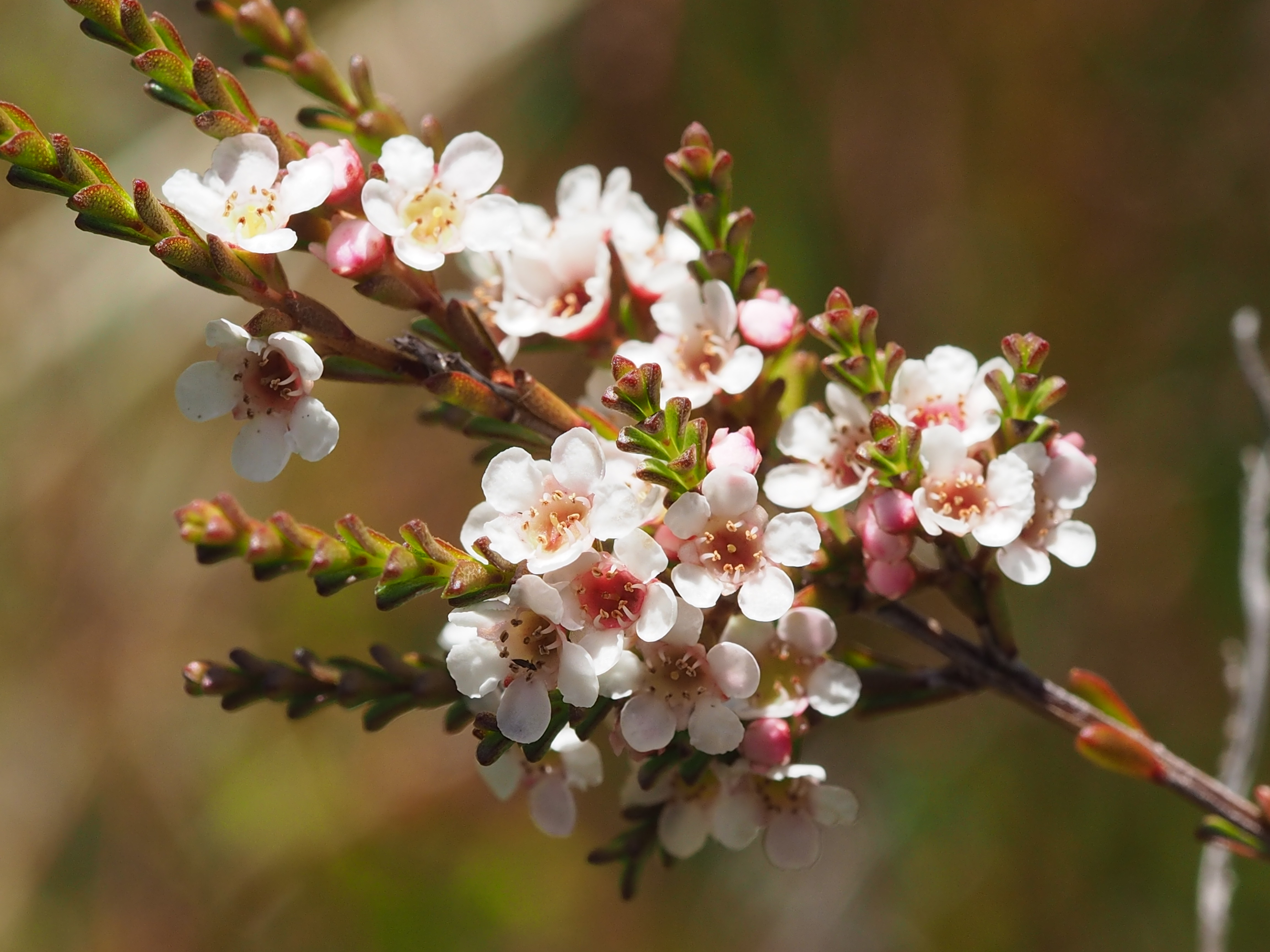
- In Cathedral Rock National Park

Scientific classification
- Kingdom: Plantae
- Clade: Tracheophytes
- Clade: Angiosperms
- Clade: Eudicots
- Clade: Rosids
- Order: Myrtales
- Family: Myrtaceae
- Genus: Baeckea
- Species: B. omissa

Binomial name
- Baeckea omissa A.R.Bean

= Baeckea omissa =

Species of flowering plant

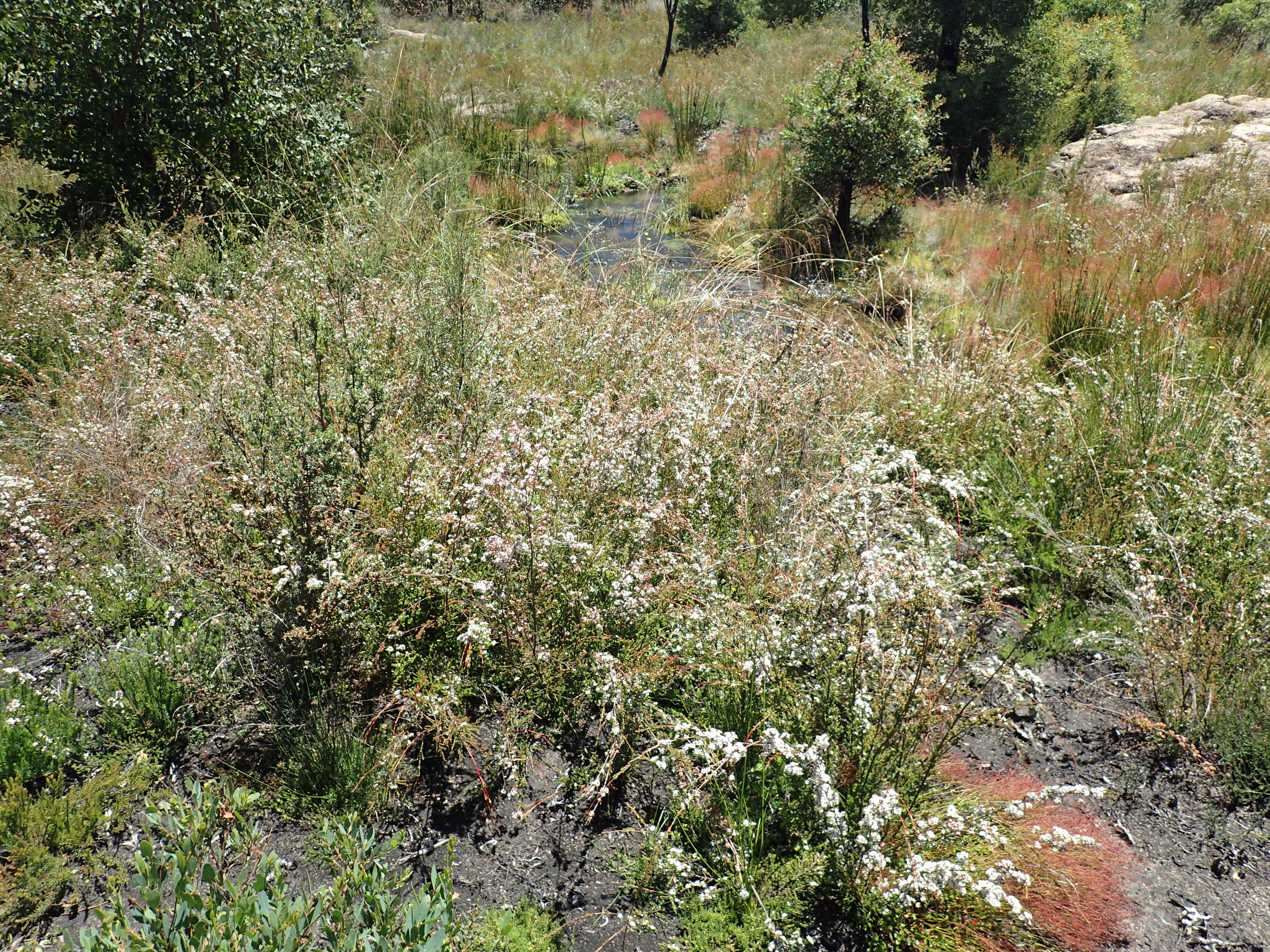
Habitat, recovering from bushfire

Baeckea omissa is a species of flowering plant in the family Myrtaceae and is endemic to eastern Australia. It is a shrub with egg-shaped to lance-shaped leaves with the narrower end towards the base and white flowers mostly with ten to fifteen stamens.

== Description ==
Baeckea omissa is a shrub that typically grows to a height of up to 2 m (6 ft 7 in). The leaves are egg-shaped to lance-shaped with the narrower end towards the base, 1.5–3.5 mm (0.059–0.138 in) long and 0.5–1.5 mm (0.020–0.059 in) wide on a petiole 0.1–0.2 mm (0.0039–0.0079 in) long. The flowers are up to 7 mm (0.28 in) wide and arranged singly in leaf axils on a pedicel about 1 mm (0.039 in) long with bracteoles 1–2 mm (0.039–0.079 in) long but that usually fall as the flowers open. The five sepals are 0.5–0.6 mm (0.020–0.024 in) long and the five petals are white, more or less round and 1.5–2.5 mm (0.059–0.098 in) long. There are usually ten to fifteen stamens and the style is about 0.7 mm (0.028 in) long. Flowering mainly occurs from October to February and the fruit is hemispherical, about 1.5 mm (0.059 in) long and 2.2 mm (0.087 in) wide.

== Taxonomy ==
Baeckea omissa was first formally described in 1997 by Anthony Bean in the journal Telopea from specimens he collected near Tenterfield in 1993. The specific epithet (omissa) means "neglected or overlooked", referring to the late recognition of this taxon.

== Distribution and habitat ==
This baeckea grows in heathy swamp and is common and widespread from near Stanthorpe in Queensland to the New England National Park and near Torrington in New South Wales.
