= Baeckea trapeza =

Scientific classification
- Kingdom: Plantae
- Clade: Tracheophytes
- Clade: Angiosperms
- Clade: Eudicots
- Clade: Rosids
- Order: Myrtales
- Family: Myrtaceae
- Genus: Baeckea
- Species: B. trapeza

Binomial name
- Baeckea trapeza A.R.Bean

Species of flowering plant

Baeckea trapeza is a species of flowering plant in the family Myrtaceae and is endemic to Queensland. It is a shrub with lance-shaped leaves with the narrower end towards the base, and white flowers with eight to eleven stamens.

== Description ==
Baeckea trapeza is a shrub that typically grows to a height of up to 1 m (3 ft 3 in) and has grey, scaly bark. The leaves are lance-shaped with the narrower end towards the base, 3.0–4.5 mm (0.12–0.18 in) long and 0.6–1.2 mm (0.024–0.047 in) long on a petiole about 0.4 mm (0.016 in) long. The flowers are up to 5.5 mm (0.22 in) wide on a pedicel 1.0–1.5 mm (0.039–0.059 in) long with linear bracteoles 1.3–2.0 mm (0.051–0.079 in) long but that fall as the flowers open. The five sepals are 0.4–1 mm (0.016–0.039 in) long and more or less round and the petals are 1.4–1.8 mm (0.055–0.071 in) long. There are eight to eleven stamens opposite the sepals and the style is about 0.7 mm (0.028 in) long. Flowering has been observed in January and April and the fruit is conical to bell-shaped capsule 2.5–3.0 mm (0.098–0.118 in) in long and 2.2–2.5 mm (0.087–0.098 in) wide.

== Taxonomy ==
Baeckea trapeza was first formally described in 1997 by Anthony Bean in the journal Telopea from specimens he collected on the Blackdown Tableland in 1996. The specific epithet (trapeza) means "a table", referring to the distribution of the species on the Blackdown Tableland.

== Distribution and habitat ==
This baeckea grows in open forest at altitudes between 700 and 800 m (2,300 and 2,600 ft) and is confined to the Blackdown Tableland in Queensland.
