= Baeckea robusta =

Scientific classification
- Kingdom: Plantae
- Clade: Tracheophytes
- Clade: Angiosperms
- Clade: Eudicots
- Clade: Rosids
- Order: Myrtales
- Family: Myrtaceae
- Genus: Baeckea
- Species: B. robusta

Binomial name
- Baeckea robusta F.Muell.

Synonyms
- Babingtonia robusta (F.Muell.) F.Muell.

Species of flowering plant

Baeckea robusta is a species of flowering plant in the family Myrtaceae and is endemic to an area along the west coast Western Australia. It is an erect and slender shrub that typically grows to a height of 0.9 to 2.6 metres (3.0 to 8.5 ft) and blooms between June and December producing white to white-pink flowers. It is found on sand plains and around limestone outcrops in the coastal parts of the Mid West and extending south into the north west of the Wheatbelt region of Western Australia where it grows in sandy soils over laterite or limestone.

The species was first formally described by Ferdinand von Mueller in 1864 in his book Fragmenta Phytographiae Australiae, from specimens collected near the Murchison River by Augustus Oldfield.

== See also ==
- List of Baeckea species
