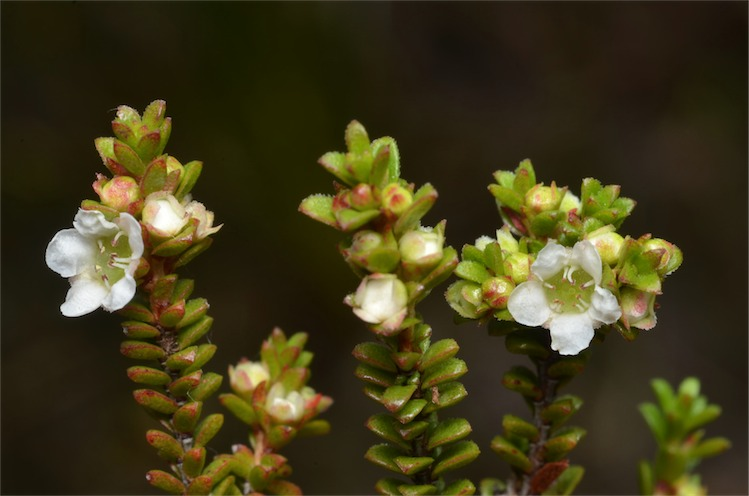
- Baeckea diosmifolia in Morton National Park

Scientific classification
- Kingdom: Plantae
- Clade: Tracheophytes
- Clade: Angiosperms
- Clade: Eudicots
- Clade: Rosids
- Order: Myrtales
- Family: Myrtaceae
- Genus: Baeckea
- Species: B. diosmifolia

Binomial name
- Baeckea diosmifolia Rudge

Synonyms
- Schidiomyrtus diosmifolia (Rudge) Schauer

= Baeckea diosmifolia =

Fringed baeckea

Species of flowering plant

Baeckea diosmifolia, commonly known as fringed baeckea, is a species of flowering plant in the family Myrtaceae and is endemic to eastern Australia. It is a shrub with lance-shaped leaves with the narrower end towards the base, and white flowers with seven to nine stamens.

== Description ==
Baeckea diosmifolia is a shrub that typically grows to a height of up to 60 cm (24 in). Its leaves are lance-shaped with the narrower end towards the base, 2.1–4.5 mm (0.083–0.177 in) long, 0.5–1.5 mm (0.020–0.059 in) wide on a petiole about 0.2 mm (0.0079 in) long. The flowers are up to 5.5 mm (0.22 in) wide and more or less sessile with linear to lance-shaped bracteoles 1.2–2.8 mm (0.047–0.110 in) long, but that fall off as the flower opens. The five sepals are 0.5–1.0 mm (0.020–0.039 in) long, the five petals are white, more or less round and 1.2–2.8 mm (0.047–0.110 in) long, there are seven to nine stamens and the style is about 1.0 mm (0.039 in) long. Flowering mainly occurs from December to May and the fruit is about 2 mm (0.079 in) in diameter.

== Taxonomy ==
Baeckea diosmifolia was first formally described in 1807 by Edward Rudge in Transactions of the Linnean Society of London. The specific epithet (diosmifolia) means "Diosma-leaved".

== Distribution and habitat ==
This baeckea grows in wet heathland along the coast and nearby tablelands of New South Wales as far south as the Budawang Range and as far inland as the Goulburn River. It is only known from a single population near Crows Nest in Queensland, although there are old records from Brisbane suburbs.
