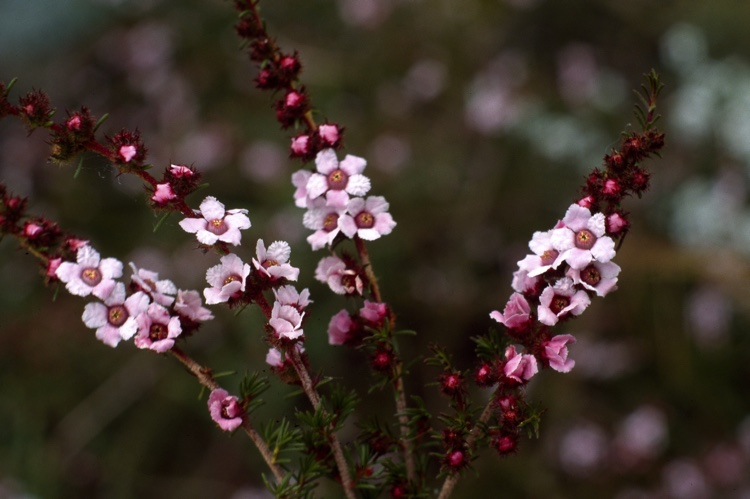
- In Adelaide

Scientific classification
- Kingdom: Plantae
- Clade: Tracheophytes
- Clade: Angiosperms
- Clade: Eudicots
- Clade: Rosids
- Order: Myrtales
- Family: Myrtaceae
- Genus: Baeckea
- Species: B. muricata

Binomial name
- Baeckea muricata C.A.Gardner

= Baeckea muricata =

Species of flowering plant

Baeckea muricata is a species of flowering plant in the family Myrtaceae and is endemic to the south-west of Western Australia. It is a spreading shrub typically grows to a height of 0.3 to 1 metre (1.0 to 3.3 ft) and a diameter of 1.5 metres (4.9 ft) and blooms between October and December producing white flowers. It is found on sand plains in central areas of the Wheatbelt region of Western Australia where it grows in sandy and gravelly clay soils.

Baeckea muricata was first formally described in 1928 by Charles Gardner in the Journal of the Royal Society of Western Australia from specimens he collected near Coolgardie in 1926. The specific epithet (muricata) means "rough with hard points".

== See also ==
- List of Baeckea species
