= Baeckea staminosa =

Conservation status
- Priority One — Poorly Known Taxa (DEC)

Scientific classification
- Kingdom: Plantae
- Clade: Tracheophytes
- Clade: Angiosperms
- Clade: Eudicots
- Clade: Rosids
- Order: Myrtales
- Family: Myrtaceae
- Genus: Baeckea
- Species: B. staminosa

Binomial name
- Baeckea staminosa E.Pritz.

Species of flowering plant

Baeckea staminosa is a species of flowering plant in the family Myrtaceae and is endemic to the south-west of Western Australia. It is a spreading shrub that typically grows to a height of 25 cm (9.8 in) and is found in wetlands in the Geraldton Sandplains biogeographic region.

The species was first formally described in 1904 by Ernst Georg Pritzel in Botanische Jahrbücher für Systematik, Pflanzengeschichte und Pflanzengeographie from specimens collected near the Greenough River. The specific epithet (staminosa) means "abounding in stamens".

Baeckea staminosa is classified as "Priority One" by the Government of Western Australia Department of Biodiversity, Conservation and Attractions, meaning that it is known from only one or a few locations which are potentially at risk.

== See also ==
- List of Baeckea species
