= Baeckea kandos =

Conservation status
- Endangered (EPBC Act)

Scientific classification
- Kingdom: Plantae
- Clade: Tracheophytes
- Clade: Angiosperms
- Clade: Eudicots
- Clade: Rosids
- Order: Myrtales
- Family: Myrtaceae
- Genus: Baeckea
- Species: B. kandos

Binomial name
- Baeckea kandos A.R.Bean

Species of flowering plant

Baeckea kandos is a species of flowering plant in the family Myrtaceae and is endemic to a restricted area of New South Wales. It is a spreading shrub with narrow egg-shaped to linear leaves and small white flowers with ten to twelve stamens.

== Description ==
Baeckea kandos is a spreading shrub that typically grows to a height of 1.5–2 m (4 ft 11 in – 6 ft 7 in) and has pink branchlets. The leaves are narrow oblong to linear, 4–6 mm (0.16–0.24 in) long and 0.5–1 mm (0.020–0.039 in) wide on a petiole up to 0.5 mm (0.020 in) long. The flowers are 3–4 mm (0.12–0.16 in) in diameter and are borne singly in leaf axils on a pedicel usually 1.0–1.5 mm (0.039–0.059 in) long with linear bracteoles about 1.5 mm (0.059 in) long at the base. The sepals are reddish and triangular to more or less round, 0.5–0.6 mm (0.020–0.024 in) long and the petals are white, more or less round and 1.5–1.9 mm (0.059–0.075 in) long. There are ten to twelve stamens in groups of up to three. The ovary has two locules and the style is about 0.5 mm (0.020 in) long. The fruit is a cylindrical capsule about 1.6 mm (0.063 in) long.

== Taxonomy ==
Baeckea kandos was first formally described in 1977 by Anthony Bean in the journal Telopea from specimens collected near Dunns Swamp in Wollemi National Park. The specific epithet (kandos) refers to the town of Kandos, near where the type specimens were collected.

== Distribution and habitat ==
Baeckea kandos grows in heathland or shrubland but is only known from two populations in Wollemi National Park, numbering about 100 plants.

== Conservation status ==
This baeckea is listed as "endangered" under the Australian Government Environment Protection and Biodiversity Conservation Act 1999 and the New South Wales Government Biodiversity Conservation Act 2016. The main threats to the species are activities associated with track maintenance, inappropriate fire regimes and its small population size.
