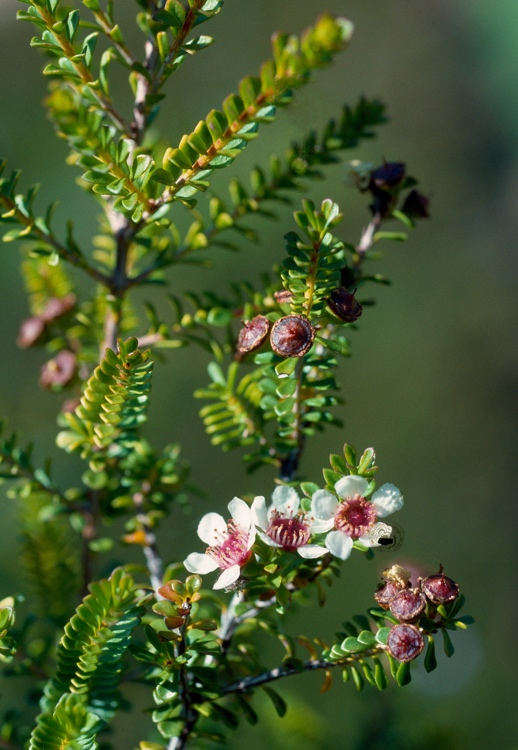
- In Kings Park, Perth

Conservation status
- Priority Two — Poorly Known Taxa (DEC)

Scientific classification
- Kingdom: Plantae
- Clade: Embryophytes
- Clade: Tracheophytes
- Clade: Spermatophytes
- Clade: Angiosperms
- Clade: Eudicots
- Clade: Rosids
- Order: Myrtales
- Family: Myrtaceae
- Genus: Baeckea
- Species: B. subcuneata

Binomial name
- Baeckea subcuneata F.Muell.

Synonyms
- Babingtonia subcuneata (F.Muell.) F.Muell.

= Baeckea subcuneata =

Species of flowering plant

Baeckea subcuneata is a species of flowering plant in the family Myrtaceae and is endemic to an area near the west coast of Western Australia. It is a shrub that typically grows to a height of 0.8 to 1.5 metres (2.6 to 4.9 ft) and blooms between August and November producing white-pink flowers. It is found on sand dunes and sandstone outcrops in the coastal parts of the Mid West region of Western Australia in a small area near Geraldton where it grows in sandy soils.

The species was first formally described by Ferdinand von Mueller in 1864 in his Fragmenta Phytographiae Australiae from specimens collected near the Murchison River by Augustus Oldfield. It is listed as 'Priority Two' by the Western Australian Government Department of Biodiversity, Conservation and Attractions, meaning that it is poorly known and from only one or a few locations.

== See also ==
- List of Baeckea species
