= Baeckea leptophylla =

Scientific classification
- Kingdom: Plantae
- Clade: Tracheophytes
- Clade: Angiosperms
- Clade: Eudicots
- Clade: Rosids
- Order: Myrtales
- Family: Myrtaceae
- Genus: Baeckea
- Species: B. leptophylla

Binomial name
- Baeckea leptophylla (Turcz.) Domin

Synonyms
- Harmogia leptophylla Turcz.

Species of flowering plant

Baeckea leptophylla is a species of flowering plant in the family Myrtaceae and is native to Western Australia.

The species was first formally described in 1852 by Nikolai Turczaninow who gave it the name Harmogia leptophylla in the Bulletin de la Classe Physico-Mathématique de l'Académie Impériale des Sciences de Saint-Pétersbourg from specimens collected by James Drummond. In 1923, Karel Domin changed the name to Baeckea leptophylla. The specific epithet (leptophylla) means "thin-leaved".

== See also ==
- List of Baeckea species
