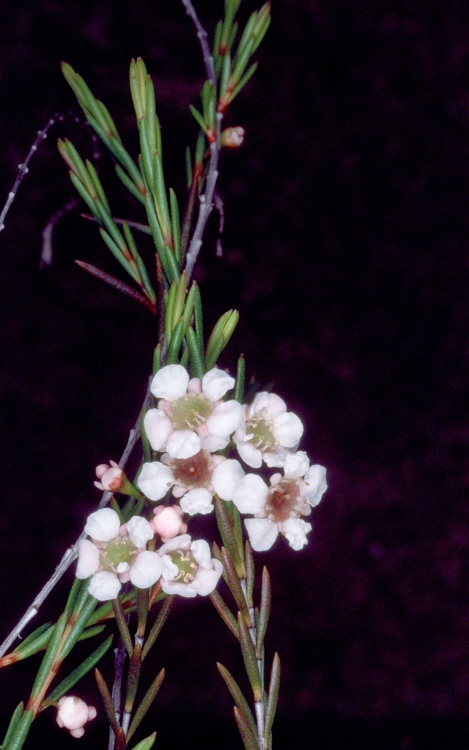
- In the Australian National Botanic Gardens

Scientific classification
- Kingdom: Plantae
- Clade: Tracheophytes
- Clade: Angiosperms
- Clade: Eudicots
- Clade: Rosids
- Order: Myrtales
- Family: Myrtaceae
- Genus: Baeckea
- Species: B. leptocaulis

Binomial name
- Baeckea leptocaulis Hook.f.

= Baeckea leptocaulis =

Species of flowering plant

Baeckea leptocaulis is a species of flowering plant in the family Myrtaceae and is endemic to Tasmania. It is a shrub with linear leaves and small white flowers with five or six stamens.

== Description ==
Baeckea leptocaulis is a shrub that typically grows to a height of 0.3–1 m (1 ft 0 in – 3 ft 3 in) and has grey or brown branchlets. The leaves are linear, mostly 4.5–10 mm (0.18–0.39 in) long and 0.8–1.2 mm (0.031–0.047 in) wide on a petiole 0.8–1.4 mm (0.031–0.055 in) long. The flowers are about 6 mm (0.24 in) in diameter and are borne in leaf axils on a peduncle about 0.5 mm (0.020 in) long, each flower on a pedicel 1.5–3.5 mm (0.059–0.138 in) long. The sepals are oblong, about 0.8 mm (0.031 in) long and the petals are white, more or less round and 1.6–2.2 mm (0.063–0.087 in) long. There are five or six stamens, the ovary has two locules and the style is about 1.0 mm (0.039 in) long. Flowering occurs between December and March and the fruit is a cylindrical to bell-shaped capsule 2.0–2.8 mm (0.079–0.110 in) long and wide.

== Taxonomy ==
Baeckea leptocaulis was first formally described in 1840 by Joseph Dalton Hooker in William Jackson Hooker's Icones Plantarum from specimens collected by Ronald Gunn at Rocky Cape. The specific epithet (leptocaulis) means "thin-stemmed".

== Distribution and habitat ==
This baeckea grows in wet heathland and sedgeland in western and central Tasmania.
