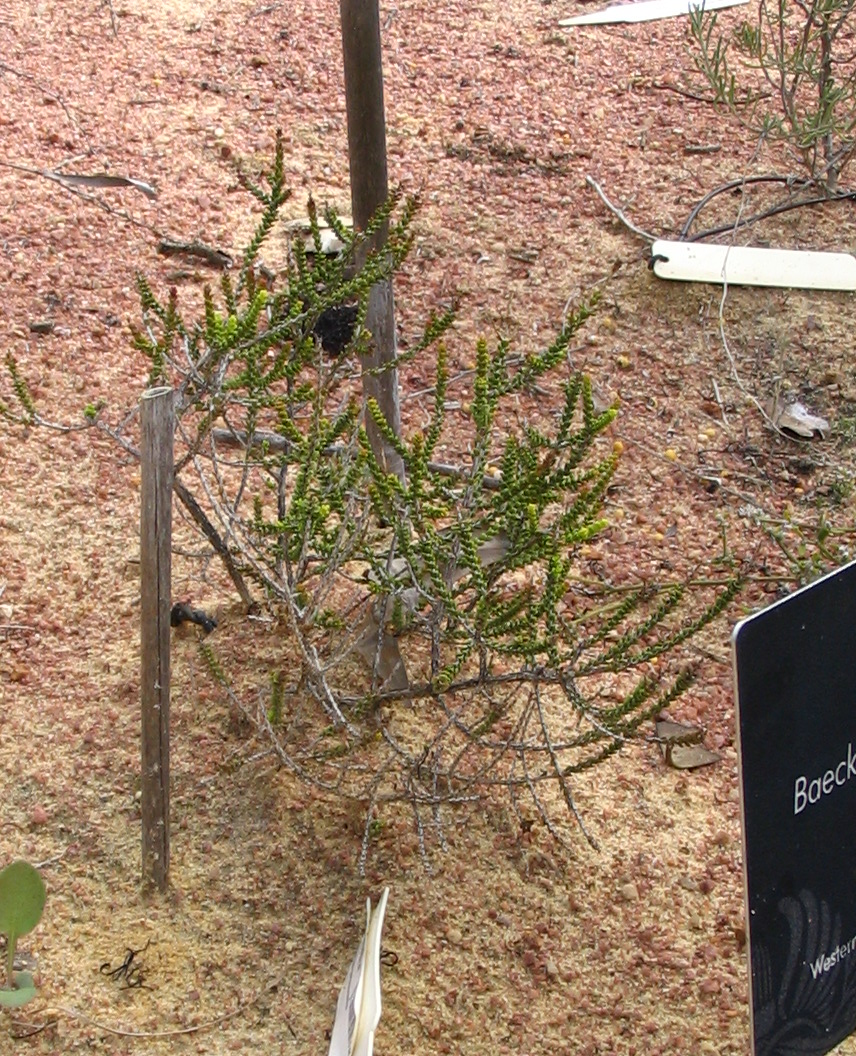
- In Kings Park

Scientific classification
- Kingdom: Plantae
- Clade: Tracheophytes
- Clade: Angiosperms
- Clade: Eudicots
- Clade: Rosids
- Order: Myrtales
- Family: Myrtaceae
- Genus: Baeckea
- Species: B. pentagonantha

Binomial name
- Baeckea pentagonantha F.Muell.

= Baeckea pentagonantha =

Species of flowering plant

Baeckea pentagonantha is a species of flowering plant in the family Myrtaceae and is endemic to near-coastal areas in the west of Western Australia. It is an erect, spreading shrub that typically grows to a height of 0.25 to 2 metres (0.8 to 6.6 ft) and blooms between July and October producing white flowers. It is found on sand plains and river flats in the coastal parts of the Mid West region of Western Australia centred around Geraldton where it grows in sandy soils.

Baeckea pentagonantha was first formally described by Ferdinand von Mueller in 1864 in his book Fragmenta Phytographiae Australiae from specimens collected by Augustus Oldfield near the Murchison River.

== See also ==
- List of Baeckea species
