= Limeburners Creek National Park =

National park in Australia

- IUCN category II (national park)
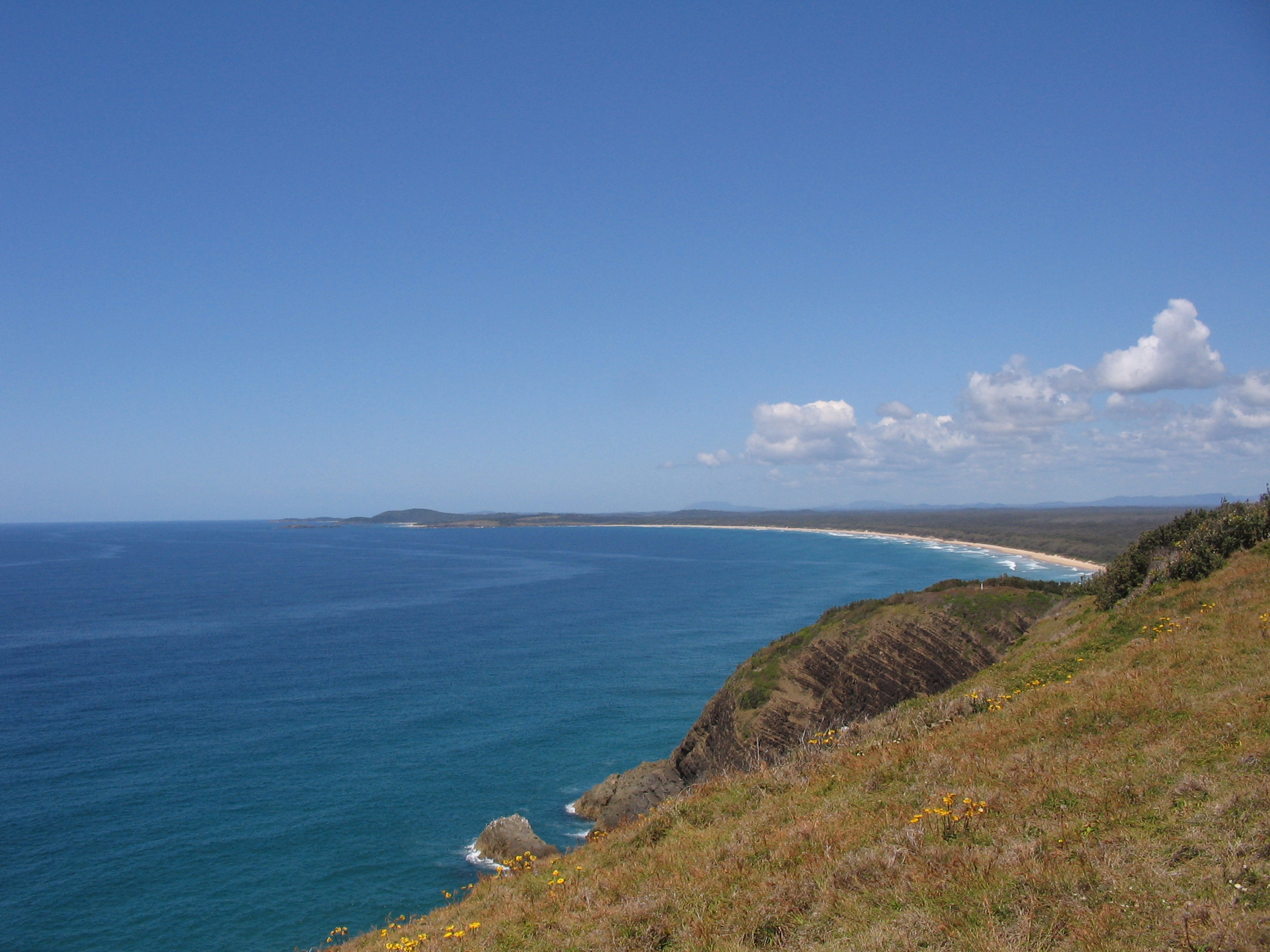
- View from Crescent Head, looking south towards the coastline in Limeburners Creek National Park

- Location within New South Wales
- Location: New South Wales
- Nearest city: Crescent Head
- Coordinates: 31°19′09″S 152°53′55″E
- Area: 9,123 ha (35.22 sq mi)
- Established: 2010
- Governing body: NSW National Parks & Wildlife Service
- Website: Official website

Limeburners Creek National Park is a protected national park on the Mid North Coast of New South Wales, Australia. The 91.2 km$^2$ (9123 ha) national park is located 5 km (3.1 mi) to the north of Port Macquarie and exists across both the Kempsey Shire and Port Macquarie-Hastings Council local government areas, but is chiefly managed by National Parks and Wildlife Service (New South Wales) (NPWS NSW). The area was originally erected as a nature reserve but this reservation was revoked when it became formally recognised as a national park in 2010 under the National Parks and Wildlife Act (1974). Many threatened ecological habitats and species of fauna and flora are found within this park, alongside several heritage sites of cultural significance, particularly to the local Birpai and Dunghutti people upon whose land the park exists. The protected status of this national park is largely owing to the ecological and cultural value of the area, in addition to the value of the ecosystems to further scientific research.

== Cultural heritage ==
Evidence of Indigenous occupation within Limeburners Creek National Park has been extrapolated through archaeological excavation of sites, revealing artefacts dating back 5000–6000 years ago. Such sites and artefacts evidencing the historical occupation of the Birpai and Dunghutti Aboriginal people include a stone quarry, grooves in sandstone used which were used to grind and sharpen tools, shell middens and burial sites. NPWS NSW are actively trying to preserve the integrity of these sites, particularly from vandalism due to improper use of 4WD tracks. The local Aboriginal people are thought to have sourced their food from the land and sea, with shellfish, mussels and pipis found plentifully throughout the park. Since 2006, NPWS NSW have been working in close partnership with local Aboriginal elders and Land Councils to plan and erect a Cultural Camp in the park, which is to be used for cultural and educational programs, as well as approved camping, in an aim to improve understandings of local Indigenous connections to the land.

== History ==
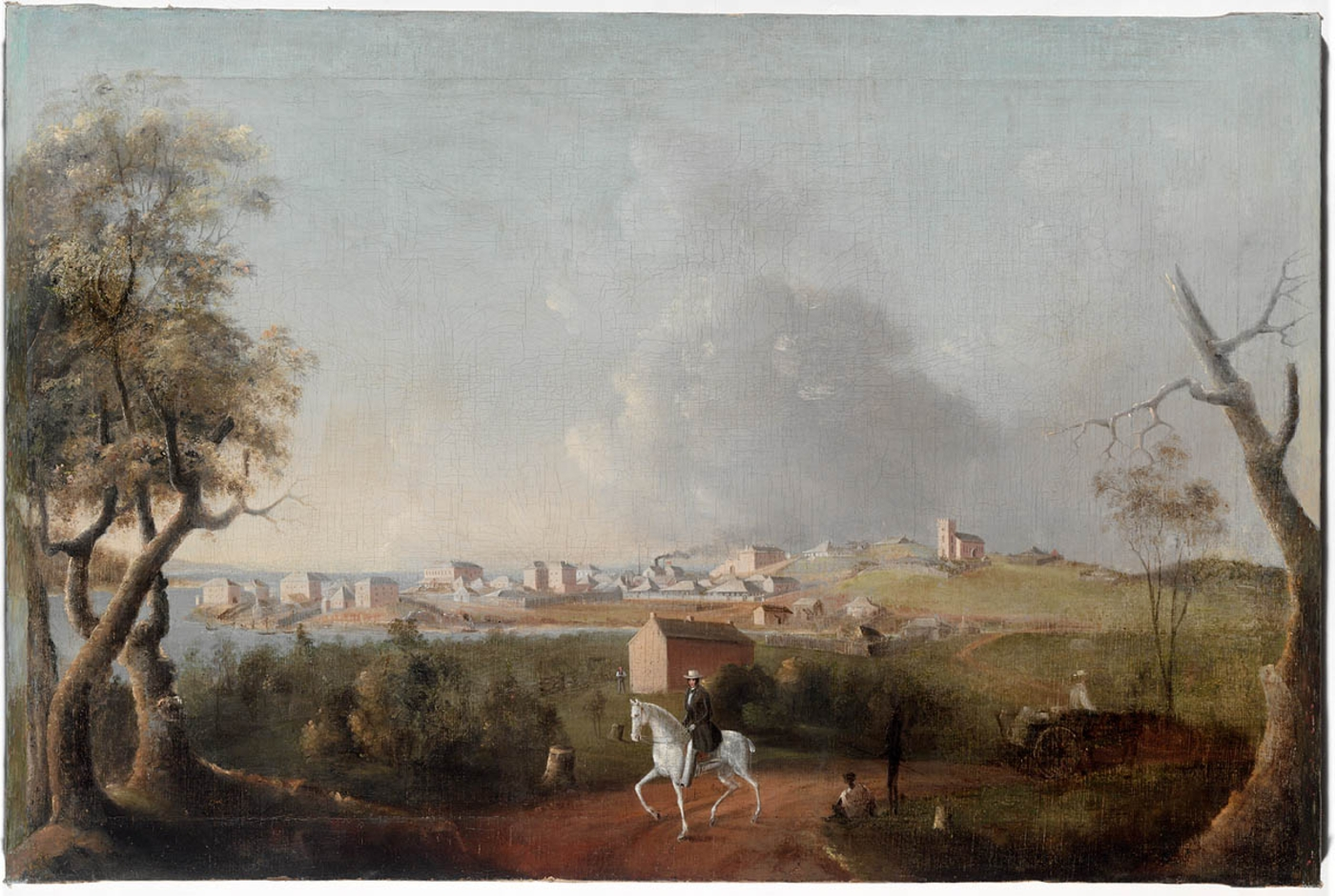
An artist's impression of the early penal settlement in Port Macquarie, just south of Limeburners Creek National Park

During the European settlement of Port Macquarie, the area which is now Limeburners Creek National Park was occupied for the production of lime. This lime was produced by burning large masses of oyster shells which were sourced throughout the park and was used in mortar to construct buildings in the settlement, affording the park its name. Following this, in 1881 this same land was declared part of the Orara Gold Field and for a short period of time, gold mining took place. During the 1960s, extensive sand mining took place along the NSW North Coast in an effort to extract minerals including zircon and rutile. Although a report excluded the area which became Limeburners Creek Nature Reserve from sand mining, such operations occurred just south of Point Plomer, in what is now Limeburners Creek National Park. In 1971, the area was declared a nature reserve covering approximately 6,879 hectares, however, this area was expanded in 2010 when it became formally recognised as a national park encompassing a total of 9,123 hectares

== Geology ==
Being situated on the coast, Limeburners Creek National Park consists predominantly of dunal and swampy land and sits for the most part, no more than 10 metres above sea level. Soils throughout the park consist mostly of sands, silts and clays which were deposited as alluvial sediment by the ancestral Hastings River as the river mouth drifted between Port Macquarie and Crescent Head. The highly sandy nature of these soils, particularly those close to the coast, renders them subject to rapid erosion, particularly in the event that surrounding vegetation is removed, exposing the soils to the elements. This is a key management concern for NPWS NSW who have to actively ensure that visitors only use the roads and trails provided.

8 wetlands have been identified in the park and these each receive relief mainly from the coastal dune systems but also from the headlands of Point Plomer, Big Hill and Queens Head, as well as a number of small inland hills. However, the park is ultimately drained by Limeburners Creek. Saltwater Lake, located in the centre of the park, is a major feature of the landscape. This lake system and the surrounding wetlands are exposed to tidal influences from the Hastings River, rendering them saline. However, following heavy rains, these wetlands rapidly become filled with mostly fresh water.

Headlands within Limeburners Creek National Park are known to belong to the Touchwood Formation which formed during the Devonian. Extending to the west, sand dunes and ridges belonging to the Quaternary become prevalent, with recent and ongoing sand deposition occurring along the coast on top of an underlying degraded barrier dating back to the Pleistocene.

== Climate ==
Limeburners Creek National Park uniformly experiences a subtropical climate. Typically, February is the wettest month, while August usually proves to be the driest.

Temperature data for Limeburners Creek National Park, source : NPWS NSW
	Maximum	Minimum
Average summer temperature (°C)	26	17
Average winter temperature (°C)	19	7
Highest/lowest recorded temperature (°C)	42.3	0

== Ecology ==
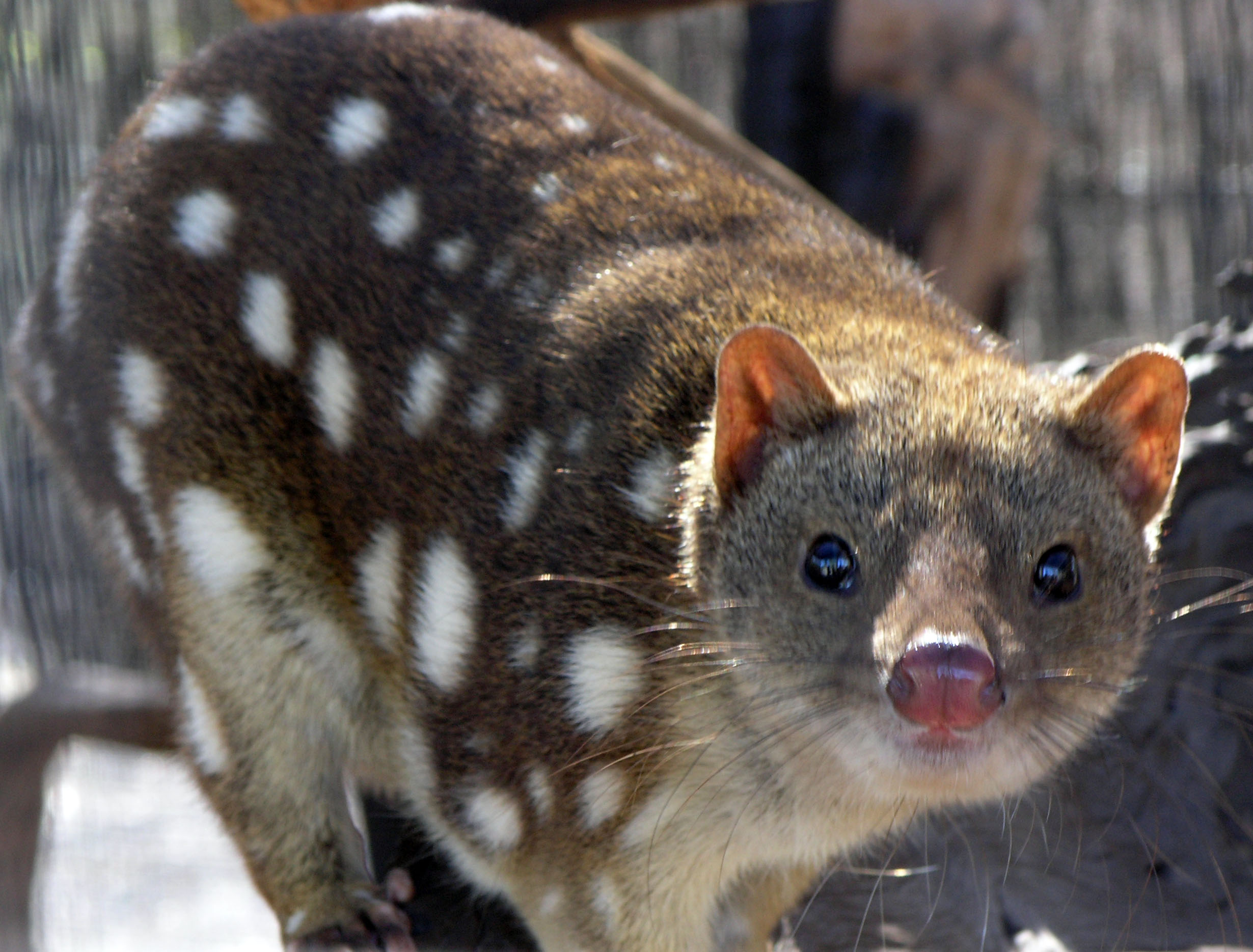
The spotted quoll (also known as the tiger quoll) is a small elusive carnivorous marsupial found which can be found in Limeburners Creek National Park

Limeburners Creek National Park is part of the North Coast Bioregion and sustains several ecological communities which, according to the Environment Protection and Biodiversity Act 1999, are considered to be critically endangered. These include communities of coastal saltmarsh, swamp oak floodplain forest and littoral rainforests. The park also hosts a diverse array of threatened fauna and flora including the rare ground parrot, spotted quoll and koala, in addition to broad-leaved tea trees, swamp oaks and bangalow palms.

These unique plant and animal species also face ecological competition in the park from several introduced and exotic species. Noxious exotic weeds such as bitou bush and lantana are prevalent within the park, responsible for outcompeting native flora and degrading the existing fragile and threatened native communities. Foxes, feral cats and feral dogs are problematic introduced animals which are found throughout the park. These species are known to predate on small mammal and bird species in particular, posing a serious threat to the viability of populations of native species in the park. Domestic cattle are also problematic and known to frequent the fringes of Limeburners Creek National Park after escaping adjacent properties. The biodiversity of Limeburners Creek National Park is also threatened by bushfires of increasing frequency and intensity.

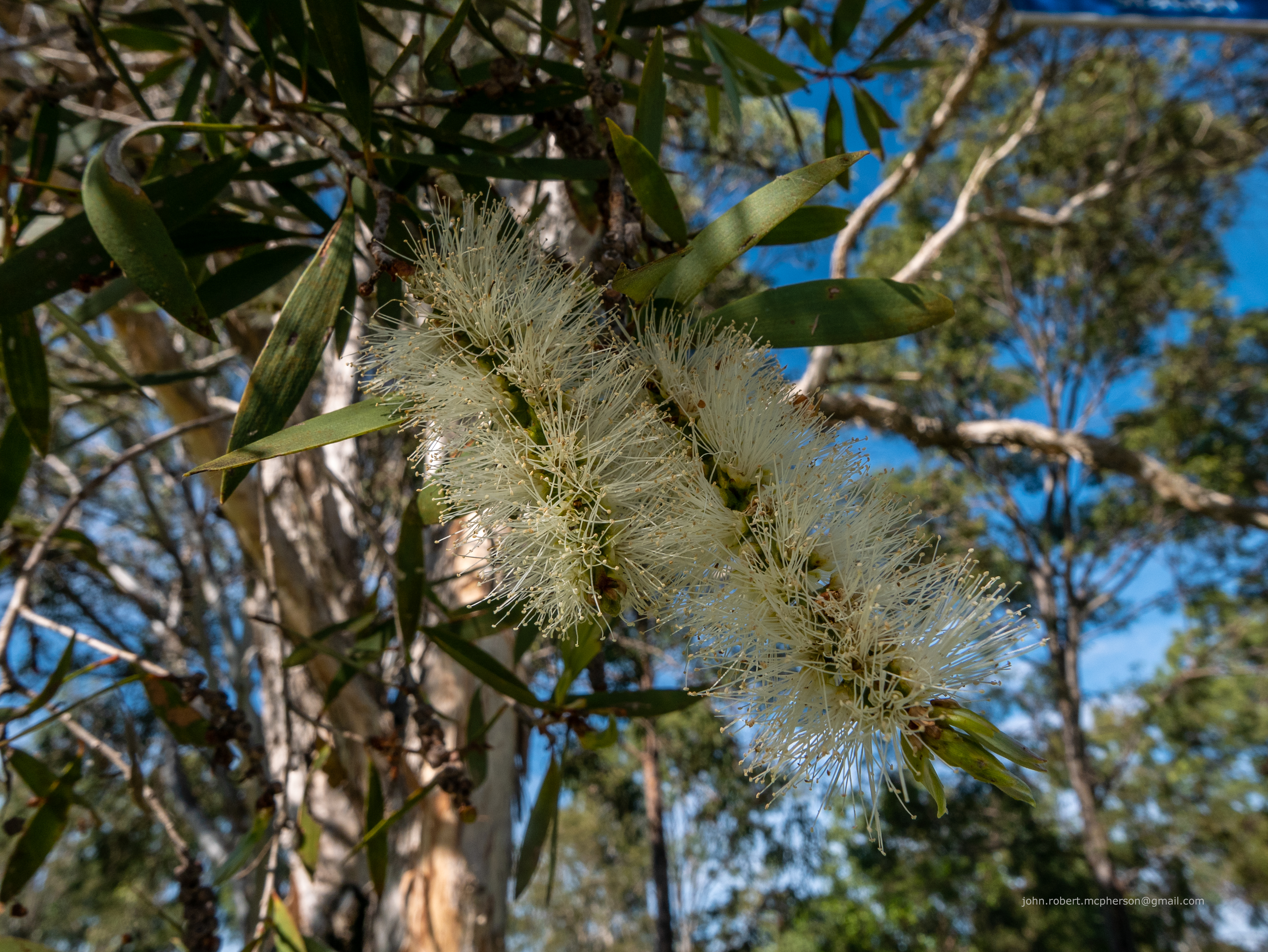
Flowers of the broad-leaved tea tree, which occurs throughout sclerophyll forests in Limeburners Creek National Park

=== Flora ===
Eucalyptus species are the dominant vegetation type found along the western fringe of Limeburners Creek National Park, being well-suited to the drier soils in this area. Dissimilarly, environments in the park's centre and east are mostly swamps, dominated by sclerophyll woodlands, wet heath and swamp shrublands. Another unique community within the park is that of the littoral rainforests which are found behind Queen's Head Beach as well as on the northern and southern slopes of Big Hill. Littoral rainforests have recently been listed as an endangered ecological community under section 1 of the Threatened Species Conservation Act 1995, which has rendered the asset a priority for conservation programs conducted by NPWS NSW.

The flora found within Limeburners Creek National Park is one of the key motives for its protection, given that 12 species have been identified as being at the limits of their geographical range or have been included in the Threatened Species Conservation Act (1995). Dominating floral species include heath banksia in the swampy shrublands, swamp oak and stands of broad-leaved tea tree in pockets of sclerophyll forests, with grass trees, fern-leaved banksia and tea tree the most prevalent plants in wet heath communities.

=== Fauna ===
Limeburners Creek National Park hosts an array of unique and endangered faunal species. The park has been identified as being one of only areas throughout coastal NSW where dingoes and quolls have not been displaced by human developments. Estuaries and islands in the park's southern region have also been identified as ecosystems that are critical in supporting populations of sea birds and water fowl. In addition, a bat colony of an undetermined species is known to reside in the limestone cave on Big Hill.

A number of reptile and frog species have been recorded in Limeburners Creek National Park. The lace monitor is one of the more common reptile species found within the park, often wandering in the bushland surrounding campgrounds where they frequently feed on scraps discarded or left behind by negligent campers. The park also supports several unique marsupial species, including the swamp wallaby, red-necked wallaby, feathertail glider and sugar glider, as well as an array of bird life, with species such as the pied oystercatcher and osprey having been recorded in the park's wetlands and dune environments.

The park also provides habitats for an assortment of endangered species, including the elusive eastern ground parrot, which shelters in forested wetlands and heathlands. Brush-tailed phascogales and koalas are among the threatened marsupials hosted by the park. Unique and vulnerable insects are too, known to reside in the park, such as the critically endangered laced fritillary, which reaches the southern limits of its geographical range in Limeburners Creek National Park, and the sword grass brown butterfly, which is found solely in the Port Macquarie area and reliant on the gahnia swamps in the park's west.

Given the diversity and vulnerability of ecological communities and their populations in Limeburners Creek National Park, it has been recommended that areas for scientific research be erected in and around saltwater lake, as well as the estuaries and islands in the park's south. These areas would facilitate environmental research and promote the undertaking of faunal and floral surveys to aid in population viability analysis.

=== Pest management ===
As a result of human introduction, exotic plants and animals have intruded Limeburners Creek National Park and many have since developed into feral populations. In accordance with the Noxious Weeds Act (1993), NPWS NSW have an ongoing obligation to control noxious weeds present within National Parks in NSW. In addition, NPWS NSW also control populations of introduced and feral animals in an effort to mitigate their impact on the existing native ecological communities.

Lantana and bitou bush are the most problematic weed species in Limeburners National Park, however, coastal morning glory and senna are also noxious weeds which are found and controlled in the park. Records indicate that lantana was introduced to the Port Macquarie area in 1838 and it has since spread and propagated itself, now found in almost every environment in Limeburners Creek National Park. Lantana is generally controlled with a combination of pesticide use and 'cut-and-spray' techniques, followed by hand removal and ongoing assessments. Bitou bush remains a very invasive and problematic species in dune environments and is of particular concern in those environments adjacent to littoral rainforest communities where bitou bush has the potential to cause further degradation through competition and displacement. Despite the persistent nature of bitou bush, it has been successfully removed from areas around Point Plomer and Queens Head using the Bradley method of bush regeneration.

Limeburners Creek National Park is fringed by several properties, many of which run domestic cattle that enter the park through poorly constructed fencing. Cattle are problematic as they erode and create new tracks by removing vegetation, and also contribute to the dispersal of weeds throughout the park. Wild dogs and foxes are a greater cause for concern in the park. This is because these feral animals threaten the vulnerable native populations of endemic fauna and pose a threat to public safety of visitors in the national park. These target species are managed by a combination of baiting and trapping operations which are overseen by NPWS NSW

=== Fire management ===
It is understood that Australian biota has adapted to moderately high wildfire frequency which has previously been governed by Indigenous land management practices and natural phenomena, however, NPWS NSW have also recognised that the frequency of wildfires has increased dramatically since European occupation of the land. The changing fire regime is largely attributed to the changing climate, however, the role of arson, with some of the more recent fires having been lit alongside Maria River Road and various tracks throughout the park. Although ecosystems within the national park all demand a level of protection from wildfires, they have differing fire regimes and so careful management by NPWS NSW is critical to ensuring that wildfires burn with particular intensities, frequencies and extents in these ecosystems. Fires occurring within Limeburners Creek National Park are largely controlled by NPWS NSW, sometimes in conjunction with the New South Wales Rural Fire Service, however, controlled burns are generally performed and managed chiefly by NPWS NSW, in accordance with their Fire Management Strategy.

== Facilities and activities ==
- Point Plomer campground
  - This campground is situated at the beach, in the northern part of Limeburners Creek National Park. The campground can host guests at 100 different individual campsites and is suitable for camping in tents, camping trailers or caravans. A shower and toilet block is located on the grounds, with picnic tables scattered throughout and a designated boat ramp installed.
- Melaleuca campground
  - This campground is located by the beach at Limeburners Creek National Park's northernmost point, adjacent to Big Hill. Capable of hosting visitors at 100 different individual sites, this campground is suitable for camping in tents, camping trailers and caravans. Melaleuca campground has limited facilities though, featuring only a small toilet block with no showers, and a gravel car park.
- Plomer Beach House
  - Plomer Beach House is capable of hosting up to 10 guests within 4 rooms, with barbecue facilities, toilets, showers and electricity available. This house is available to anyone visiting Limeburners Creek National Park, however, it requires prior booking.
- Big Hill Rainforest walking track
  - This walking track meanders through a section of heathland, littoral rainforest and headlands in Limeburners Creek National Park. The walking track stretches 1.4 km, beginning and looping back to Big Hill Picnic Area.

== See also ==
- Protected areas of New South Wales
- Crescent Head, New South Wales
- National Parks and Wildlife Service (New South Wales)
