= Scheuermann =

Scheuermann is a surname. Notable people with the surname include:

- Georg Caspar Scheuermann (Schürmann)
- Heidi Scheuermann, a Republican politician
- Holger Scheuermann (1877–1960), a Danish surgeon
  - Scheuermann's disease, named after Holger Scheuermann
  - See also Kyphosis

== See also ==
- Scheuermann Spur, a broad ice-covered limb of the Darwin Mountains
- Scheuerman
- Scheuer
