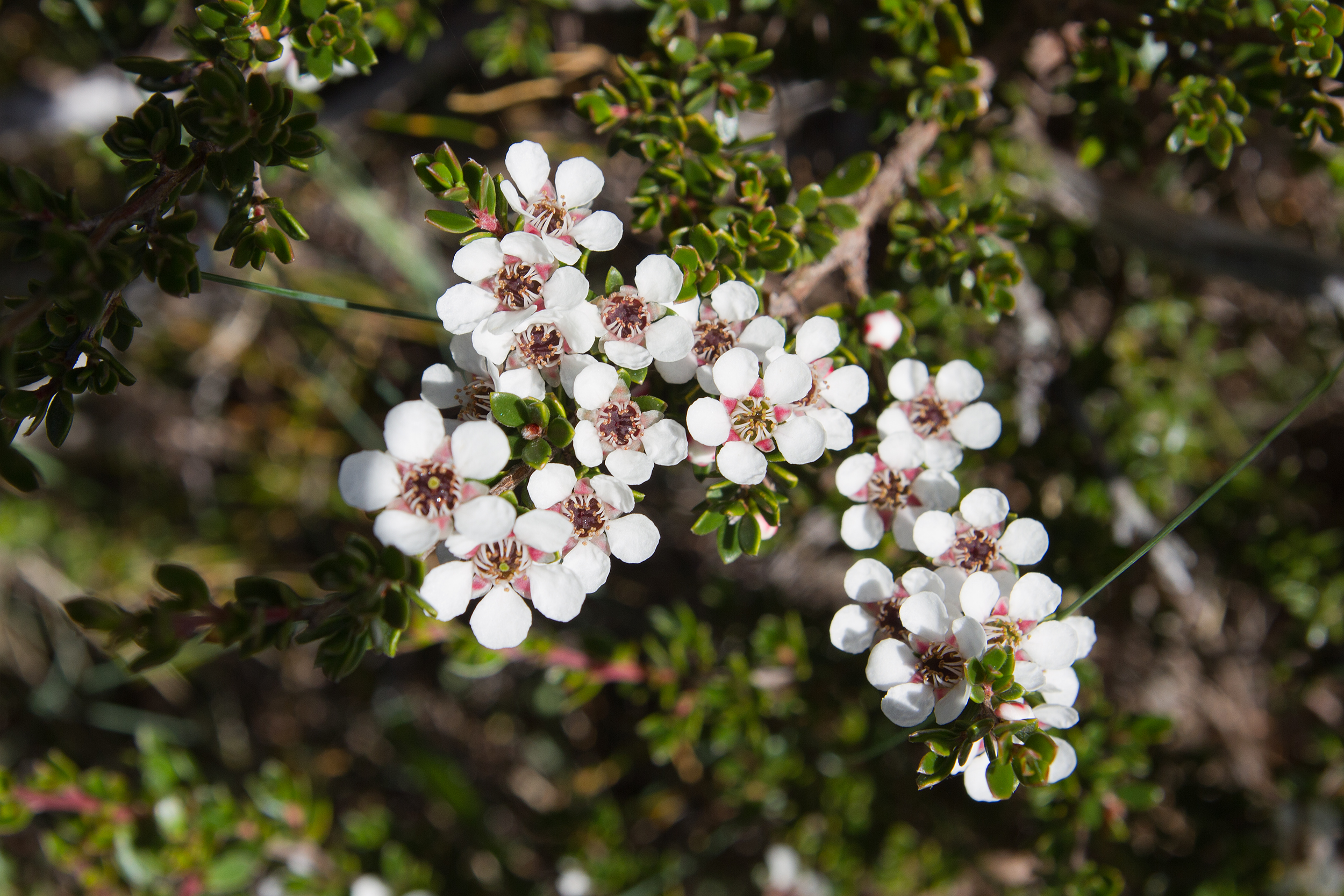
- Leptospermum rupestre, Walls of Jerusalem National Park

Scientific classification
- Kingdom: Plantae
- Clade: Tracheophytes
- Clade: Angiosperms
- Clade: Eudicots
- Clade: Rosids
- Order: Myrtales
- Family: Myrtaceae
- Genus: Leptospermum
- Species: L. rupestre

Binomial name
- Leptospermum rupestre Hook.f.
- Leptospermum rupestre is endemic to Tasmania

Synonyms
- Leptospermum grandifolium var. compactum Miq.; Leptospermum scoparium var. microphyllum S.Schauer

= Leptospermum rupestre =

Species of shrub

Leptospermum rupestre, commonly known as alpine tea-tree or prostrate tea-tree, is a flowering shrub in the myrtle family, Myrtaceae. It is endemic to Tasmania. In alpine areas it assumes a prostrate habit while in subalpine areas it appears as a large shrub.

== Description ==
Leptospermum rupestre is a common alpine and subalpine shrub in Tasmania. The growth habit varies, at higher exposed altitudes it is a prostrate plant up to 1 m (3 ft 3 in) high. At lower altitudes it can become a large shrub to 4 m (13 ft) high. It has small, blunt, shiny dark green, oval to elliptic shaped leaves, 2–9 mm (0.079–0.354 in) long. The white flowers are small 1 cm (0.39 in) wide, 5 petalled, with an open habit and flower in profusion in leaf axils during summer. The reddish branches become mat-forming over rocks. The small seed capsules are about 5 mm (0.20 in) in diameter.

== Taxonomy and naming ==
Leptospermum rupestre was first formally described in 1840 by botanist Joseph Dalton Hooker and the description was published in Icones Plantarum. Robert Brown observed it growing on rocky outcrops on Mount Wellington and nearby mountains. The word rupestre is derived from the Latin word rupestris, meaning rocky, referring to the habitat where it was found.

== Distribution and habitat ==
This species is endemic to Tasmania, found growing in a sunny situation on light to medium soils.

== Cultivation ==
It is one of the hardiest species of its genus and is suitable for cultivation outdoors.
