= Schauer =

Schauer is a German surname. Notable people with the surname include:

- Amy Schauer (1871–1956), Australian cookery instructor and author
- Anton G. Schauer (1860–1932), American politician
- Austen Schauer, member of North Dakota House of Representatives
- David A. Schauer, the current executive director of the National Council on Radiation Protection and Measurements
- Frederick Schauer (born 1946), American legal scholar
- Henry Schauer (1918–1997), a United States Army soldier
- Hilbert Schauer (1920–2015), associate justice of the Colorado Supreme Court
- Johannes Conrad Schauer (1813–1848), a botanist interested in Spermatophytes
- Jonathan Schauer (born 2005), German diver
- Maria Schauer, Austrian, Righteous Among the Nations
- Mark Schauer (born 1961), an American Congressman from Michigan
- Mitch Schauer (born 1955), a television professional
- Rube Schauer (1891–1957), a Major League Baseball player
- Stefan Schauer (born 1983), German ice hockey player

== See also ==
- Joseph Schauers (1909–1987), an American rower
- Schauer Lake, a lake in Sibley County, Minnesota
- an actor in the 1920 French silent film Face à l'Océan
- Schauer-Romantik
- Pat Schauer Rookie of the Year
- Schauren
- Scheuer, Scheuermann
