= List of Euryglossina species =

This is a list of species in the bee genus Euryglossina:

== Species ==
- Euryglossina angulifacies Exley, 1968
- Euryglossina argocephala Exley, 1968
- Euryglossina atomaria (Cockerell, 1914)
- Euryglossina atra Exley, 1968
- Euryglossina aurantia Exley, 1969
- Euryglossina bowenensis Exley, 1968
- Euryglossina cardaleae (Exley, 1968)
- Euryglossina clypearis Exley, 1976
- Euryglossina clypearis (Exley, 1980)
- Euryglossina cockerelli Perkins, 1912
- Euryglossina cornuta (Cockerell, 1929)
- Euryglossina crococephala Exley, 1968
- Euryglossina darwiniensis (Exley, 1974)
- Euryglossina doddi (Exley, 1968)
- Euryglossina doddi (Perkins, 1912)
- Euryglossina douglasi Exley, 1968
- Euryglossina flaviventris Cockerell, 1916
- Euryglossina flavolateralis Michener, 1965
- Euryglossina fuscescens Cockerell, 1929
- Euryglossina gigantica (Exley, 1974)
- Euryglossina gigantocephala Exley, 1968
- Euryglossina gilberti (Cockerell, 1910)
- Euryglossina glauerti (Rayment, 1934)
- Euryglossina glenmorganensis Exley, 1968
- Euryglossina globuliceps (Cockerell, 1918)
- Euryglossina gracilis Exley, 1968
- Euryglossina grandigena Exley, 1968
- Euryglossina haemodonta Exley, 1969
- Euryglossina healesvillensis Exley, 1968
- Euryglossina hypochroma Cockerell, 1916
- Euryglossina incompleta (Exley, 1974)
- Euryglossina intermedia Michener, 1965
- Euryglossina kellyi Exley, 1968
- Euryglossina leucognatha (Exley, 1974)
- Euryglossina leyburnensis Exley, 1983
- Euryglossina lobiocula Exley, 1968
- Euryglossina lynettae (Rayment, 1955)
- Euryglossina macrostoma (Cockerell, 1929)
- Euryglossina megalocephala Exley, 1968
- Euryglossina melanocephala Exley, 1968
- Euryglossina melanognatha (Exley, 1980)
- Euryglossina mellea (Cockerell, 1929)
- Euryglossina micheneri Exley, 1968
- Euryglossina minima (Cockerell, 1910)
- Euryglossina moonbiensis (Exley, 1968)
- Euryglossina mutica (Cockerell, 1912)
- Euryglossina narifera (Cockerell, 1915)
- Euryglossina neominima (Exley, 1974)
- Euryglossina nigra Exley, 1968
- Euryglossina nothula (Cockerell, 1922)
- Euryglossina oenpelli (Exley, 1982)
- Euryglossina perkinsi Michener, 1965
- Euryglossina perpusilla (Cockerell, 1910)
- Euryglossina philoxantha Cockerell, 1929
- Euryglossina polita Exley, 1968
- Euryglossina proctotrypoides Cockerell, 1913
- Euryglossina proserpinensis Exley, 1968
- Euryglossina pseudoatomaria Exley, 1968
- Euryglossina psilosoma Exley, 1968
- Euryglossina pulcherrima Exley, 1968
- Euryglossina pulchra Exley, 1968
- Euryglossina scapata (Exley, 1980)
- Euryglossina semipurpurea (Cockerell, 1910)
- Euryglossina storeyi Exley, 1976
- Euryglossina stygica Exley, 1968
- Euryglossina subnothula (Cockerell, 1929)
- Euryglossina sulcata Exley, 1968
- Euryglossina townsvillensis Exley, 1968
- Euryglossina tuberculata (Exley, 1980)
- Euryglossina walkeri (Exley, 1980)
- Euryglossina weiri (Exley, 1974)
- Euryglossina xanthocephala Exley, 1968
- Euryglossina xanthogena (Rayment, 1935)
