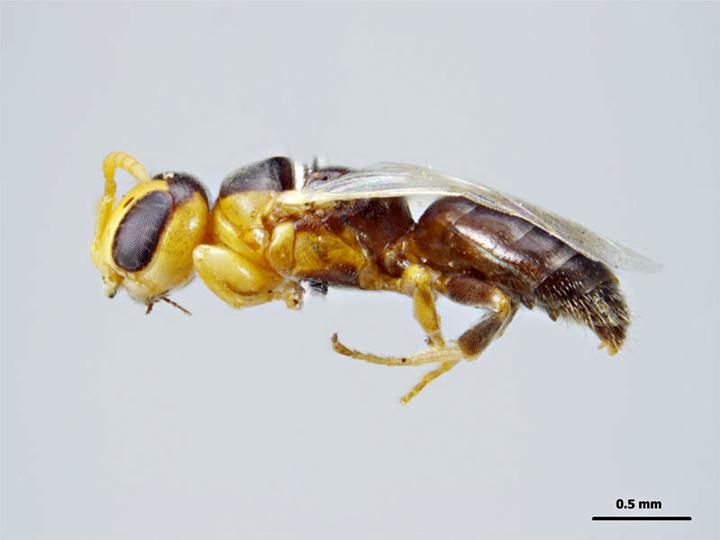
- Male

Scientific classification
- Kingdom: Animalia
- Phylum: Arthropoda
- Clade: Pancrustacea
- Class: Insecta
- Order: Hymenoptera
- Family: Colletidae
- Genus: Euryglossina
- Species: E. tuberculata

Binomial name
- Euryglossina tuberculata (Exley, 1980)

Synonyms
- Quasihesma tuberculata Exley, 1980

= Euryglossina tuberculata =

Species of bee

Euryglossina tuberculata, or Euryglossina (Quasihesma) tuberculata, is a species of bee in the family Colletidae and the subfamily Euryglossinae. It is endemic to Australia. It was described in 1980 by Australian entomologist Elizabeth Exley.

== Etymology ==
The specific epithet tuberculata refers to the tubercles on the venters of the males.

== Description ==
Female body length is 2.1 mm, wing length 1.4 mm; male body length is 2.1 mm, wing length 1.4 mm. The colour is mainly black, yellow and brown.

== Distribution and habitat ==
The species occurs on the Cape York Peninsula of Far North Queensland. The type locality is 27 km north of Coen.

== Behaviour ==
The adults are flying mellivores.
