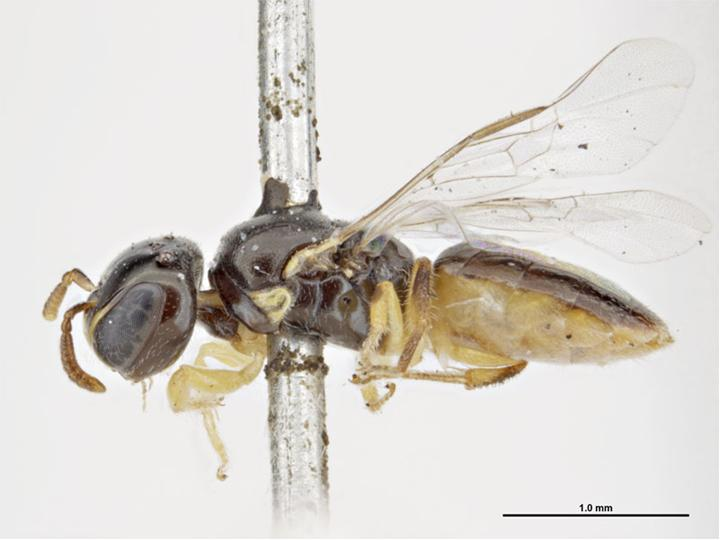
- Female

Scientific classification
- Kingdom: Animalia
- Phylum: Arthropoda
- Clade: Pancrustacea
- Class: Insecta
- Order: Hymenoptera
- Family: Colletidae
- Genus: Euryglossina
- Species: E. lynettae

Binomial name
- Euryglossina lynettae (Rayment, 1955)

Synonyms
- Pachyprosopis lynettae Rayment, 1955

= Euryglossina lynettae =

Species of bee

Euryglossina lynettae, or Euryglossina (Euryglossina) lynettae, is a species of bee in the family Colletidae and the subfamily Euryglossinae. It is endemic to Australia. It was described in 1955 by Australian entomologist Tarlton Rayment.

== Etymology ==
The specific epithet lynettae honours Rayment's friend Lynette Young "in appreciation of her co-operation over the years".

== Description ==
Body length is 3 mm. Colouring is black and yellow.

== Distribution and habitat ==
The species occurs across southern Australia. The type locality is Toorak in Melbourne, Victoria.

== Behaviour ==
The adults are solitary flying mellivores that nest in timber in abandoned beetle galleries. Flowering plants visited by the bees include Eucalyptus species.
