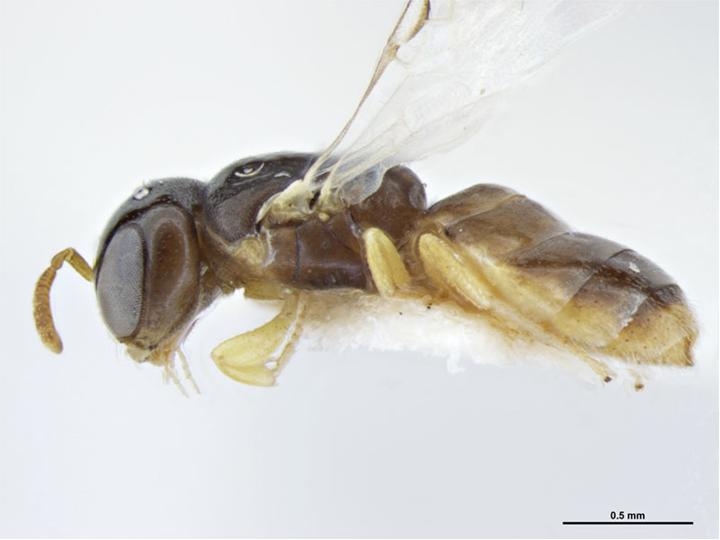
- Female

Scientific classification
- Kingdom: Animalia
- Phylum: Arthropoda
- Clade: Pancrustacea
- Class: Insecta
- Order: Hymenoptera
- Family: Colletidae
- Genus: Euryglossina
- Species: E. incompleta

Binomial name
- Euryglossina incompleta (Exley, 1974)

Synonyms
- Euryglossella incompleta Exley, 1974

= Euryglossina incompleta =

Species of bee

Euryglossina incompleta, or Euryglossina (Euryglossella) incompleta, is a species of bee in the family Colletidae and the subfamily Euryglossinae. It is endemic to Australia. It was described in 1974 by Australian entomologist Elizabeth Exley.

== Etymology ==
The species epithet incompleta is an anatomical reference to the lack of a cell in the forewing.

== Description ==
Male body length is 2.1 mm, wing length 1.4 mm. Colouration is mainly black, dark brown and yellow.

== Distribution and habitat ==
The species occurs in northern Australia. The type locality is Mount Bundey Road, via Darwin, Northern Territory. It has also been recorded from Queensland.

== Behaviour ==
The adults are flying mellivores. Flowering plants visited by the bees include Eucalyptus tectifica and Eugenia species.

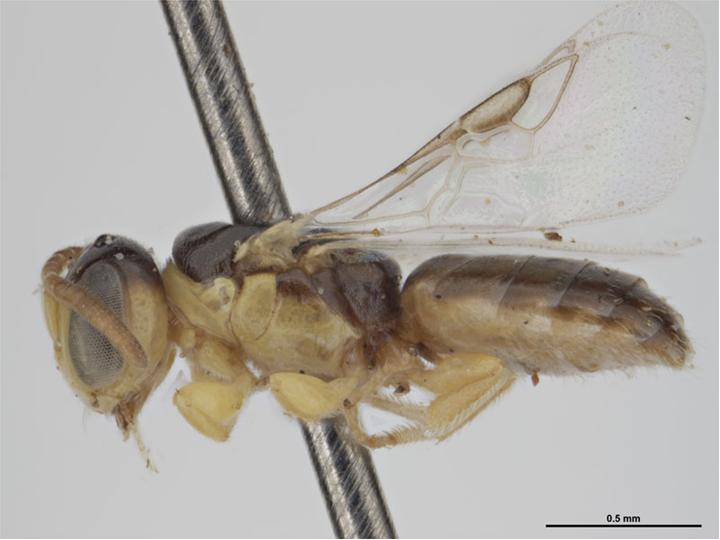
Male
