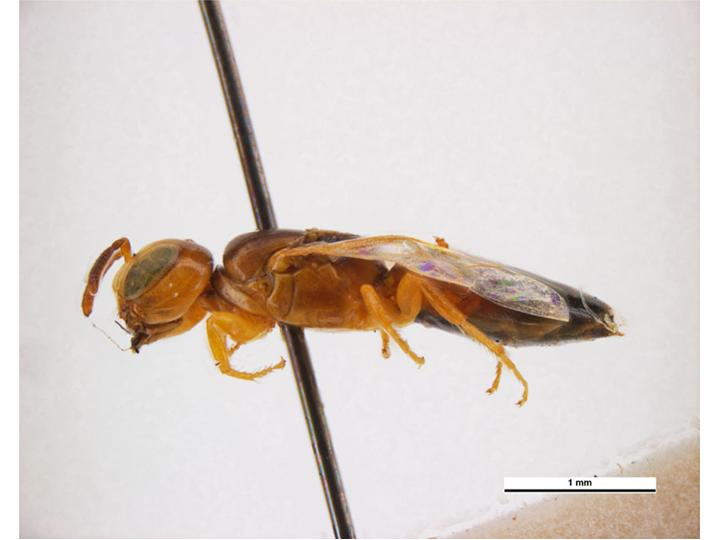
- Female

Scientific classification
- Kingdom: Animalia
- Phylum: Arthropoda
- Clade: Pancrustacea
- Class: Insecta
- Order: Hymenoptera
- Family: Colletidae
- Genus: Euryglossina
- Species: E. mellea

Binomial name
- Euryglossina mellea (Cockerell, 1929)

Synonyms
- Microdontura mellea Cockerell, 1929

= Euryglossina mellea =

Species of bee

Euryglossina mellea, or Euryglossina (Microdontura) mellea, is a species of bee in the family Colletidae and the subfamily Euryglossinae. It is endemic to Australia. It was described in 1929 by British-American entomologist Theodore Dru Alison Cockerell.

== Description ==
The body length of females is about 3.5 mm. The head, thorax and abdomen are dorsally light reddish-brown, the metathorax black, paler beneath.

== Distribution and habitat ==
The species occurs in eastern Australia. The type locality is Brisbane in south-east Queensland. It is also recorded from New South Wales, Victoria. Its status in Western Australia is uncertain; it may have been introduced from the east.

== Behaviour ==
The adults are flying mellivores. Flowering plants visited by the bees include Angophora, Callistemon, Eucalyptus, Eugenia, Melaleuca, Leptospermum, Syncarpia and Tristania species.

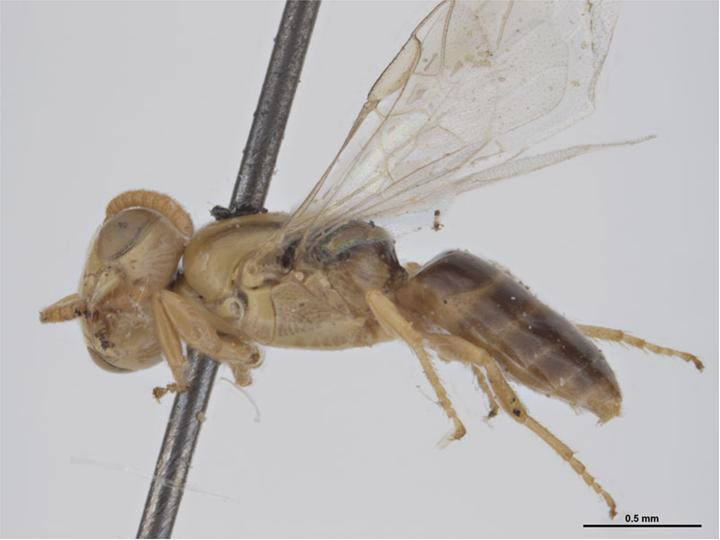
Male
