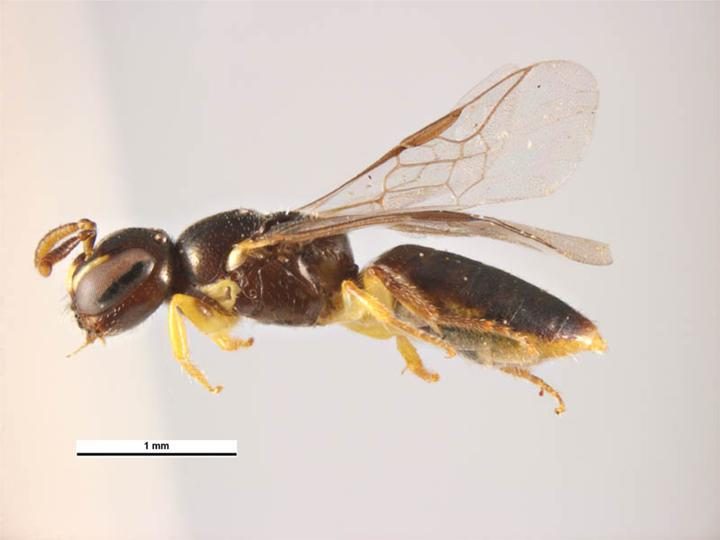
- Female

Scientific classification
- Kingdom: Animalia
- Phylum: Arthropoda
- Clade: Pancrustacea
- Class: Insecta
- Order: Hymenoptera
- Family: Colletidae
- Genus: Euryglossina
- Species: E. fuscescens

Binomial name
- Euryglossina fuscescens Cockerell, 1929

Synonyms
- Euryglossina flaviventris fuscescens Cockerell, 1929

= Euryglossina fuscescens =

Species of bee

Euryglossina fuscescens, or Euryglossina (Euryglossina) fuscescens, is a species of bee in the family Colletidae and the subfamily Euryglossinae. It is endemic to Australia. It was described in 1929 by British-American entomologist Theodore Dru Alison Cockerell.

== Distribution and habitat ==
The species occurs in eastern Australia. The type locality is Brisbane.

== Behaviour ==
The adults are flying mellivores. Flowering plants visited by the bees include Eucalyptus, Angophora, Callistemon, Melaleuca, Syncarpia and Tristania species.

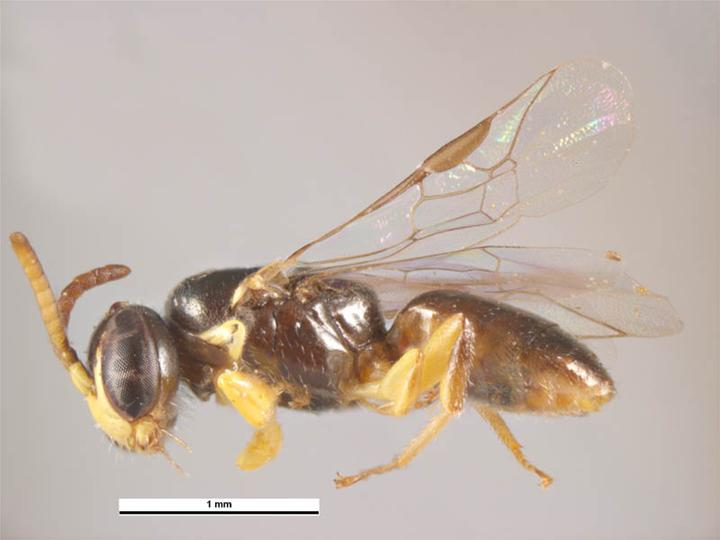
Male
