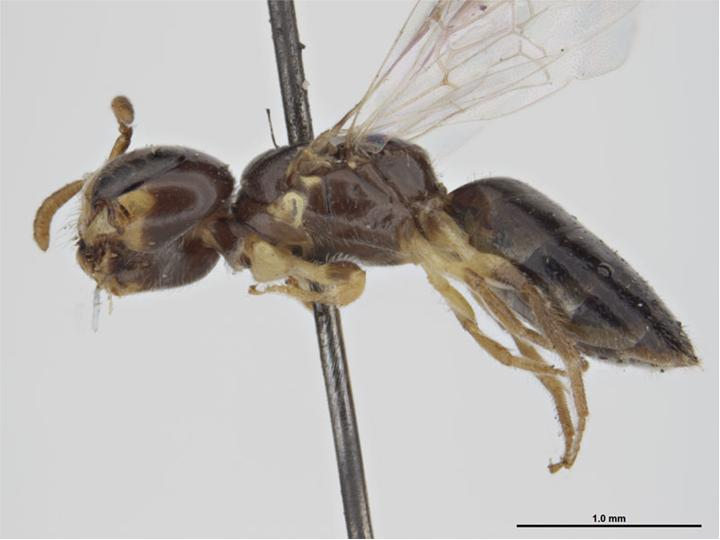
- Female

Scientific classification
- Kingdom: Animalia
- Phylum: Arthropoda
- Clade: Pancrustacea
- Class: Insecta
- Order: Hymenoptera
- Family: Colletidae
- Genus: Euryglossina
- Species: E. macrostoma

Binomial name
- Euryglossina macrostoma (Cockerell, 1929)

Synonyms
- Turnerella macrostoma Cockerell, 1929

= Euryglossina macrostoma =

Species of bee

Euryglossina macrostoma, or Euryglossina (Euryglossina) macrostoma, is a species of bee in the family Colletidae and the subfamily Euryglossinae. It is endemic to Australia. It was described in 1929 by British-American entomologist Theodore Dru Alison Cockerell.

== Distribution and habitat ==
The species occurs in eastern Australia. The type locality is Brisbane in south-east Queensland. Other published localities include Capalaba and Mount Pleasant, as well as Ku-ring-gai Chase National Park in New South Wales.

== Behaviour ==
The adults are flying mellivores. Flowering plants visited by the bees include Leptospermum and Melaleuca species.
