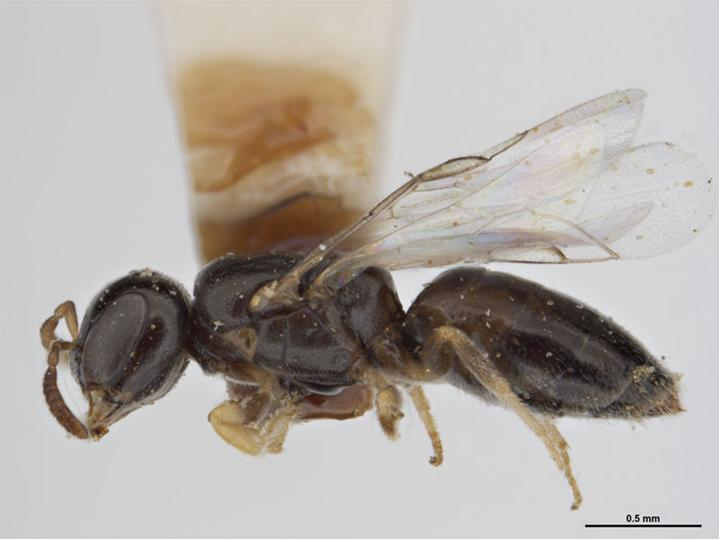
- Female

Scientific classification
- Kingdom: Animalia
- Phylum: Arthropoda
- Clade: Pancrustacea
- Class: Insecta
- Order: Hymenoptera
- Family: Colletidae
- Genus: Euryglossina
- Species: E. minima

Binomial name
- Euryglossina minima (Cockerell, 1910)

Synonyms
- Euryglossella minima Cockerell, 1910

= Euryglossina minima =

Species of bee

Euryglossina minima, or Euryglossina (Euryglossella) minima, is a species of bee in the family Colletidae and the subfamily Euryglossinae. It is endemic to Australia. It was described in 1910 by British-American entomologist Theodore Dru Alison Cockerell.

== Distribution and habitat ==
The species occurs in north-eastern Queensland. The type locality is Mackay. It has also been recorded from Townsville, Shute Harbour and near Kuranda.

== Behaviour ==
The adults are flying mellivores. Flowering plants visited by the bees include Eucalyptus species.
