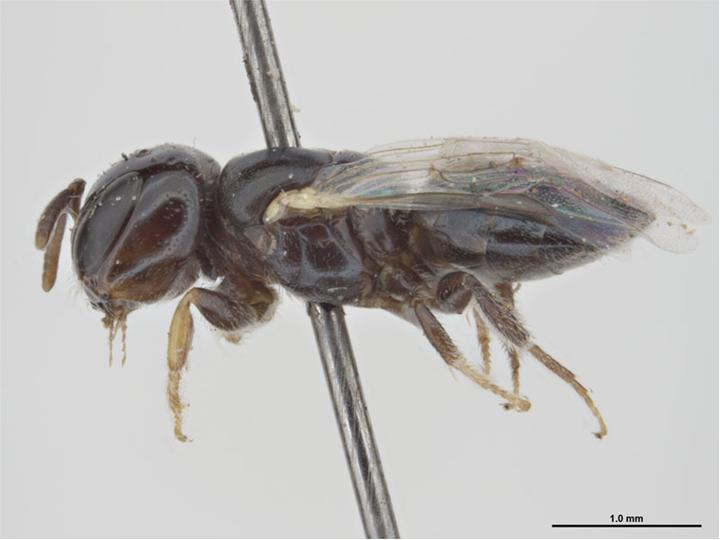
- Female

Scientific classification
- Kingdom: Animalia
- Phylum: Arthropoda
- Clade: Pancrustacea
- Class: Insecta
- Order: Hymenoptera
- Family: Colletidae
- Genus: Euryglossina
- Species: E. storeyi

Binomial name
- Euryglossina storeyi Exley, 1976

= Euryglossina storeyi =

Species of bee

Euryglossina storeyi, or Euryglossina (Euryglossina) storeyi, is a species of bee in the family Colletidae and the subfamily Euryglossinae. It is endemic to Australia. It was described in 1976 by Australian entomologist Elizabeth Exley.

== Etymology ==
The specific epithet storeyi honours R. I. Storey who collected many specimens of this species.

== Description ==
Female body length is 3.0–3.8 mm, wing length 2.3 mm; male body length is 2.7–3.6 mm, wing length 2.2 mm. Colour of female upper body and thorax is iridescent blue, black beneath. Male colouring is mainly black, yellowish and dark brown.

== Distribution and habitat ==
The species occurs in northern Australia. The type locality is Broome, Western Australia.

== Behaviour ==
The adults are flying mellivores. Flowering plants visited by the bees include Eucalyptus species.

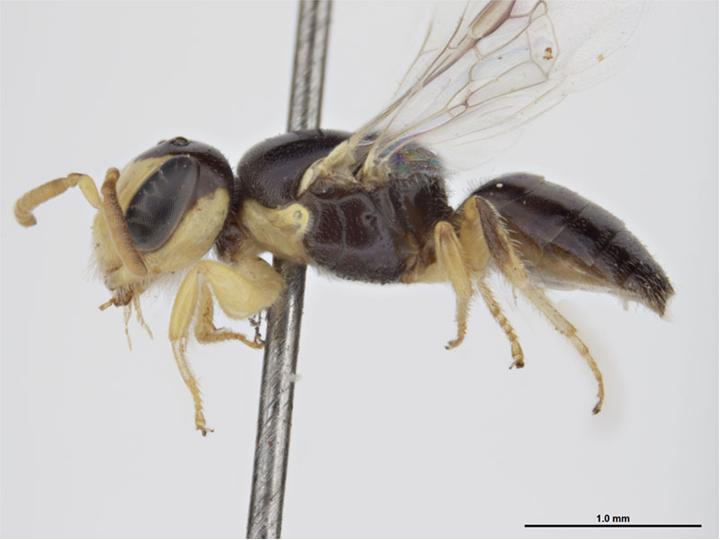
Male
