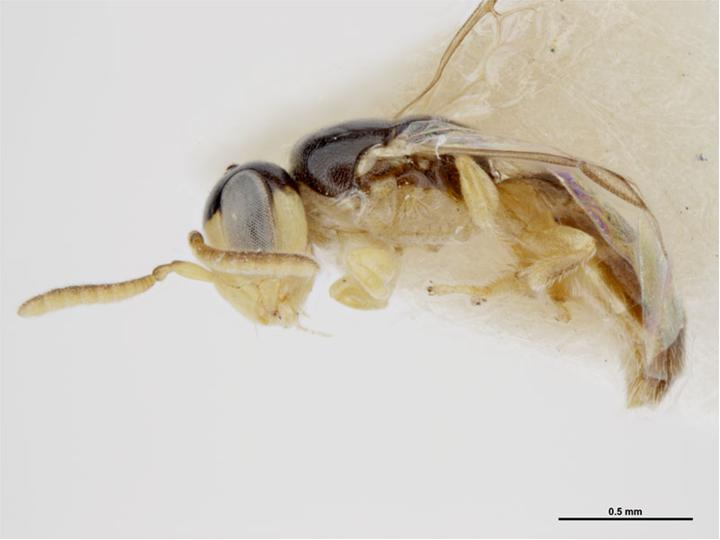
- Female

Scientific classification
- Kingdom: Animalia
- Phylum: Arthropoda
- Clade: Pancrustacea
- Class: Insecta
- Order: Hymenoptera
- Family: Colletidae
- Genus: Euryglossina
- Species: E. weiri

Binomial name
- Euryglossina weiri (Exley, 1974)

Synonyms
- Euryglossella weiri Exley, 1974

= Euryglossina weiri =

Species of bee

Euryglossina weiri, or Euryglossina (Euryglossella) weiri, is a species of bee in the family Colletidae and the subfamily Euryglossinae. It is endemic to Australia. It was described in 1974 by Australian entomologist Elizabeth Exley.

== Etymology ==
The specific epithet weiri honours Tom Weir who collected many of the specimens described in Exley's 1974 paper.

== Description ==
Male body length is 2.3 mm, wing length 1.5 mm. Colouration is mainly black, dark brown and yellow.

== Distribution and habitat ==
The species occurs in northern Australia. The type locality is Coconut Grove via Darwin, Northern Territory.

== Behaviour ==
The adults are flying mellivores. Flowering plants visited by the bees include Eucalyptus papuana, Tristania, Melaleuca and Eugenia species.
