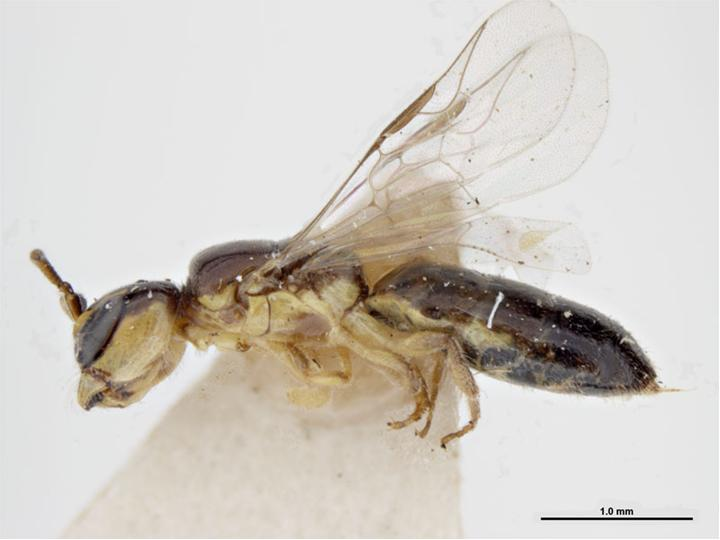
- Female

Scientific classification
- Kingdom: Animalia
- Phylum: Arthropoda
- Clade: Pancrustacea
- Class: Insecta
- Order: Hymenoptera
- Family: Colletidae
- Genus: Euryglossina
- Species: E. angulifacies

Binomial name
- Euryglossina angulifacies Exley, 1968

Synonyms
- Euryglossina (Turnerella) angulifacies Exley, 1968

= Euryglossina angulifacies =

Species of bee

Euryglossina angulifacies, or Euryglossina (Euryglossina) angulifacies, is a species of bee in the family Colletidae and the subfamily Euryglossinae. It is endemic to Australia. It was described in 1968 by Australian entomologist Elizabeth Exley.

== Distribution and habitat ==
The species occurs in eastern Australia. The type locality is Amiens in south-east Queensland. Other published localities include Wallangarra, Queensland, Gosford in New South Wales and Eaglehawk Neck in Tasmania.

== Behaviour ==
The adults are flying mellivores. Flowering plants visited by the bees include Leptospermum species.
