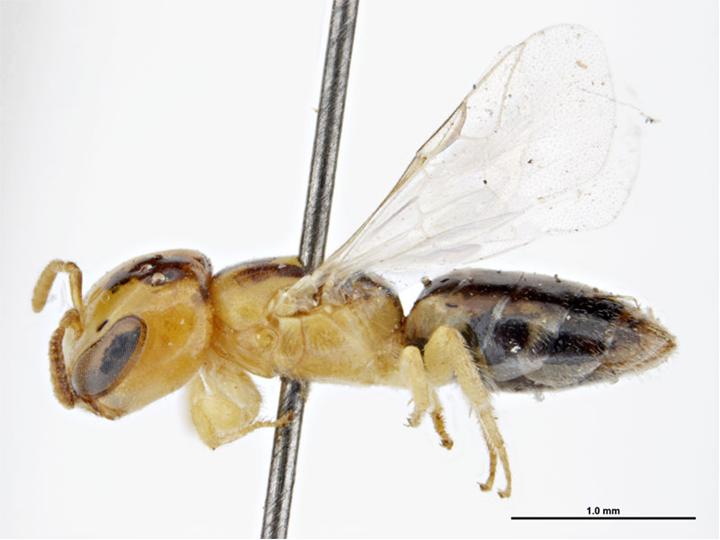
- Male

Scientific classification
- Kingdom: Animalia
- Phylum: Arthropoda
- Clade: Pancrustacea
- Class: Insecta
- Order: Hymenoptera
- Family: Colletidae
- Genus: Euryglossina
- Species: E. aurantia

Binomial name
- Euryglossina aurantia Exley, 1969

Synonyms
- Euryglossina (Turnerella) aurantia Exley, 1969

= Euryglossina aurantia =

Species of bee

Euryglossina aurantia, or Euryglossina (Euryglossina) aurantia, is a species of bee in the family Colletidae and the subfamily Euryglossinae. It is endemic to Australia. It was described in 1969 by Australian entomologist Elizabeth Exley.

== Etymology ==
The species epithet aurantia refers to the mostly orange colour of the female's body.

== Description ==
The body length of females is about 3.6 mm; wing length 2.1 mm.

== Distribution and habitat ==
The species occurs in southern inland Queensland. The type locality is Charleville. It has also been recorded from Glenmorgan.

== Behaviour ==
The adults are flying mellivores. Flowering plants visited by the bees include Eucalyptus species.
