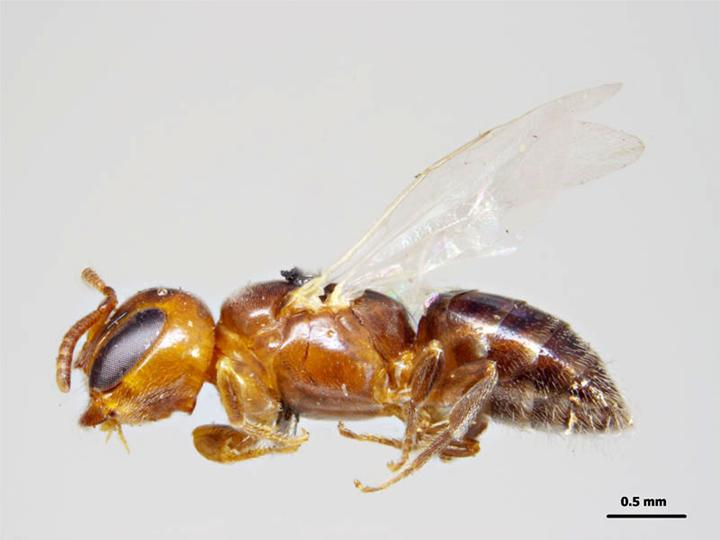
- Male

Scientific classification
- Kingdom: Animalia
- Phylum: Arthropoda
- Clade: Pancrustacea
- Class: Insecta
- Order: Hymenoptera
- Family: Colletidae
- Genus: Euryglossina
- Species: E. gigantica

Binomial name
- Euryglossina gigantica (Exley, 1974)

Synonyms
- Quasihesma gigantica Exley, 1974

= Euryglossina gigantica =

Species of bee

Euryglossina gigantica, or Euryglossina (Quasihesma) gigantica, is a species of bee in the family Colletidae and the subfamily Euryglossinae. It is endemic to Australia. It was described in 1974 by Australian entomologist Elizabeth Exley.

== Description ==
Female body length is 3.5 mm, wing length 2.5 mm; male body length is 3.5 mm, wing length 2.4 mm. Colouration is mainly yellow, black and dark brown.

== Distribution and habitat ==
The species occurs in northern Australia. The type locality is 206 km south of Darwin, Northern Territory.

== Behaviour ==
The adults are flying mellivores. Flowering plants visited by the bees include Corymbia ferruginea.
