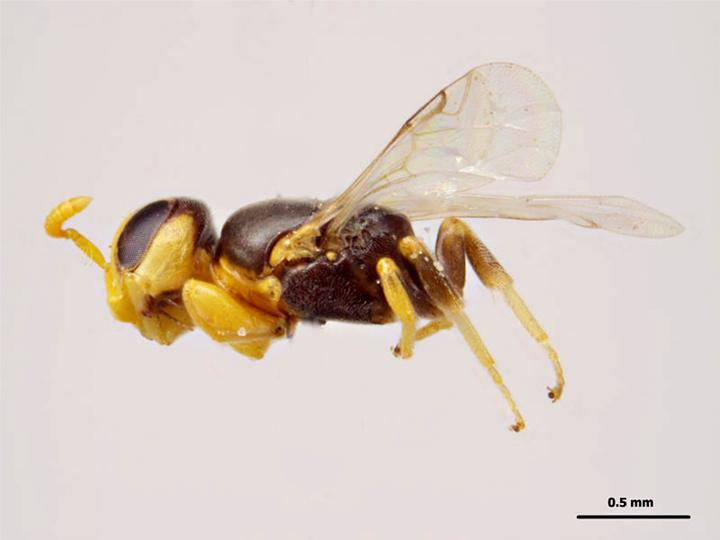
- Male

Scientific classification
- Kingdom: Animalia
- Phylum: Arthropoda
- Clade: Pancrustacea
- Class: Insecta
- Order: Hymenoptera
- Family: Colletidae
- Genus: Euryglossina
- Species: E. walkeri

Binomial name
- Euryglossina walkeri (Exley, 1980)

Synonyms
- Quasihesma walkeri Exley, 1980

= Euryglossina walkeri =

Species of bee

Euryglossina walkeri, or Euryglossina (Quasihesma) walkeri, is a species of bee in the family Colletidae and the subfamily Euryglossinae. It is endemic to Australia. It was described in 1980 by Australian entomologist Elizabeth Exley.

== Etymology ==
The specific epithet walkeri honours K. Walker who assisted Exley in collecting specimens.

== Description ==
Male body length is 2.0 mm, wing length 1.2 mm. The colour is mainly black, yellow and brown.

== Distribution and habitat ==
The species occurs on the Cape York Peninsula of Far North Queensland. The type locality is the Upper Massey River Crossing, 10 km north of Silver Plains Homestead, 69 km east of Coen.

== Behaviour ==
The adults are flying mellivores. Flowering plants visited by the bees include Eucalyptus species.
