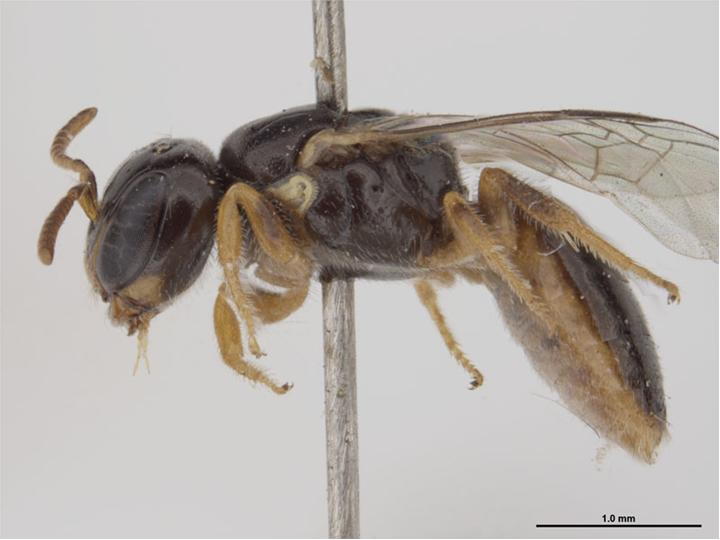
- Female

Scientific classification
- Kingdom: Animalia
- Phylum: Arthropoda
- Clade: Pancrustacea
- Class: Insecta
- Order: Hymenoptera
- Family: Colletidae
- Genus: Euryglossina
- Species: E. narifera

Binomial name
- Euryglossina narifera (Cockerell, 1915)

Synonyms
- Euryglossa narifera Cockerell, 1915

= Euryglossina narifera =

Species of bee

Euryglossina narifera, or Euryglossina (Euryglossina) narifera, is a species of bee in the family Colletidae and the subfamily Euryglossinae. It is endemic to Australia. It was described in 1915 by British-American entomologist Theodore Dru Alison Cockerell.

== Distribution and habitat ==
The species occurs in the South West region of Western Australia. The type locality is Yallingup.

== Behaviour ==
The adults are flying mellivores.
