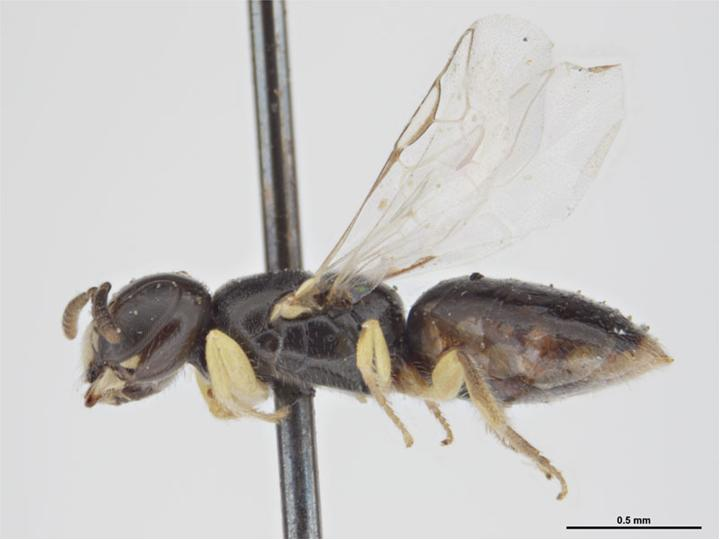
- Female

Scientific classification
- Kingdom: Animalia
- Phylum: Arthropoda
- Clade: Pancrustacea
- Class: Insecta
- Order: Hymenoptera
- Family: Colletidae
- Genus: Euryglossina
- Species: E. atomaria

Binomial name
- Euryglossina atomaria (Cockerell, 1914)

Synonyms
- Euryglossella minuta Cockerell, 1914; Turnerella atomaria fusciventris Cockerell, 1929

= Euryglossina atomaria =

Species of bee

Euryglossina atomaria, or Euryglossina (Euryglossina) atomaria, is a species of bee in the family Colletidae and the subfamily Euryglossinae. It is endemic to Australia. It was described in 1914 by British-American entomologist Theodore Dru Alison Cockerell.

== Distribution and habitat ==
The species occurs in south-east Queensland. The type locality is Brisbane.

== Behaviour ==
The adults are flying mellivores. Flowering plants visited by the bees include Angophora, Callistemon, Tristania, Leptospermum and Melaleuca species.
