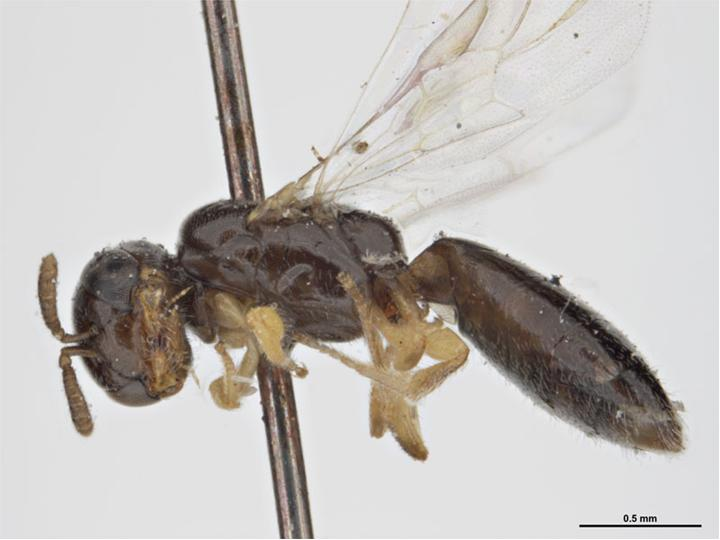
- Female

Scientific classification
- Kingdom: Animalia
- Phylum: Arthropoda
- Clade: Pancrustacea
- Class: Insecta
- Order: Hymenoptera
- Family: Colletidae
- Genus: Euryglossina
- Species: E. gilberti

Binomial name
- Euryglossina gilberti (Cockerell, 1910)

Synonyms
- Turnerella gilberti Cockerell, 1910; Turnerella pachycephala Cockerell, 1929

= Euryglossina gilberti =

Species of bee

Euryglossina gilberti, or Euryglossina (Euryglossina) gilberti, is a species of bee in the family Colletidae and the subfamily Euryglossinae. It is endemic to Australia. It was described in 1910 by British-American entomologist Theodore Dru Alison Cockerell.

== Distribution and habitat ==
The species occurs in eastern Australia. Type localities are Mackay and Brisbane in Queensland. It has also been recorded from New South Wales.

== Behaviour ==
The adults are flying mellivores. Flowering plants visited by the bees include Eucalyptus, Angophora, Callistemon, Eugenia, Leptospermum, Melaleuca and Tristania species.
