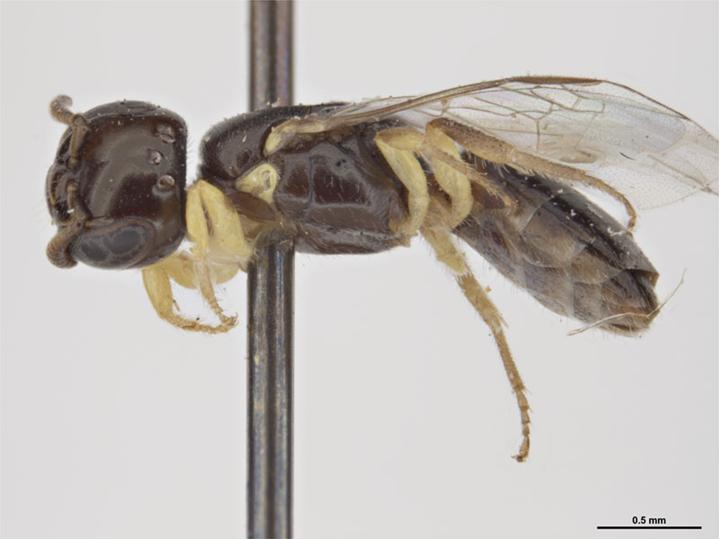
- Female

Scientific classification
- Kingdom: Animalia
- Phylum: Arthropoda
- Clade: Pancrustacea
- Class: Insecta
- Order: Hymenoptera
- Family: Colletidae
- Genus: Euryglossina
- Species: E. perpusilla

Binomial name
- Euryglossina perpusilla (Cockerell, 1910)

Synonyms
- Euryglossa perpusilla Cockerell, 1910; Euryglossina perpusilla nana Cockerell, 1916

= Euryglossina perpusilla =

Species of bee

Euryglossina perpusilla, or Euryglossina (Euryglossina) perpusilla, is a species of bee in the family Colletidae and the subfamily Euryglossinae. It is endemic to Australia. It was described in 1910 by British-American entomologist Theodore Dru Alison Cockerell.

== Distribution and habitat ==
The species occurs across Australia. Type localities are Mackay, Queensland and Kalamunda, Western Australia. It has also been recorded from New South Wales and Tasmania.

== Behaviour ==
The adults are flying mellivores. Flowering plants visited by the bees include Eucalyptus and Tristania species.
