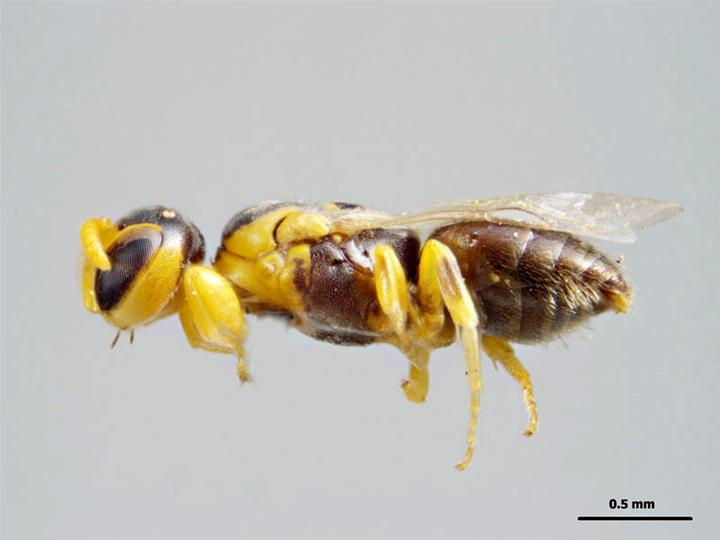
- Male

Scientific classification
- Kingdom: Animalia
- Phylum: Arthropoda
- Clade: Pancrustacea
- Class: Insecta
- Order: Hymenoptera
- Family: Colletidae
- Genus: Euryglossina
- Species: E. melanognatha

Binomial name
- Euryglossina melanognatha (Exley, 1980)

Synonyms
- Quasihesma melanognatha Exley, 1980

= Euryglossina melanognatha =

Species of bee

Euryglossina melanognatha, or Euryglossina (Quasihesma) melanognatha, is a species of bee in the family Colletidae and the subfamily Euryglossinae. It is endemic to Australia. It was described in 1980 by Australian entomologist Elizabeth Exley.

== Etymology ==
The specific epithet melanognatha refers to the black mouthparts of the males.

== Description ==
Male body length is 2.2 mm, wing length 1.3 mm. The colour is mainly black, yellow and brown.

== Distribution and habitat ==
The species occurs on the Cape York Peninsula of Far North Queensland. The type locality is Coen.

== Behaviour ==
The adults are flying mellivores. Flowering plants visited by the bees include Eucalyptus and Tristania species.
