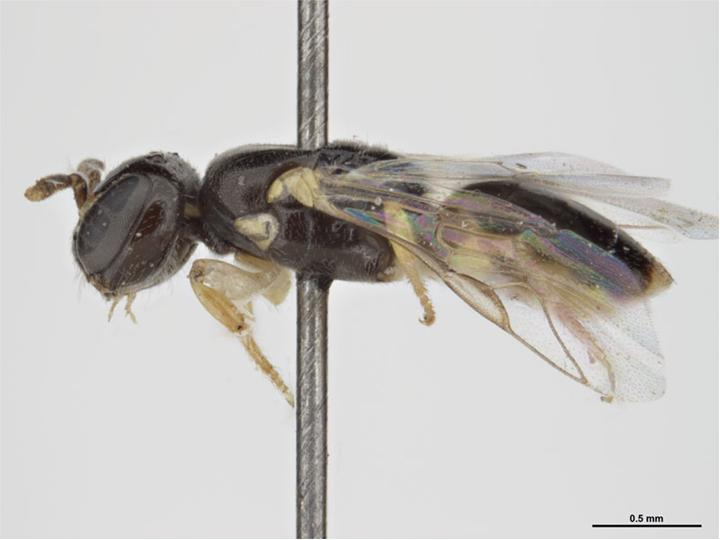
- Female

Scientific classification
- Kingdom: Animalia
- Phylum: Arthropoda
- Clade: Pancrustacea
- Class: Insecta
- Order: Hymenoptera
- Family: Colletidae
- Genus: Euryglossina
- Species: E. argocephala

Binomial name
- Euryglossina argocephala Exley, 1968

Synonyms
- Euryglossina (Turnerella) argocephala Exley, 1968

= Euryglossina argocephala =

Species of bee

Euryglossina argocephala, or Euryglossina (Euryglossina) argocephala, is a species of bee in the family Colletidae and the subfamily Euryglossinae. It is endemic to Australia. It was described in 1968 by Australian entomologist Elizabeth Exley.

== Distribution and habitat ==
The species occurs across mainland Australia. The type locality is Greenmount, Western Australia. Other published localities include Bullsbrook, Western Australia, as well as Glenmorgan and Charleville in Queensland and the Waite Institute in Adelaide.

== Behaviour ==
The adults are flying mellivores. Flowering plants visited by the bees include Eucalyptus species.
