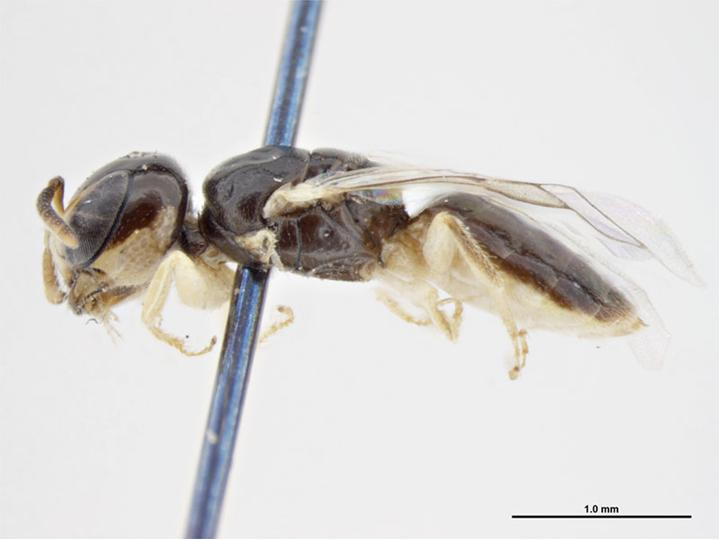
- Female

Scientific classification
- Kingdom: Animalia
- Phylum: Arthropoda
- Clade: Pancrustacea
- Class: Insecta
- Order: Hymenoptera
- Family: Colletidae
- Genus: Euryglossina
- Species: E. proserpinensis

Binomial name
- Euryglossina proserpinensis Exley, 1968

Synonyms
- Euryglossina (Turnerella) proserpinensis Exley, 1968

= Euryglossina proserpinensis =

Species of bee

Euryglossina proserpinensis, or Euryglossina (Euryglossina) proserpinensis, is a species of bee in the family Colletidae and the subfamily Euryglossinae. It is endemic to Australia. It was described in 1968 by Australian entomologist Elizabeth Exley.

== Distribution and habitat ==
The species occurs in north-eastern Australia. The type locality is Proserpine, Queensland.

== Behaviour ==
The adults are flying mellivores. Flowering plants visited by the bees include Eucalyptus, Callistemon, Eugenia and Melaleuca species.

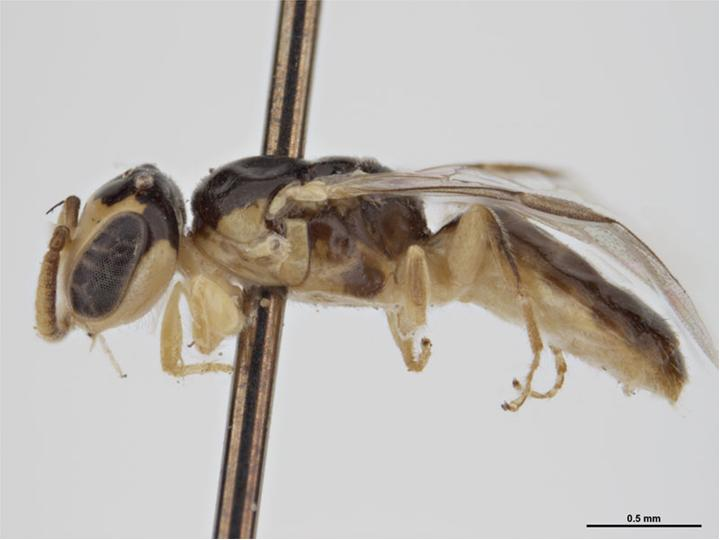
Male
