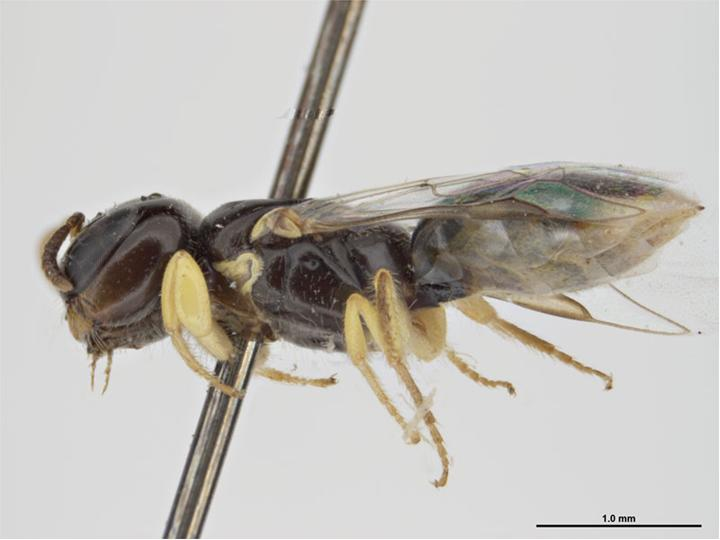
- Female

Scientific classification
- Kingdom: Animalia
- Phylum: Arthropoda
- Clade: Pancrustacea
- Class: Insecta
- Order: Hymenoptera
- Family: Colletidae
- Genus: Euryglossina
- Species: E. flaviventris

Binomial name
- Euryglossina flaviventris Cockerell, 1916

= Euryglossina flaviventris =

Species of bee

Euryglossina flaviventris, or Euryglossina (Euryglossina) flaviventris, is a species of bee in the family Colletidae and the subfamily Euryglossinae. It is endemic to Australia. It was described in 1916 by British-American entomologist Theodore Dru Alison Cockerell.

== Distribution and habitat ==
The species occurs across Australia. The type locality is Mount Yule near Healesville in Victoria.

== Behaviour ==
The adults are flying mellivores. Flowering plants visited by the bees include Eucalyptus, Angophora, Callistemon, Leptospermum and Melaleuca species.
