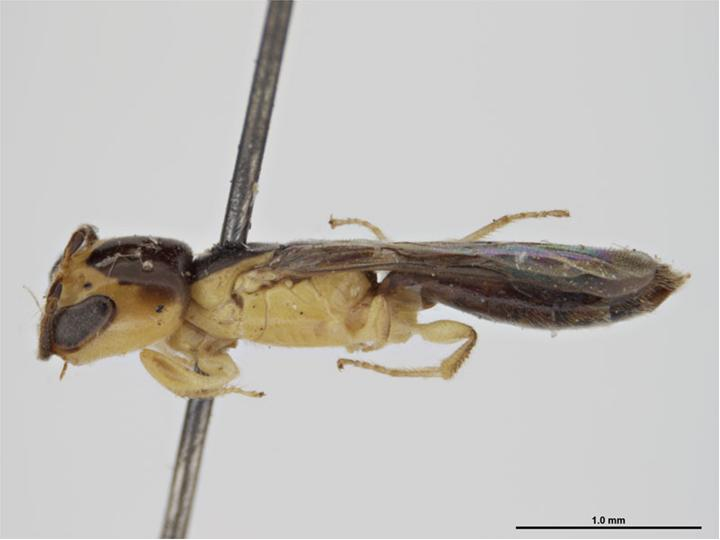
- Female

Scientific classification
- Kingdom: Animalia
- Phylum: Arthropoda
- Clade: Pancrustacea
- Class: Insecta
- Order: Hymenoptera
- Family: Colletidae
- Genus: Euryglossina
- Species: E. megalocephala

Binomial name
- Euryglossina megalocephala Exley, 1968

Synonyms
- Euryglossina (Turnerella) megalocephala Exley, 1968

= Euryglossina megalocephala =

Species of bee

Euryglossina megalocephala, or Euryglossina (Euryglossina) megalocephala, is a species of bee in the family Colletidae and the subfamily Euryglossinae. It is endemic to Australia. It was described in 1968 by Australian entomologist Elizabeth Exley.

== Distribution and habitat ==
The species occurs in south-eastern Queensland. The type locality is the Glass House Mountains. It has also been recorded from Nanango.

== Behaviour ==
The adults are flying mellivores. Flowering plants visited by the bees include Angophora and Melaleuca species.
