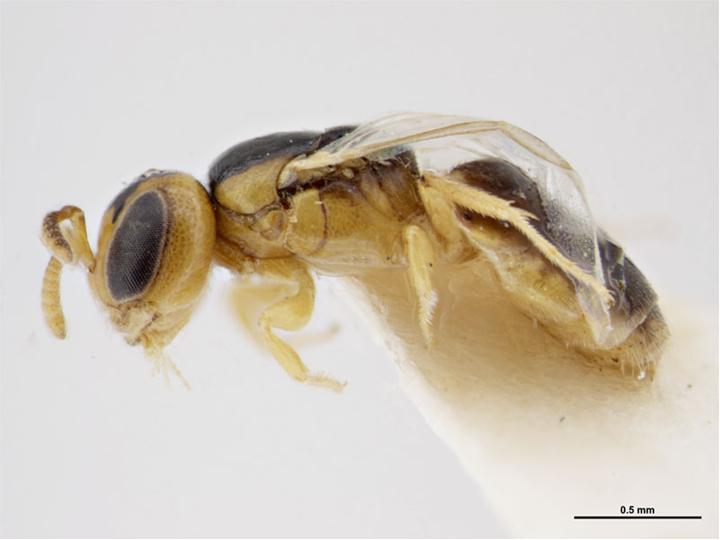
- Female

Scientific classification
- Kingdom: Animalia
- Phylum: Arthropoda
- Clade: Pancrustacea
- Class: Insecta
- Order: Hymenoptera
- Family: Colletidae
- Genus: Euryglossina
- Species: E. oenpelli

Binomial name
- Euryglossina oenpelli (Exley, 1982)

Synonyms
- Euryglossella oenpelli Exley, 1982

= Euryglossina oenpelli =

Species of bee

Euryglossina oenpelli, or Euryglossina (Euryglossella) oenpelli, is a species of bee in the family Colletidae and the subfamily Euryglossinae. It is endemic to Australia. It was described in 1982 by Australian entomologist Elizabeth Exley.

== Distribution and habitat ==
The species occurs in the Top End of the Northern Territory. The type locality is Birraduk Creek, 18 km east by north from Oenpelli.

== Behaviour ==
The adults are flying mellivores. Flowering plants visited by the bees include Eucalyptus species.
