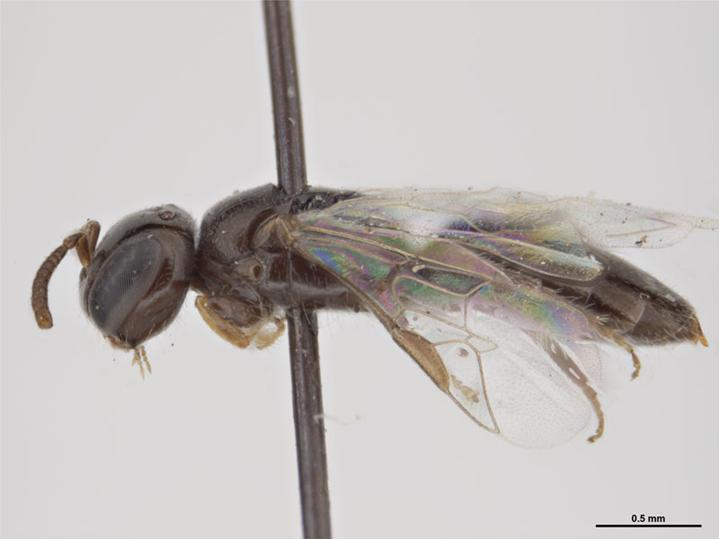
- Female

Scientific classification
- Kingdom: Animalia
- Phylum: Arthropoda
- Clade: Pancrustacea
- Class: Insecta
- Order: Hymenoptera
- Family: Colletidae
- Genus: Euryglossina
- Species: E. intermedia

Binomial name
- Euryglossina intermedia Michener, 1965

= Euryglossina intermedia =

Species of bee

Euryglossina intermedia, or Euryglossina (Euryglossina) intermedia, is a species of bee in the family Colletidae and the subfamily Euryglossinae. It is endemic to Australia. It was described in 1965 by American entomologist Charles Duncan Michener.

== Distribution and habitat ==
The species occurs in eastern Australia. The type locality is Wallangarra in south-east Queensland.

== Behaviour ==
The adults are flying mellivores. Flowering plants visited by the bees include Leptospermum, Tristania and Melaleuca species.
