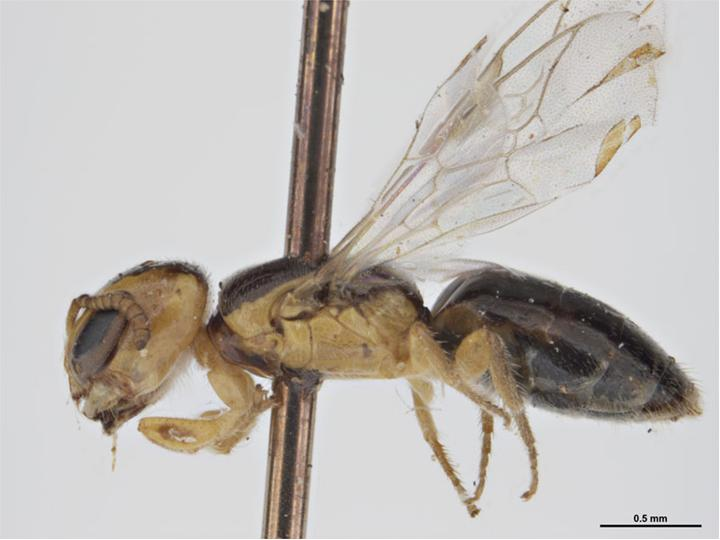
- Female

Scientific classification
- Kingdom: Animalia
- Phylum: Arthropoda
- Clade: Pancrustacea
- Class: Insecta
- Order: Hymenoptera
- Family: Colletidae
- Genus: Euryglossina
- Species: E. xanthocephala

Binomial name
- Euryglossina xanthocephala Exley, 1968

Synonyms
- Euryglossina (Turnerella) xanthocephala Exley, 1968

= Euryglossina xanthocephala =

Species of bee

Euryglossina xanthocephala, or Euryglossina (Euryglossina) xanthocephala, is a species of bee in the family Colletidae and the subfamily Euryglossinae. It is endemic to Australia. It was described in 1968 by Australian entomologist Elizabeth Exley.

== Distribution and habitat ==
The species occurs in south-eastern Queensland. The type locality is Capalaba.

== Behaviour ==
The adults are flying mellivores. Flowering plants visited by the bees include Leptospermum species.
