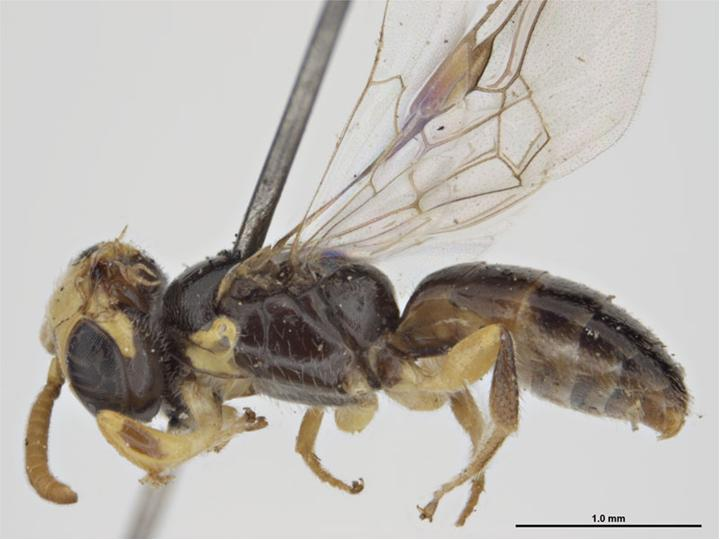
- Male

Scientific classification
- Kingdom: Animalia
- Phylum: Arthropoda
- Clade: Pancrustacea
- Class: Insecta
- Order: Hymenoptera
- Family: Colletidae
- Genus: Euryglossina
- Species: E. mutica

Binomial name
- Euryglossina mutica (Cockerell, 1912)

Synonyms
- Euryglossa mutica Cockerell, 1912

= Euryglossina mutica =

Species of bee

Euryglossina mutica, or Euryglossina (Euryglossina) mutica, is a species of bee in the family Colletidae and the subfamily Euryglossinae. It is endemic to Australia. It was described in 1912 by British-American entomologist Theodore Dru Alison Cockerell.

== Distribution and habitat ==
The species occurs in eastern Australia. The type locality is Sydney. It has also been recorded from Queensland.

== Behaviour ==
The adults are flying mellivores. Flowering plants visited by the bees include Angophora, Callistemon and Tristania species.
