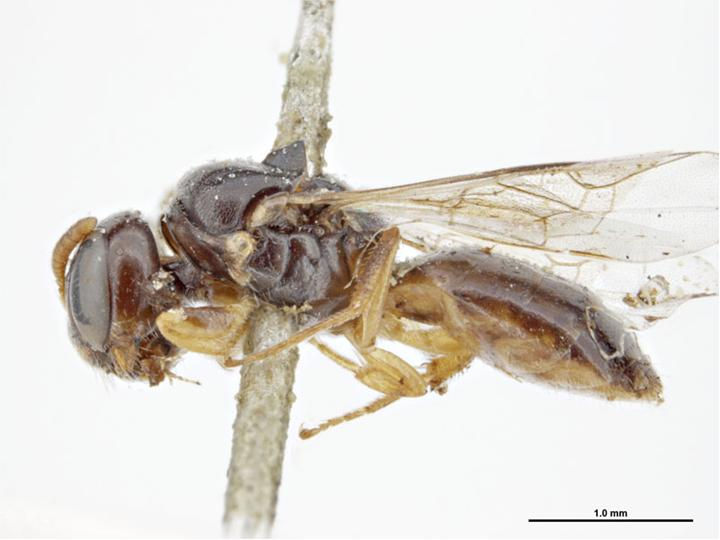
- Female

Scientific classification
- Kingdom: Animalia
- Phylum: Arthropoda
- Clade: Pancrustacea
- Class: Insecta
- Order: Hymenoptera
- Family: Colletidae
- Genus: Euryglossina
- Species: E. hypochroma

Binomial name
- Euryglossina hypochroma Cockerell, 1916

= Euryglossina hypochroma =

Species of bee

Euryglossina hypochroma, or Euryglossina (Euryglossina) hypochroma, is a species of bee in the family Colletidae and the subfamily Euryglossinae. It is endemic to Australia. It was described in 1916 by British-American entomologist Theodore Dru Alison Cockerell.

== Distribution and habitat ==
The species occurs across Australia. The type locality is Perth, Western Australia.

== Behaviour ==
The adults are flying mellivores. They nest in burrows in wood and have sedentary larvae. Flowering plants visited by the bees include Eucalyptus, Angophora, Callistemon, Leptospermum and Melaleuca species.

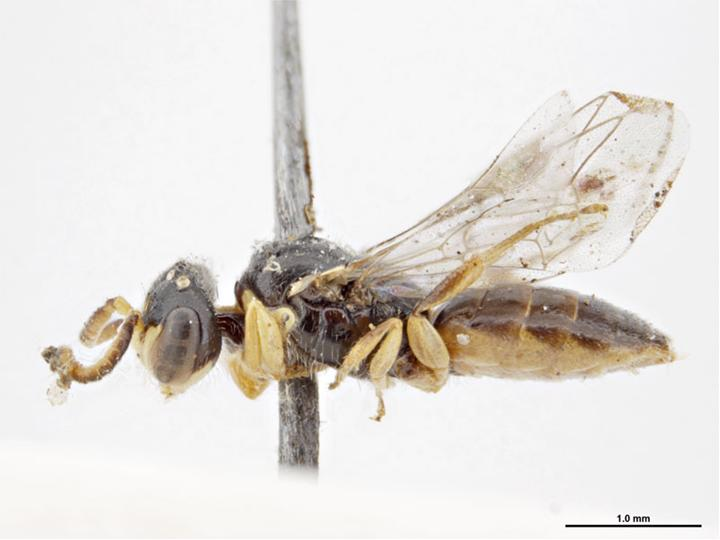
Male
