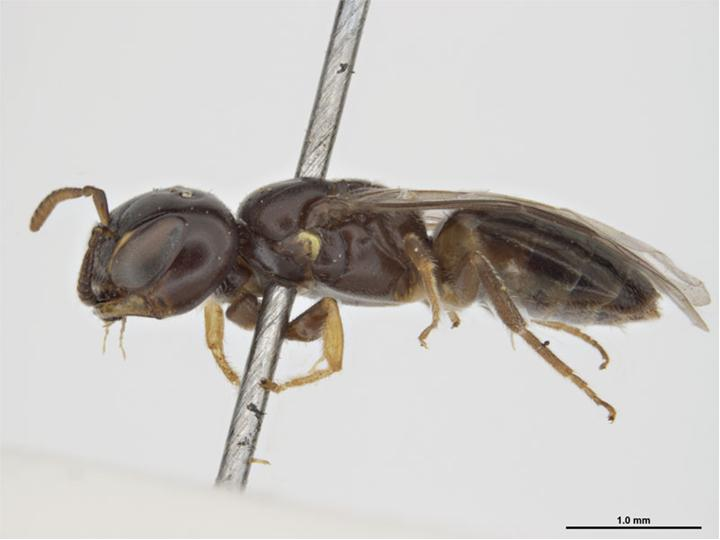
- Female

Scientific classification
- Kingdom: Animalia
- Phylum: Arthropoda
- Clade: Pancrustacea
- Class: Insecta
- Order: Hymenoptera
- Family: Colletidae
- Genus: Euryglossina
- Species: E. healesvillensis

Binomial name
- Euryglossina healesvillensis Exley, 1968

= Euryglossina healesvillensis =

Species of bee

Euryglossina healesvillensis, or Euryglossina (Euryglossina) healesvillensis, is a species of bee in the family Colletidae and the subfamily Euryglossinae. It is endemic to Australia. It was described in 1968 by Australian entomologist Elizabeth Exley.

== Distribution and habitat ==
The species occurs in south-eastern Australia. The type locality is Mount Yule, near Healesville in Victoria. It has also been recorded from New South Wales and Tasmania.

== Behaviour ==
The adults are flying mellivores. Flowering plants visited by the bees include Bursaria, Eucalyptus, Melaleuca and Cotoneaster species.
