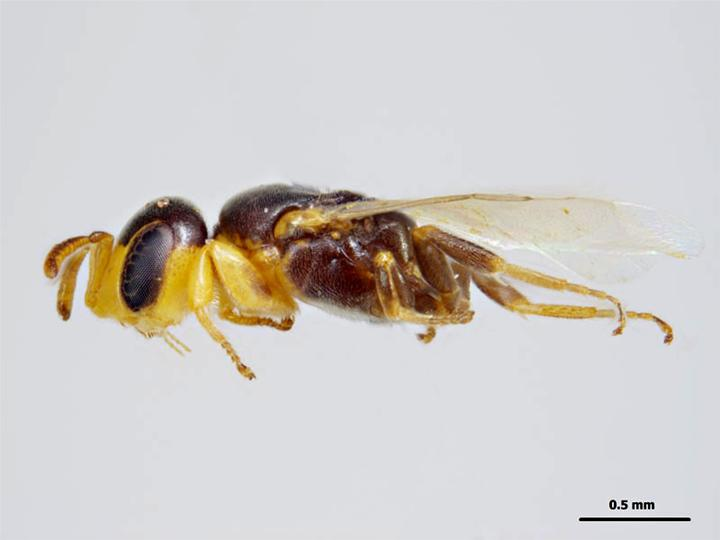
- Male

Scientific classification
- Kingdom: Animalia
- Phylum: Arthropoda
- Clade: Pancrustacea
- Class: Insecta
- Order: Hymenoptera
- Family: Colletidae
- Genus: Euryglossina
- Species: E. scapata

Binomial name
- Euryglossina scapata (Exley, 1980)

Synonyms
- Quasihesma scapata Exley, 1980

= Euryglossina scapata =

Species of bee

Euryglossina scapata, or Euryglossina (Quasihesma) scapata, is a species of bee in the family Colletidae and the subfamily Euryglossinae. It is endemic to Australia. It was described in 1980 by Australian entomologist Elizabeth Exley.

== Etymology ==
The specific epithet scapata refers to the lengthened antennal scapes of the males.

== Description ==
Male body length is 2.1 mm, wing length 1.3 mm. The colour is mainly black, yellow and brown.

== Distribution and habitat ==
The species occurs on the Cape York Peninsula of Far North Queensland. The type locality is 8 km south-east of Cooktown.

== Behaviour ==
The adults are flying mellivores. Flowering plants visited by the bees include Eucalyptus and Eugenia species.
