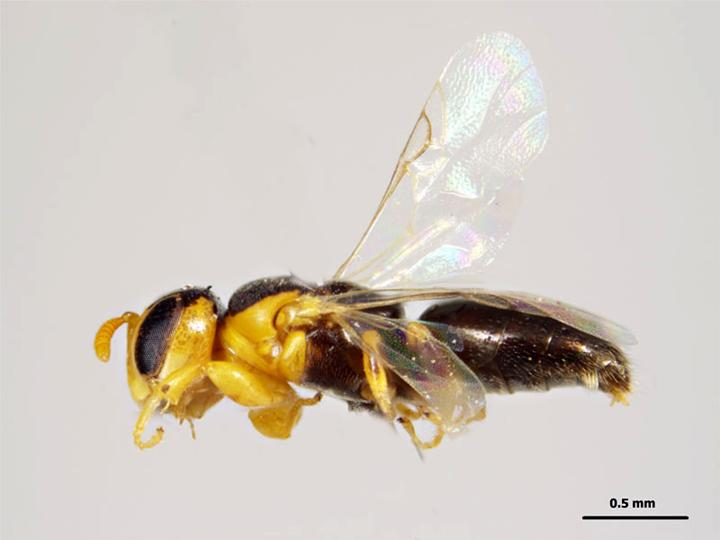
- Male

Scientific classification
- Kingdom: Animalia
- Phylum: Arthropoda
- Clade: Pancrustacea
- Class: Insecta
- Order: Hymenoptera
- Family: Colletidae
- Genus: Euryglossina
- Species: E. cardaleae

Binomial name
- Euryglossina cardaleae Exley, 1968

Synonyms
- Quasihesma cardaleae Exley, 1968

= Euryglossina cardaleae =

Species of bee

Euryglossina cardaleae, or Euryglossina (Quasihesma) cardaleae, is a species of bee in the family Colletidae and the subfamily Euryglossinae. It is endemic to Australia. It was described in 1968 by Australian entomologist Elizabeth Exley.

== Distribution and habitat ==
The species occurs in northern Australia. The type locality is the Hervey Range, some 46 km north-west of Townsville in North Queensland. It has also been recorded from the Top End of the Northern Territory and the Kimberley region of Western Australia.

== Behaviour ==
The adults are flying mellivores. Flowering plants visited by the bees include Eucalyptus, Eugenia, Melaleuca and Tristania species.
