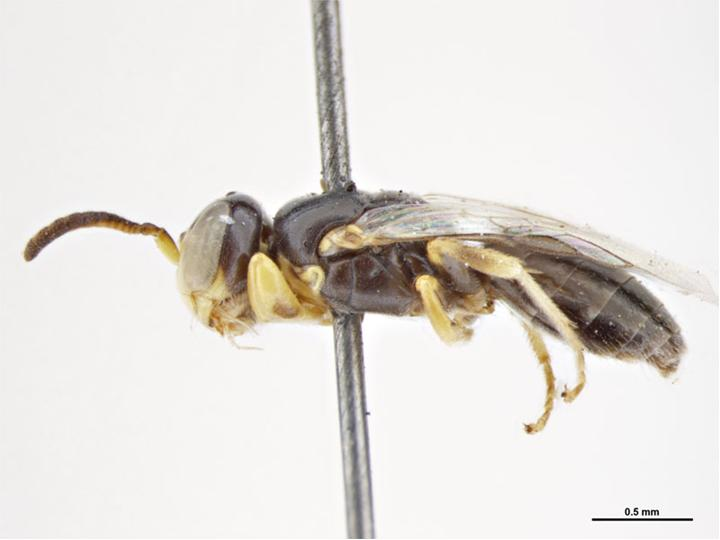
- Female

Scientific classification
- Kingdom: Animalia
- Phylum: Arthropoda
- Clade: Pancrustacea
- Class: Insecta
- Order: Hymenoptera
- Family: Colletidae
- Genus: Euryglossina
- Species: E. neominima

Binomial name
- Euryglossina neominima (Exley, 1974)

Synonyms
- Euryglossella neominima Exley, 1974

= Euryglossina neominima =

Species of bee

Euryglossina neominima, or Euryglossina (Euryglossella) neominima, is a species of bee in the family Colletidae and the subfamily Euryglossinae. It is endemic to Australia. It was described in 1974 by Australian entomologist Elizabeth Exley.

== Description ==
Female body length is 2.8 mm, wing length 1.6 mm; male body length is 2.5 mm, wing length 1.5 mm. Colouration is mainly black and yellow.

== Distribution and habitat ==
The species occurs in North Queensland. The type locality is Castle Hill, Townsville.

== Behaviour ==
The adults are flying mellivores. Flowering plants visited by the bees include Eucalyptus, Grevillea, Melaleuca and Eugenia species.
