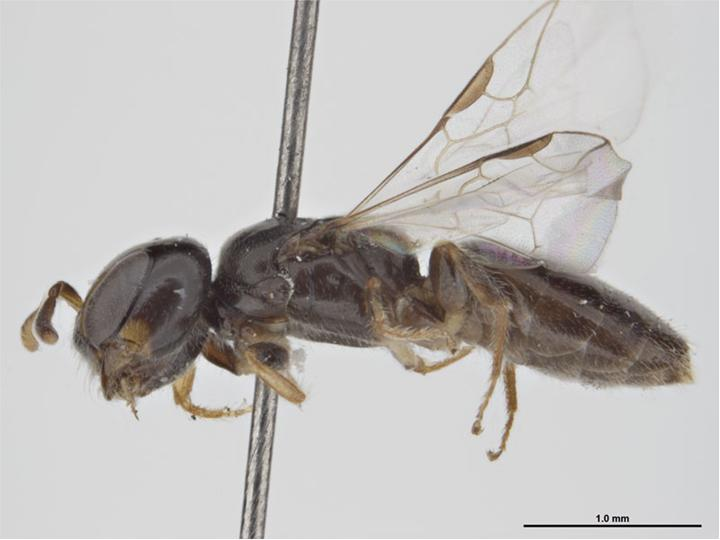
- Female

Scientific classification
- Kingdom: Animalia
- Phylum: Arthropoda
- Clade: Pancrustacea
- Class: Insecta
- Order: Hymenoptera
- Family: Colletidae
- Genus: Euryglossina
- Species: E. nothula

Binomial name
- Euryglossina nothula (Cockerell, 1922)

Synonyms
- Euryglossella nothula Cockerell, 1922

= Euryglossina nothula =

Species of bee

Euryglossina nothula, or Euryglossina (Euryglossina) nothula, is a species of bee in the family Colletidae and the subfamily Euryglossinae. It is endemic to Australia. It was described in 1922 by British-American entomologist Theodore Dru Alison Cockerell.

== Distribution and habitat ==
The species occurs in eastern Australia. The type locality is Bribie Island, Queensland. Other published localities include Brisbane, Beerwah and Gordonvale in Queensland, as well as Bulahdelah in New South Wales.

== Behaviour ==
The adults are flying mellivores. Flowering plants visited by the bees include Eucalyptus, Eugenia and Syncarpia species.
