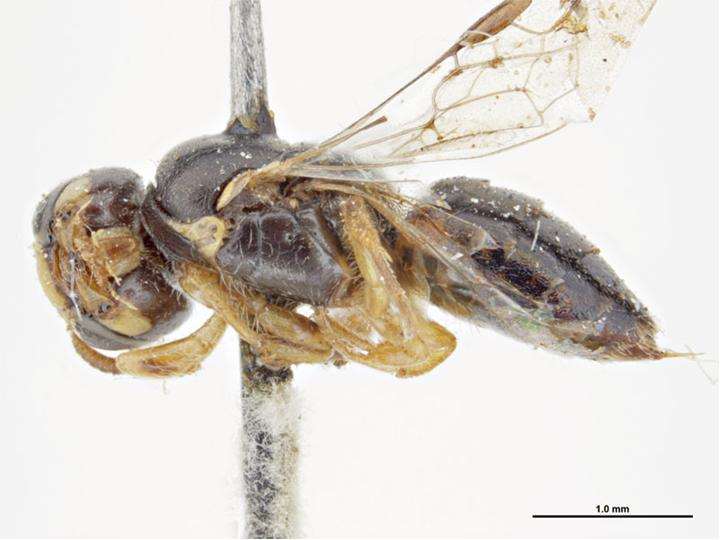
- Female

Scientific classification
- Kingdom: Animalia
- Phylum: Arthropoda
- Clade: Pancrustacea
- Class: Insecta
- Order: Hymenoptera
- Family: Colletidae
- Genus: Euryglossina
- Species: E. kellyi

Binomial name
- Euryglossina kellyi Exley, 1968

= Euryglossina kellyi =

Species of bee

Euryglossina kellyi, or Euryglossina (Euryglossina) kellyi, is a species of bee in the family Colletidae and the subfamily Euryglossinae. It is endemic to Australia. It was described in 1968 by Australian entomologist Elizabeth Exley.

== Distribution and habitat ==
The species occurs in south-eastern Australia. The type locality is Mount Yule, near Healesville in Victoria. It has also been recorded from Sandringham and Scotts Creek, as well as Adelaide in South Australia.

== Behaviour ==
The adults are flying mellivores. Flowering plants visited by the bees include Banksia and Eucalyptus species.
