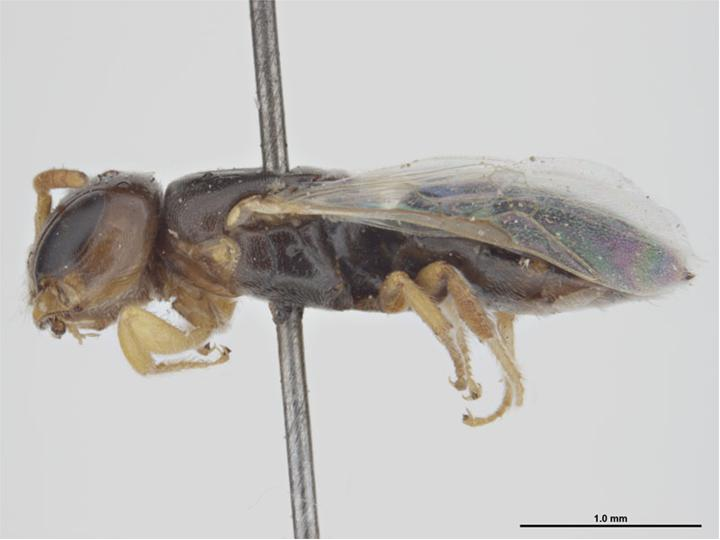
- Female

Scientific classification
- Kingdom: Animalia
- Phylum: Arthropoda
- Clade: Pancrustacea
- Class: Insecta
- Order: Hymenoptera
- Family: Colletidae
- Genus: Euryglossina
- Species: E. lobiocula

Binomial name
- Euryglossina lobiocula Exley, 1968

= Euryglossina lobiocula =

Species of bee

Euryglossina lobiocula, or Euryglossina (Euryglossina) lobiocula, is a species of bee in the family Colletidae and the subfamily Euryglossinae. It is endemic to Australia. It was described in 1968 by Australian entomologist Elizabeth Exley.

== Distribution and habitat ==
The species occurs in central and eastern inland Australia. The type locality is Mica Creek, Mount Isa in north-west Queensland. It has also been recorded from Alice Springs in the Northern Territory and Tenterfield, New South Wales.

== Behaviour ==
The adults are flying mellivores. Flowering plants visited by the bees include Angophora and Eucalyptus species.

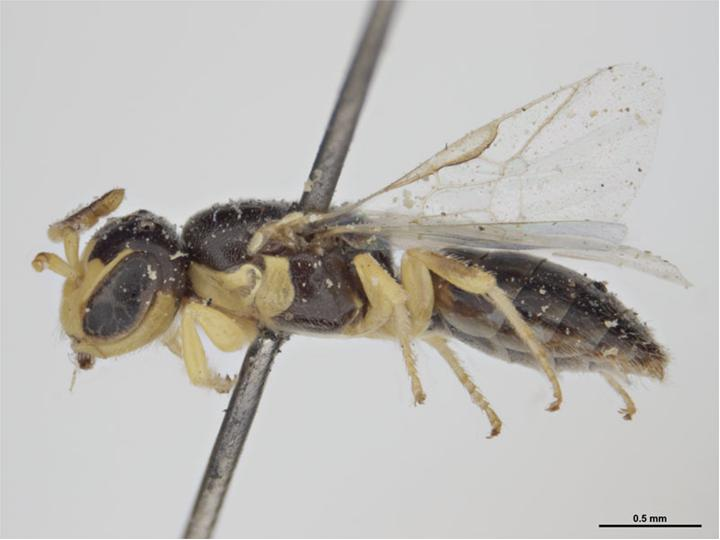
Male
