= Euryglossina semipurpurea =

Scientific classification
- Kingdom: Animalia
- Phylum: Arthropoda
- Clade: Pancrustacea
- Class: Insecta
- Order: Hymenoptera
- Family: Colletidae
- Genus: Euryglossina
- Species: E. semipurpurea

Binomial name
- Euryglossina semipurpurea (Cockerell, 1910)

Synonyms
- Euryglossa semipurpurea Cockerell, 1910

Species of bee

Euryglossina semipurpurea, or Euryglossina (Euryglossina) semipurpurea, is a species of bee in the family Colletidae and the subfamily Euryglossinae. It is endemic to Australia. It was described in 1910 by British-American entomologist Theodore Dru Alison Cockerell.

== Distribution and habitat ==
The species occurs in eastern Australia. The type locality is Mackay, Queensland.

== Behaviour ==
The adults are flying mellivores. Flowering plants visited by the bees include Eucalyptus species.
