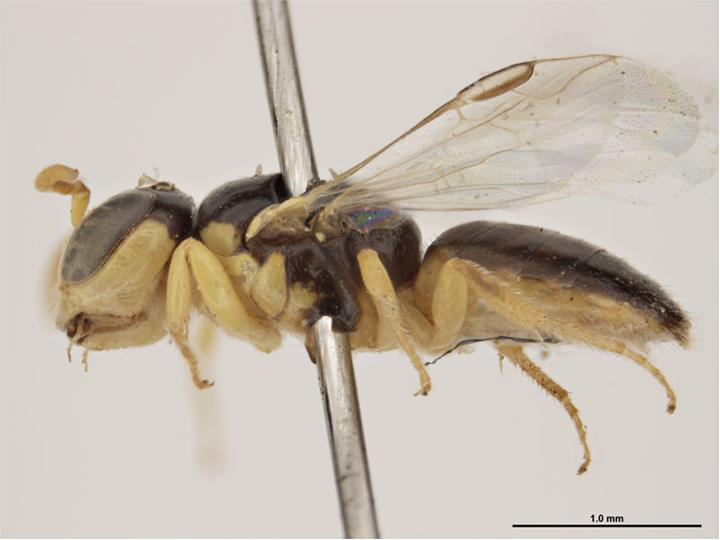
- Female

Scientific classification
- Kingdom: Animalia
- Phylum: Arthropoda
- Clade: Pancrustacea
- Class: Insecta
- Order: Hymenoptera
- Family: Colletidae
- Genus: Euryglossina
- Species: E. glauerti

Binomial name
- Euryglossina glauerti (Rayment, 1934)

Synonyms
- Turnerella glauerti Rayment, 1934

= Euryglossina glauerti =

Species of bee

Euryglossina glauerti, or Euryglossina (Euryglossina) glauerti, is a species of bee in the family Colletidae and the subfamily Euryglossinae. It is endemic to Australia. It was described in 1934 by Australian entomologist Tarlton Rayment.

== Distribution and habitat ==
The species occurs in south-west Western Australia. The type locality is Rottnest Island. It has also been recorded from Gnowangerup.

== Behaviour ==
The adults are flying mellivores.

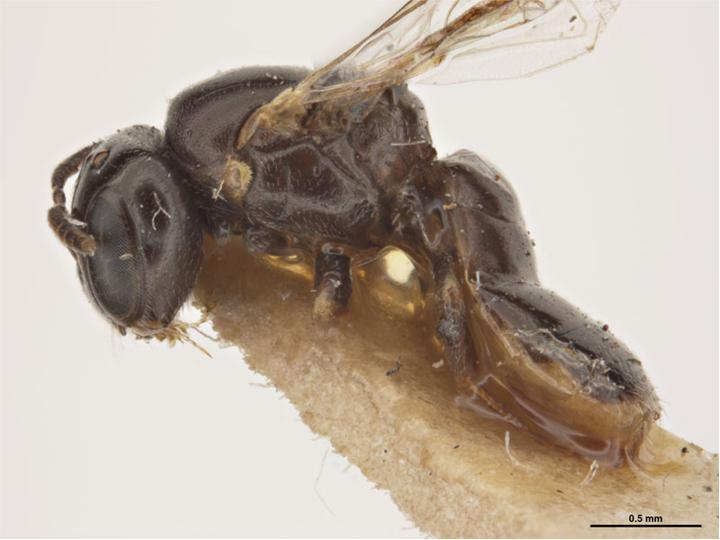
Male
