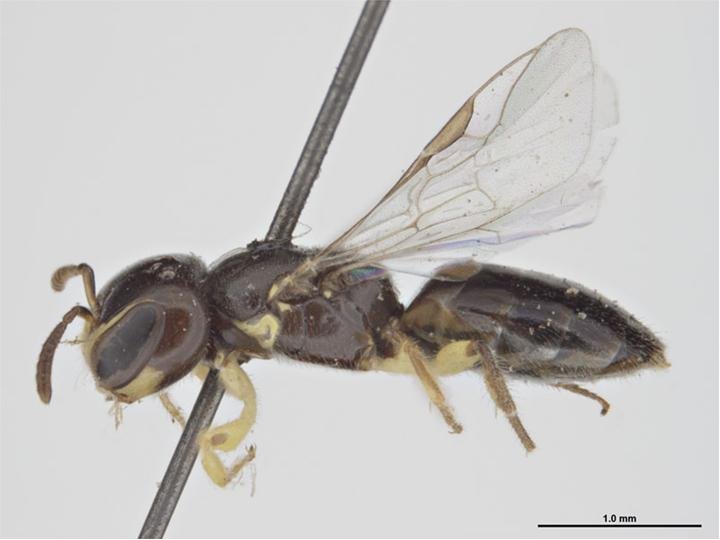
- Female

Scientific classification
- Kingdom: Animalia
- Phylum: Arthropoda
- Clade: Pancrustacea
- Class: Insecta
- Order: Hymenoptera
- Family: Colletidae
- Genus: Euryglossina
- Species: E. xanthogena

Binomial name
- Euryglossina xanthogena (Rayment, 1935)

Synonyms
- Turnerella xanthogena Rayment, 1935; Euryglossella bicolor Rayment, 1935

= Euryglossina xanthogena =

Species of bee

Euryglossina xanthogena, or Euryglossina (Euryglossina) xanthogena, is a species of bee in the family Colletidae and the subfamily Euryglossinae. It is endemic to Australia. It was described in 1934 by Australian entomologist Tarlton Rayment.

== Description ==
Body length of females is 4 mm. Colouring is black and yellow.

== Distribution and habitat ==
The species occurs in eastern Australia. The type locality is Melbourne, Victoria.

== Behaviour ==
The adults are solitary flying mellivores that nest in beetle-infested timber. Flowering plants visited by the bees include Eucalyptus, Eugenia, Melaleuca and Pongamia species.

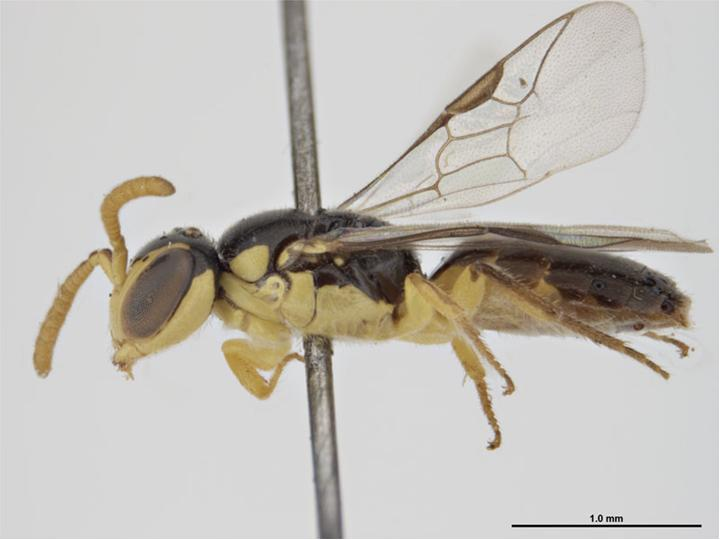
Male
