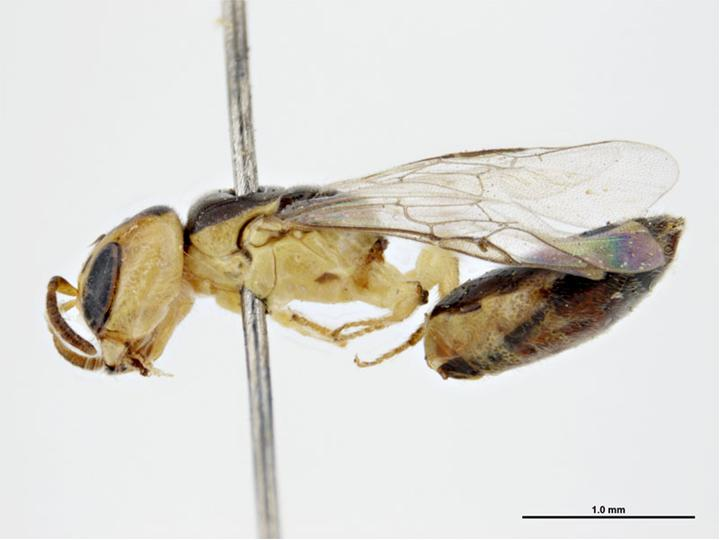
- Female

Scientific classification
- Kingdom: Animalia
- Phylum: Arthropoda
- Clade: Pancrustacea
- Class: Insecta
- Order: Hymenoptera
- Family: Colletidae
- Genus: Euryglossina
- Species: E. sulcata

Binomial name
- Euryglossina sulcata Exley, 1968

Synonyms
- Euryglossina (Turnerella) sulcata Exley, 1968

= Euryglossina sulcata =

Species of bee

Euryglossina sulcata, or Euryglossina (Euryglossina) sulcata, is a species of bee in the family Colletidae and the subfamily Euryglossinae. It is endemic to Australia. It was described in 1968 by Australian entomologist Elizabeth Exley.

== Distribution and habitat ==
The species occurs in eastern Australia. The type locality is the Glass House Mountains in south-east Queensland. It has also been recorded from Victoria.

== Behaviour ==
The adults are flying mellivores. Flowering plants visited by the bees include Leptospermum, Melaleuca and Syncarpia species.
