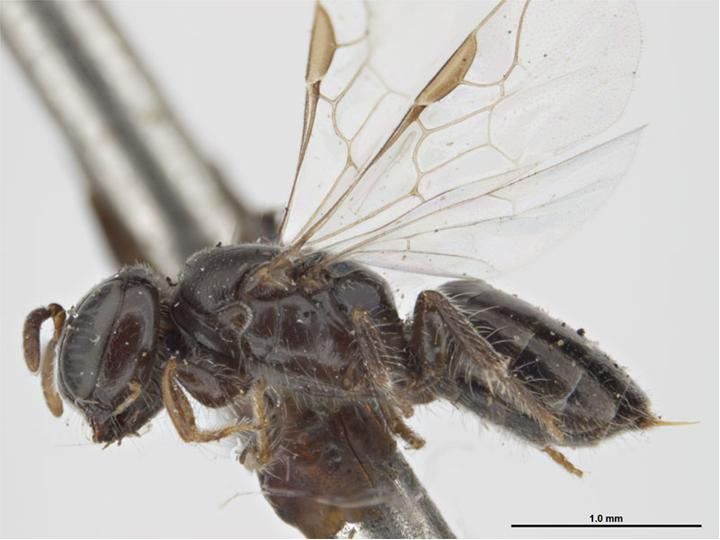
- Female

Scientific classification
- Kingdom: Animalia
- Phylum: Arthropoda
- Clade: Pancrustacea
- Class: Insecta
- Order: Hymenoptera
- Family: Colletidae
- Genus: Euryglossina
- Species: E. subnothula

Binomial name
- Euryglossina subnothula (Cockerell, 1929)

Synonyms
- Turnerella subnothula Cockerell, 1929

= Euryglossina subnothula =

Species of bee

Euryglossina subnothula, or Euryglossina (Euryglossina) subnothula, is a species of bee in the family Colletidae and the subfamily Euryglossinae. It is endemic to Australia. It was described in 1929 by British-American entomologist Theodore Dru Alison Cockerell.

== Description ==
The colouring is mainly black.

== Distribution and habitat ==
The species occurs in eastern Australia. The type locality is Oxley, Brisbane, in south-east Queensland.

== Behaviour ==
The adults are flying mellivores. Flowering plants visited by the bees include Callistemon, Leptospermum and Melaleuca species.
