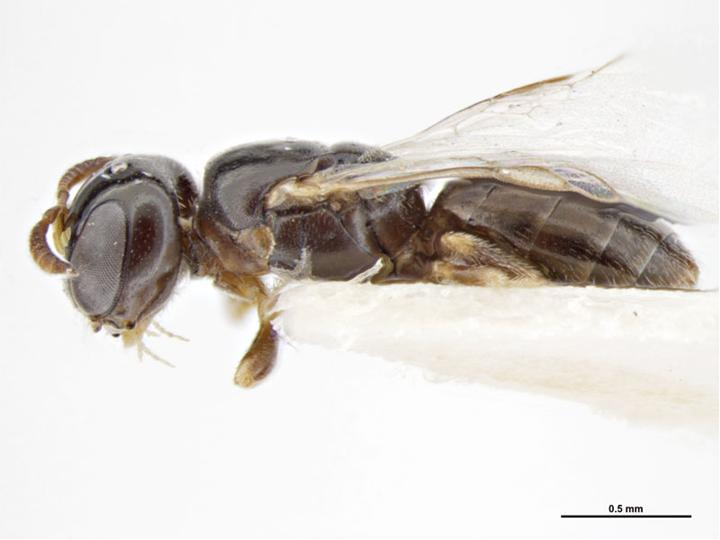
- Female

Scientific classification
- Kingdom: Animalia
- Phylum: Arthropoda
- Clade: Pancrustacea
- Class: Insecta
- Order: Hymenoptera
- Family: Colletidae
- Genus: Euryglossina
- Species: E. darwiniensis

Binomial name
- Euryglossina darwiniensis (Exley, 1974)

Synonyms
- Euryglossella darwiniensis Exley, 1974

= Euryglossina darwiniensis =

Species of bee

Euryglossina darwiniensis, or Euryglossina (Euryglossella) darwiniensis, is a species of bee in the family Colletidae and the subfamily Euryglossinae. It is endemic to Australia. It was described in 1974 by Australian entomologist Elizabeth Exley.

== Etymology ==
The species epithet darwiniensis refers to the type locality.

== Description ==
The body length of females is about 2.5 mm, wing length 1.2 mm; male body length is 2.5 mm, wing length 1.1 mm. Colouration is mainly black and yellow.

== Distribution and habitat ==
The species occurs in northern Australia. The type locality is Elizabeth River, 34 km south of Darwin, Northern Territory. It has also been recorded from Queensland.

== Behaviour ==
The adults are flying mellivores. Flowering plants visited by the bees include Syzygium armstrongii and Corymbia papuana.
