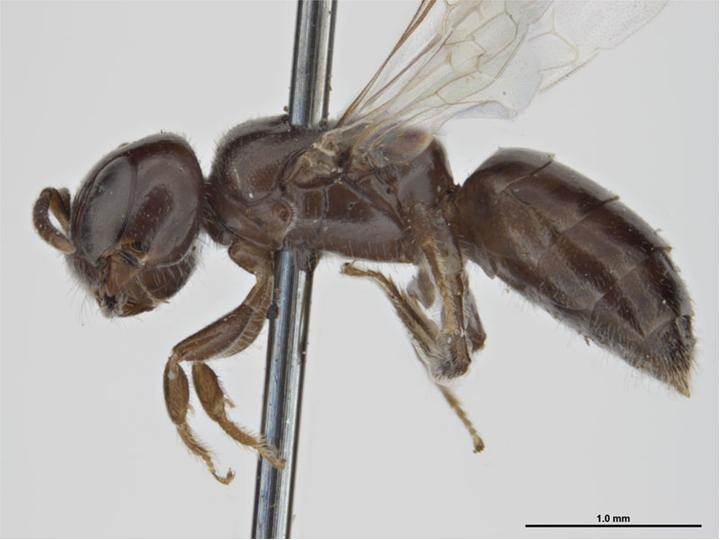
- Female

Scientific classification
- Kingdom: Animalia
- Phylum: Arthropoda
- Clade: Pancrustacea
- Class: Insecta
- Order: Hymenoptera
- Family: Colletidae
- Genus: Euryglossina
- Species: E. globuliceps

Binomial name
- Euryglossina globuliceps (Cockerell, 1918)

Synonyms
- Euryglossella globuliceps Cockerell, 1918

= Euryglossina globuliceps =

Species of bee

Euryglossina globuliceps, or Euryglossina (Euryglossina) globuliceps, is a species of bee in the family Colletidae and the subfamily Euryglossinae. It is endemic to Australia. It was described in 1918 by British-American entomologist Theodore Dru Alison Cockerell.

== Description ==
The female holotype has a body length of less than 4 mm. Colouration is mainly black, with a faintly purplish abdomen. The head is large, shiny at the front, with broad cheeks.

== Distribution and habitat ==
The species occurs in south-eastern Australia. The type locality is Brisbane, Queensland.

== Behaviour ==
The adults are flying mellivores. Flowering plants visited by the bees include Eucalyptus, Leptospermum, Lomatia, Syncarpia, Tristania and Melaleuca species.
