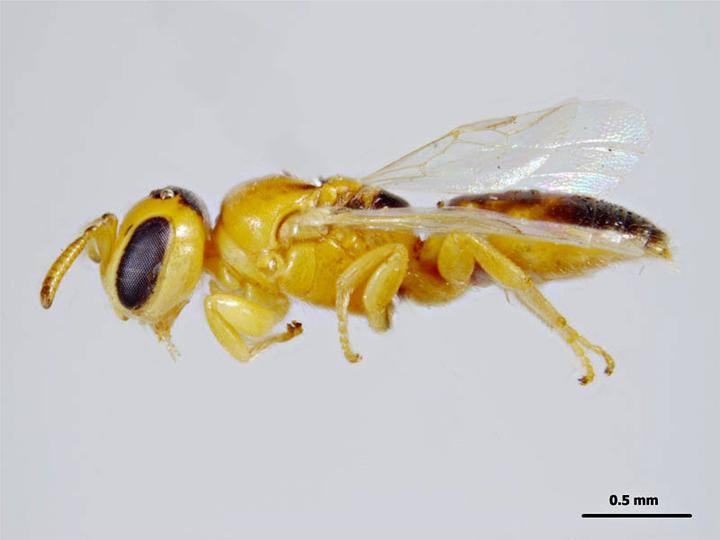
- Male

Scientific classification
- Kingdom: Animalia
- Phylum: Arthropoda
- Clade: Pancrustacea
- Class: Insecta
- Order: Hymenoptera
- Family: Colletidae
- Genus: Euryglossina
- Species: E. leucognatha

Binomial name
- Euryglossina leucognatha (Exley, 1974)

Synonyms
- Quasihesma leucognatha Exley, 1974

= Euryglossina leucognatha =

Species of bee

Euryglossina leucognatha, or Euryglossina (Quasihesma) leucognatha, is a species of bee in the family Colletidae and the subfamily Euryglossinae. It is endemic to Australia. It was described in 1974 by Australian entomologist Elizabeth Exley.

== Description ==
Male body length is 2.5 mm, wing length 1.5 mm. Colouration is mainly black, dark brown and yellow.

== Distribution and habitat ==
The species occurs in northern Australia. The type locality is 24 km east of Katherine, Northern Territory.

== Behaviour ==
The adults are flying mellivores. Flowering plants visited by the bees include Eucalyptus papuana, Tristania, Melaleuca and Eugenia species.
