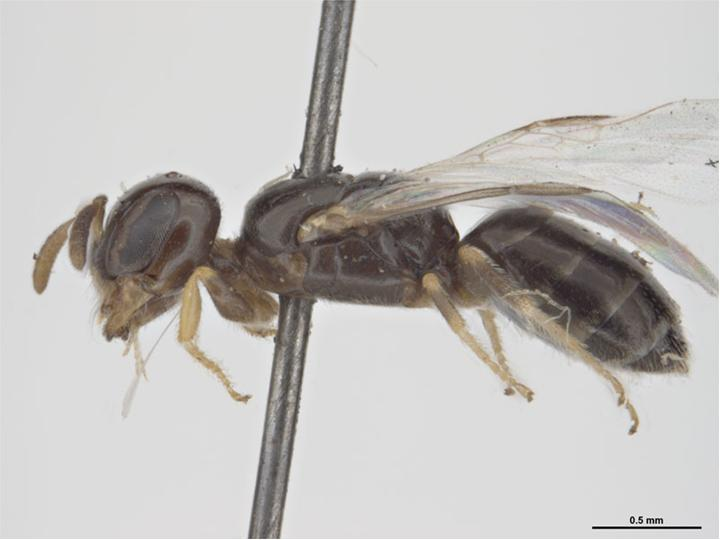
- Female

Scientific classification
- Kingdom: Animalia
- Phylum: Arthropoda
- Clade: Pancrustacea
- Class: Insecta
- Order: Hymenoptera
- Family: Colletidae
- Genus: Euryglossina
- Species: E. cornuta

Binomial name
- Euryglossina cornuta (Cockerell, 1929)

Synonyms
- Zalygus cornutus Cockerell, 1929

= Euryglossina cornuta =

Species of bee

Euryglossina cornuta, or Euryglossina (Euryglossella) cornuta, is a species of bee in the family Colletidae and the subfamily Euryglossinae. It is endemic to Australia. It was described in 1929 by British-American entomologist Theodore Dru Alison Cockerell.

== Description ==
The body length of the female holotype is estimated to be about 3 mm, and mainly black in colour.

== Distribution and habitat ==
The species occurs in eastern Australia. The type locality is Brisbane.

== Behaviour ==
The adults are flying mellivores. Flowering plants visited by the bees include Eucalyptus, Angophora, Callistemon, Melaleuca and Tristania species.

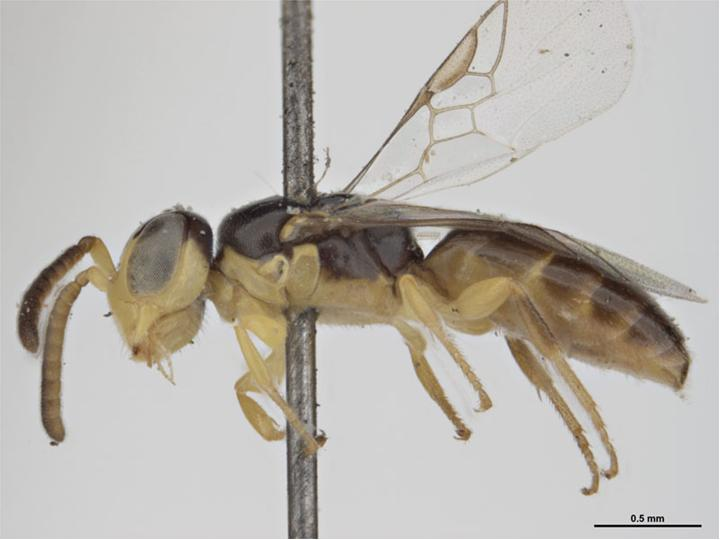
Male
