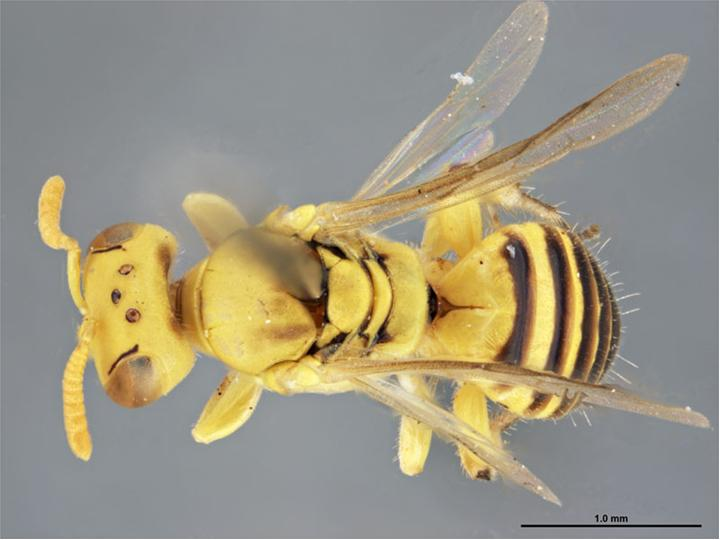
- Male

Scientific classification
- Kingdom: Animalia
- Phylum: Arthropoda
- Clade: Pancrustacea
- Class: Insecta
- Order: Hymenoptera
- Family: Colletidae
- Genus: Brachyhesma
- Species: B. storeyi

Binomial name
- Brachyhesma storeyi Exley, 1977

= Brachyhesma storeyi =

Species of bee

Brachyhesma storeyi, or Brachyhesma (Microhesma) storeyi, is a species of bee in the family Colletidae and the subfamily Euryglossinae. It is endemic to Australia. It was described in 1977 by Australian entomologist Elizabeth Exley.

== Distribution and habitat ==
The species occurs in Far North Queensland. The type locality is 8 km north-west of Mount Molloy. It has also been recorded from Petford.

== Behaviour ==
The adults are flying mellivores. Flowering plants visited by the bees include Eucalyptus species.

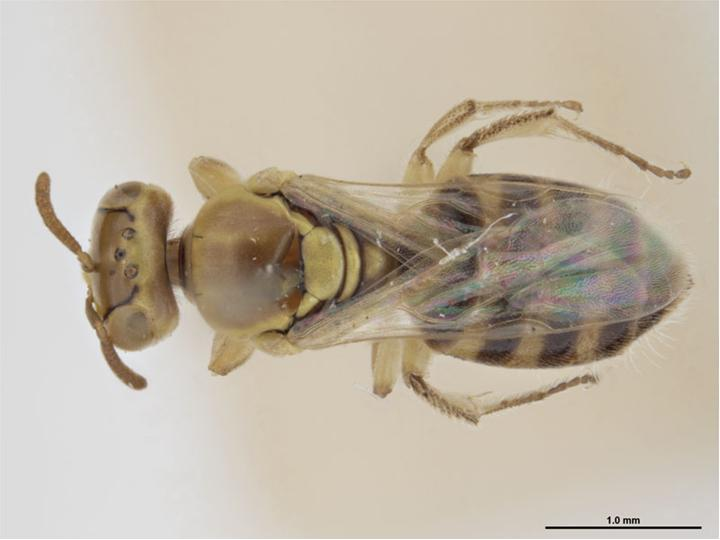
Female
