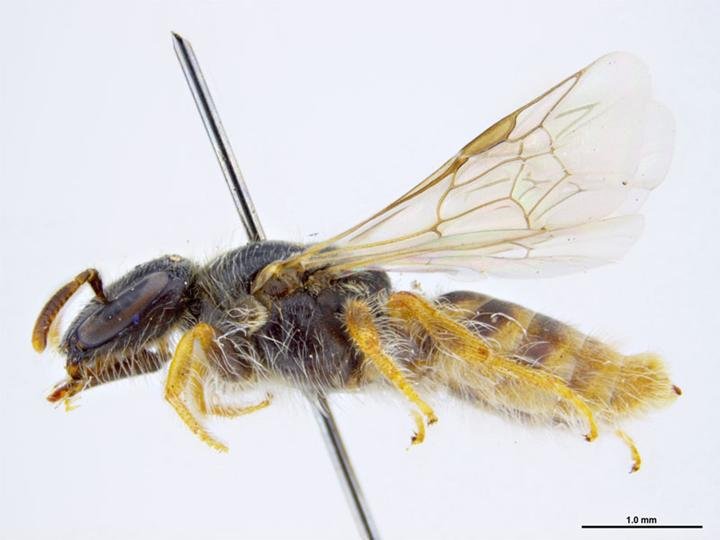
- Female

Scientific classification
- Kingdom: Animalia
- Phylum: Arthropoda
- Clade: Pancrustacea
- Class: Insecta
- Order: Hymenoptera
- Family: Colletidae
- Genus: Euhesma
- Species: E. aurata

Binomial name
- Euhesma aurata (Exley, 1998)

Synonyms
- Euryglossa (Euhesma) aurata Exley, 1998

= Euhesma aurata =

Species of bee

Euhesma aurata, or Euhesma (Euhesma) aurata, is a species of bee in the family Colletidae and the subfamily Euryglossinae. It is endemic to Australia. It was described in 1998 by Australian entomologist Elizabeth Exley.

== Etymology ==
The specific epithet aurata refers to the golden-brown colouring on the legs and gaster of the female.

== Description ==
Body length of the female is 5.0 mm, wing length 4.0 mm; body length of the male 4.0 mm, wing length 3.0 mm. Colouration is black, brown and yellow.

== Distribution and habitat ==
The species occurs in southern inland Western Australia. The type locality is 35 km east of Norseman.

== Behaviour ==
The adults are flying mellivores. Flowering plants visited by the bees include Eremophila species.

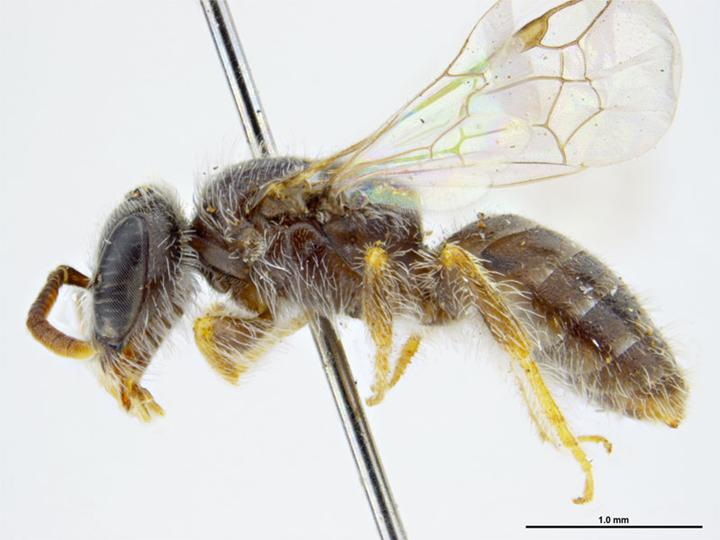
Male
