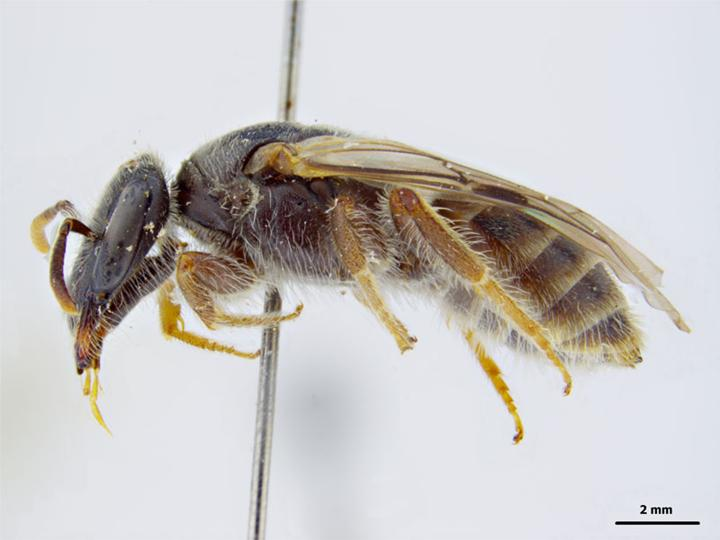
- Female

Scientific classification
- Kingdom: Animalia
- Phylum: Arthropoda
- Clade: Pancrustacea
- Class: Insecta
- Order: Hymenoptera
- Family: Colletidae
- Genus: Euhesma
- Species: E. nalbarra

Binomial name
- Euhesma nalbarra (Exley, 1998)

Synonyms
- Euryglossa (Euhesma) nalbarra Exley, 1998

= Euhesma nalbarra =

Species of bee

Euhesma nalbarra, or Euhesma (Euhesma) nalbarra, is a species of bee in the family Colletidae and the subfamily Euryglossinae. It is endemic to Australia. It was described in 1998 by Australian entomologist Elizabeth Exley.

== Etymology ==
The specific epithet nalbarra refers to the type locality.

== Description ==
Body length of the female is 7.0 mm, wing length 5.0 mm; that of the male is body length 5.5 mm, wing length 4.0 mm. Colouration is mainly black, dark brown and yellowish.

== Distribution and habitat ==
The species occurs in inland Western Australia. The type locality is 7 km west of Nalbarra Station homestead, some 80 km south-west of Mount Magnet, in the Mid West region.

== Behaviour ==
The adults are flying mellivores. Flowering plants visited by the bees include Eremophila species.

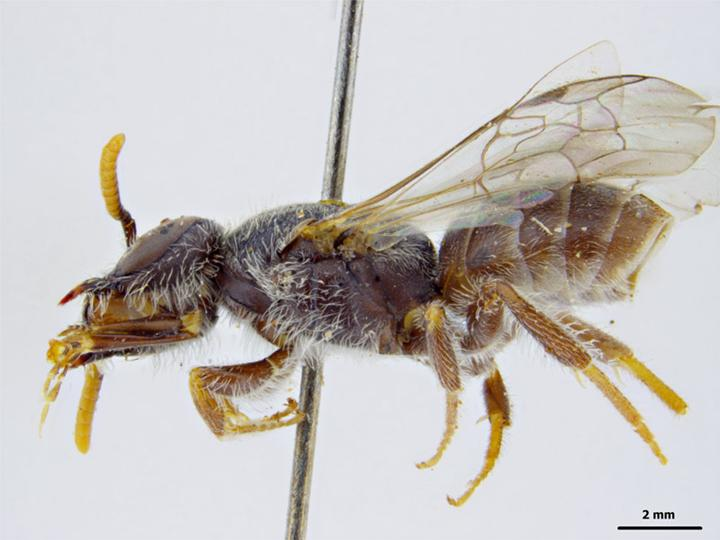
Male
