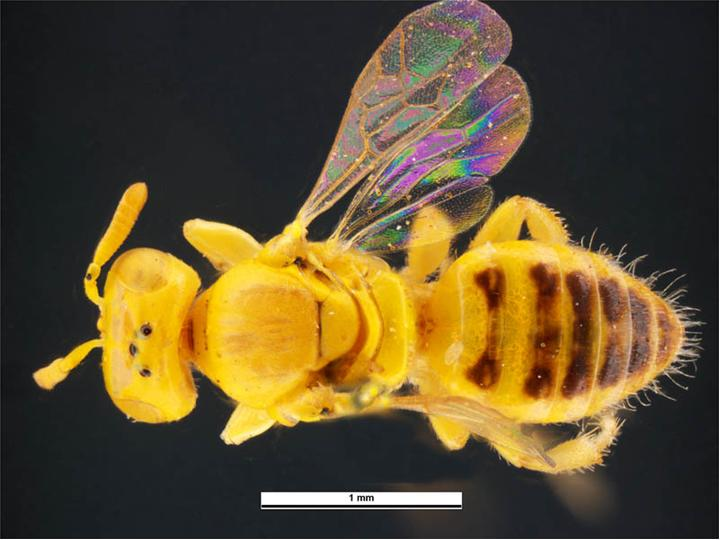
- Male

Scientific classification
- Kingdom: Animalia
- Phylum: Arthropoda
- Clade: Pancrustacea
- Class: Insecta
- Order: Hymenoptera
- Family: Colletidae
- Genus: Brachyhesma
- Species: B. bitrichopedalis

Binomial name
- Brachyhesma bitrichopedalis Exley, 1968

= Brachyhesma bitrichopedalis =

Species of bee

Brachyhesma bitrichopedalis, or Brachyhesma (Microhesma) bitrichopedalis, is a species of bee in the family Colletidae and the subfamily Euryglossinae. It is endemic to Australia. It was described in 1968 by Australian entomologist Elizabeth Exley.

== Distribution and habitat ==
The species occurs in northern and eastern Australia. The type locality is Murphys Creek, Queensland.

== Behaviour ==
The adults are flying mellivores. Flowering plants visited by the bees include Angophora, Eucalyptus and Leptospermum species.
