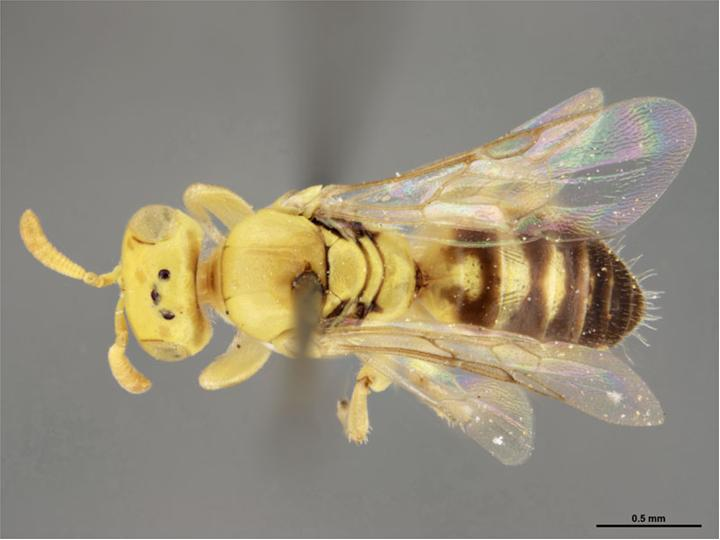
- Male

Scientific classification
- Kingdom: Animalia
- Phylum: Arthropoda
- Clade: Pancrustacea
- Class: Insecta
- Order: Hymenoptera
- Family: Colletidae
- Genus: Brachyhesma
- Species: B. josephinae

Binomial name
- Brachyhesma josephinae Exley, 1968

= Brachyhesma josephinae =

Species of bee

Brachyhesma josephinae, or Brachyhesma (Microhesma) josephinae, is a species of bee in the family Colletidae and the subfamily Euryglossinae. It is endemic to Australia. It was described in 1968 by Australian entomologist Elizabeth Exley.

== Distribution and habitat ==
The species occurs in northern Queensland. The type locality is Ross River. It has also been recorded from Millaroo, Mount Molloy and Mareeba.

== Behaviour ==
The adults are flying mellivores. Flowering plants visited by the bees include Melaleuca and Eucalyptus species.
