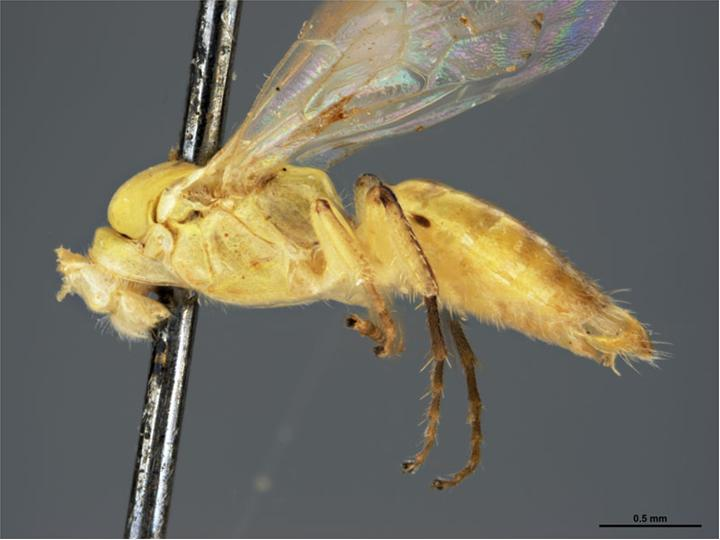
- Male

Scientific classification
- Kingdom: Animalia
- Phylum: Arthropoda
- Clade: Pancrustacea
- Class: Insecta
- Order: Hymenoptera
- Family: Colletidae
- Genus: Brachyhesma
- Species: B. minya

Binomial name
- Brachyhesma minya Exley, 1975

= Brachyhesma minya =

Species of bee

Brachyhesma minya, or Brachyhesma (Microhesma) minya, is a species of bee in the family Colletidae and the subfamily Euryglossinae. It is endemic to Australia. It was described in 1975 by Australian entomologist Elizabeth Exley.

== Etymology ==
The specific epithet minya is an Aboriginal word from South Australia meaning "small".

== Description ==
Colouring is yellow with brown markings. Body length of males is 3.3 mm, wing length 2.1 mm; body length of females is 3.7 mm, wing length 2.6 mm.

== Distribution and habitat ==
The species occurs in South Australia. The type locality is the Gawler Ranges.

== Behaviour ==
The adults are flying mellivores. Flowering plants visited by the bees include eucalypt species.
