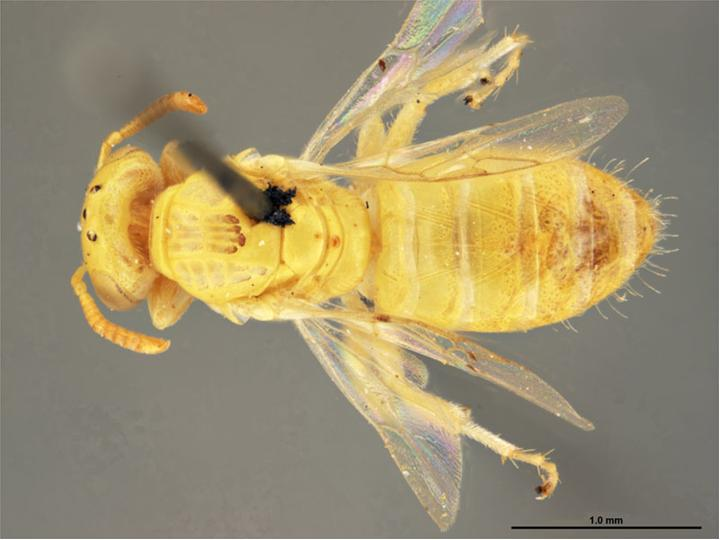
- Male

Scientific classification
- Kingdom: Animalia
- Phylum: Arthropoda
- Clade: Pancrustacea
- Class: Insecta
- Order: Hymenoptera
- Family: Colletidae
- Genus: Brachyhesma
- Species: B. deserticola

Binomial name
- Brachyhesma deserticola Exley, 1968

= Brachyhesma deserticola =

Species of bee

Brachyhesma deserticola, or Brachyhesma (Henicohesma) deserticola, is a species of bee in the family Colletidae and the subfamily Euryglossinae. It is endemic to Australia. It was described in 1968 by Australian entomologist Elizabeth Exley.

== Etymology ==
The specific epithet deserticola refers to the desert areas where specimens were collected.

== Description ==
Colouration is mainly yellow. Males: body length 3 mm, wing length 2.3 mm; females: body length 3.7 mm, wing length 2.5 mm.

== Distribution and habitat ==
The species occurs in central Australia. The type locality is Mica Creek, near Mount Isa in north-west Queensland. It has also been recorded from Barrow Creek, Northern Territory.

== Behaviour ==
The adults are flying mellivores. Flowering plants visited by the bees include Eucalyptus species.
