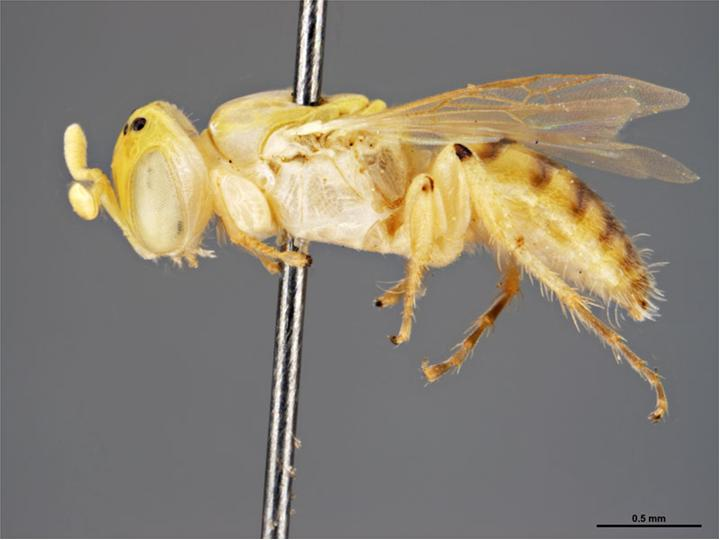
- Male Brachyhesma rossi

Scientific classification
- Kingdom: Animalia
- Phylum: Arthropoda
- Clade: Pancrustacea
- Class: Insecta
- Order: Hymenoptera
- Family: Colletidae
- Genus: Brachyhesma
- Species: B. rossi

Binomial name
- Brachyhesma rossi Exley, 1968

= Brachyhesma rossi =

Species of bee

Brachyhesma rossi, or Brachyhesma (Microhesma) rossi, is a species of bee in the family Colletidae and the subfamily Euryglossinae. It is endemic to Australia. It was described in 1968 by Australian entomologist Elizabeth Exley.

== Distribution and habitat ==
The species occurs across tropical northern Australia. The type locality is Gregory Downs in the Gulf Country of north-west Queensland.

== Behaviour ==
The adults are flying mellivores.
