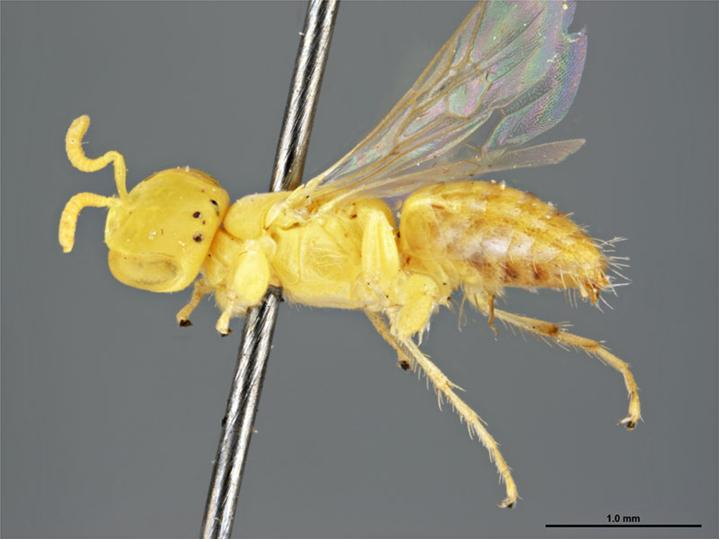
- Male

Scientific classification
- Kingdom: Animalia
- Phylum: Arthropoda
- Clade: Pancrustacea
- Class: Insecta
- Order: Hymenoptera
- Family: Colletidae
- Genus: Brachyhesma
- Species: B. barrowensis

Binomial name
- Brachyhesma barrowensis Exley, 1968

= Brachyhesma barrowensis =

Species of bee

Brachyhesma barrowensis, or Brachyhesma (Brachyhesma) barrowensis , is a species of bee in the family Colletidae and the subfamily Euryglossinae. It is endemic to Australia. It was described in 1968 by Australian entomologist Elizabeth Exley.

== Distribution and habitat ==
There are scattered records of the species from across Australia. The type locality is Barrow Creek in the Northern Territory.

== Behaviour ==
The adults are flying mellivores. Flowering plants visited by the bees include Eucalyptus species.
