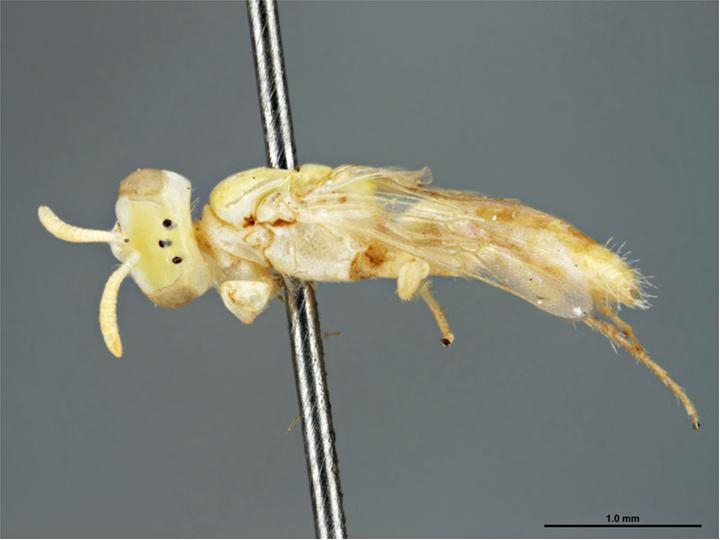
- Male

Scientific classification
- Kingdom: Animalia
- Phylum: Arthropoda
- Clade: Pancrustacea
- Class: Insecta
- Order: Hymenoptera
- Family: Colletidae
- Genus: Brachyhesma
- Species: B. monteithae

Binomial name
- Brachyhesma monteithae Exley, 1975

= Brachyhesma monteithae =

Species of bee

Brachyhesma monteithae, or Brachyhesma (Brachyhesma) monteithae, is a species of bee in the family Colletidae and the subfamily Euryglossinae. It is endemic to Australia. It was described in 1975 by Australian entomologist Elizabeth Exley.

== Etymology ==
The specific epithet monteithae honours Sybil Monteith who collected the type specimens.

== Description ==
Colouring is mainly yellow to pale yellow. Body length of males is 3.3 mm, wing length 2.0 mm; body length of females is 3.5 mm, wing length 2.3 mm.

== Distribution and habitat ==
The species occurs in the Gulf Country of north-west Queensland. The type locality is the Gregory River at Gregory Downs.

== Behaviour ==
The adults are flying mellivores.
