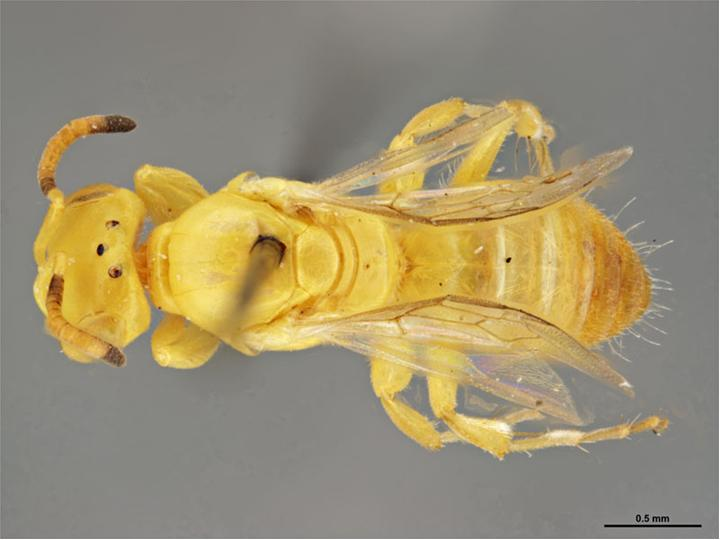
- Male

Scientific classification
- Kingdom: Animalia
- Phylum: Arthropoda
- Clade: Pancrustacea
- Class: Insecta
- Order: Hymenoptera
- Family: Colletidae
- Genus: Brachyhesma
- Species: B. longicornis

Binomial name
- Brachyhesma longicornis Exley, 1968

= Brachyhesma longicornis =

Species of bee

Brachyhesma longicornis, or Brachyhesma (Brachyhesma) longicornis, is a species of bee in the family Colletidae and the subfamily Euryglossinae. It is endemic to Australia. It was described in 1968 by Australian entomologist Elizabeth Exley.

== Distribution and habitat ==
The species occurs in central Australia. The type locality is MacDonald Downs Station, some 280 km north-east of Alice Springs in the southern part of the Northern Territory.

== Behaviour ==
The adults are flying mellivores.
