= Euryglossula pinnulata =

Scientific classification
- Kingdom: Animalia
- Phylum: Arthropoda
- Clade: Pancrustacea
- Class: Insecta
- Order: Hymenoptera
- Family: Colletidae
- Genus: Euryglossula
- Species: E. pinnulata

Binomial name
- Euryglossula pinnulata Batley, 2016

Species of bee

Euryglossula pinnulata is a species of bee in the family Colletidae and the subfamily Euryglossinae. It is endemic to Australia. It was described in 2016 by Australian entomologist Michael Batley.

== Etymology ==
The specific epithet pinnulata (Latin: "feather-like") refers to the setae on the fifth sternum of the male.

== Description ==
Body length of females is 3.25 mm, that of males 2.7 mm; head width of females is 0.9 mm, males 0.85 mm.

== Distribution and habitat ==
The species occurs in southern inland Queensland. The type locality is 19 km south of Charleville.

== Behaviour ==
Flowering plants visited by the bees include Calytrix longiflora.
