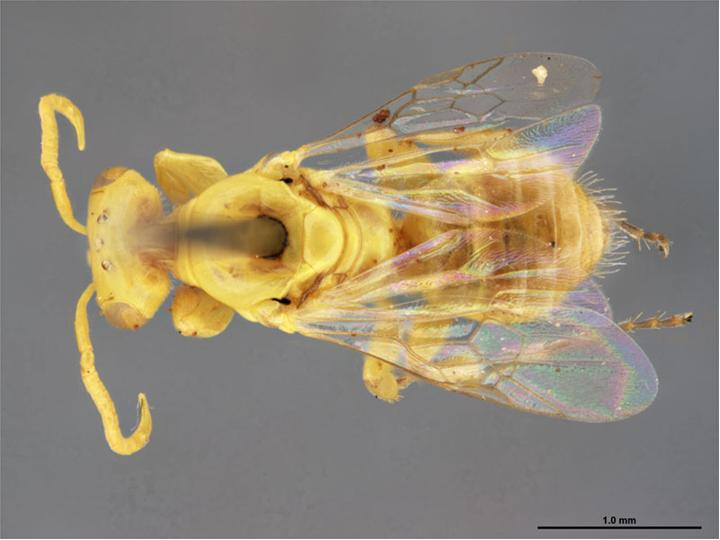
- Male

Scientific classification
- Kingdom: Animalia
- Phylum: Arthropoda
- Clade: Pancrustacea
- Class: Insecta
- Order: Hymenoptera
- Family: Colletidae
- Genus: Brachyhesma
- Species: B. apicalis

Binomial name
- Brachyhesma apicalis Exley, 1969

= Brachyhesma apicalis =

Species of bee

Brachyhesma apicalis, or Brachyhesma (Brachyhesma) apicalis, is a species of bee in the family Colletidae and the subfamily Euryglossinae. It is endemic to Australia. It was described in 1969 by Australian entomologist Elizabeth Exley.

== Description ==
The male is about 3.5 mm long, with wings approximately 2.2 mm long. The antennae are very long; the first segment (the scape) is slightly longer than the eye, while the second (the pedicel) is a marginally longer than the first flagellar (whip-like) segment. The final segment of the antenna is long, narrows towards the middle, and widens again at the tip (apex).

The facial depressions (facial foveae) are inconspicuous, and are about four-ninths of the eye’s length. The clypeus (the plate above the upper lip) has an indented rim and when viewed from the front, appears about six times wider than it is long in the middle. From the side, the cheek (genal) area behind the eye is narrower than the eye itself. The distance between the simple eyes on top of the head (the ocelli) is about the same as the distance between an ocellus and the nearby compound eye. The upper surfaces of the head and thorax are covered with an extremely fine reticulation.

The body is mostly yellow, with slight brown shading on the rear part of the thorax (the propodeum) and has faint horizontal bands across the abdominal segments. The hind tarsi are brownish, and narrow lateral depressions on the body are brown.

The front femur is greatly expanded and flattened at its base. On the segment near the base of the hind leg (trochanter) there is a brush of long hairs, at least five of which are broadened, flattened, and fringed at the tips. The hind tibia bears a few bristles near its end, and the first segment of the hind tarsus is shorter than the hind tibia. The pads between the claws (arolias) are large and black.

The wings are transparent, with translucent veins and pterostigma. The wings have very few large hairs (macrotrichia), and these are almost completely absent from the basal third of the forewing. The pterostigma is approximately the same length as the marginal vein.

Hair on the body is generally sparse, though some longer hairs occur on the underside of the abdomen and near its tip.

The female is similar to the male in overall size, about 3.5 mm long, with slightly longer wings of about 2.3 mm. The antennae are shorter than in the male. The scape is about three-fifths the length of the eye, and the pedicel is as long as the first two flagellar segments combined. Most of the flagellar segments are wider than they are long, except for the final segment.

The facial foveae are dark brown and extend less than halfway down the eye. The clypeus is even broader than in the male, measuring nearly eight times wider than its length in the middle. From the side, the cheek area remains narrower than the eye. The distance between the ocelli is greater than the distance between an ocellus and the compound eye. As in the male, the upper surfaces of the head and thorax show fine, net-like structures.

The body is likewise yellow, though the tips of the mandibles are reddish. As in the male, the wings are transparent and almost lack macrotrichia in the basal cell of the forewing.

The front femur in the female is expanded in a more triangular shape rather than strongly flattened. The first segment of the hind tarsus is again shorter than the hind tibia, and the arolia are large and black.

The wings have translucent veins and pterostigma, with extremely sparse macrotrichia. In the female, the pterostigma is slightly longer than the marginal vein.

Hair coverage is sparse overall, but longer hairs occur along the margin of the clypeus, on the legs, on the underside of the body, and near the tip of the abdomen.

== Distribution and habitat ==
The type locality is Charleville, Queensland. It has also been reported from Millstream Station in Western Australia.

== Behaviour ==
The adults are flying mellivores. Flowering plants visited by the bees include Eucalyptus species.
