= Euryglossula elizabethae =

Scientific classification
- Kingdom: Animalia
- Phylum: Arthropoda
- Clade: Pancrustacea
- Class: Insecta
- Order: Hymenoptera
- Family: Colletidae
- Genus: Euryglossula
- Species: E. elizabethae

Binomial name
- Euryglossula elizabethae Batley, 2016

Species of bee

Euryglossula elizabethae is a species of bee in the family Colletidae and the subfamily Euryglossinae. It is endemic to Australia. It was described in 2016 by Australian entomologist Michael Batley.

== Etymology ==
The specific epithet elizabethae honours entomologist Elizabeth Exley for her contributions to the study of the Euryglossinae.

== Description ==
Body length of females is 3.2 mm, that of males 2.7 mm.

== Distribution and habitat ==
The species occurs in north-western Victoria. The type locality is 5 km west of the Hattah-Kulkyne National Park.

== Behaviour ==
Flowering plants visited by the bees include Eremophila deserti.
