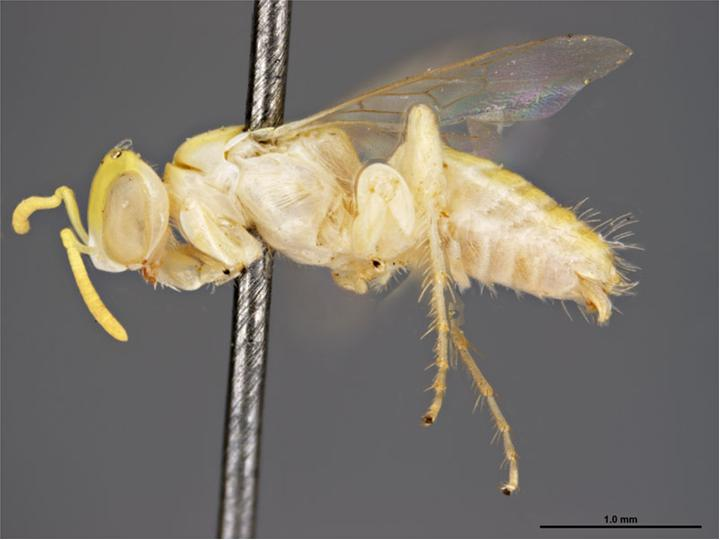
- Male

Scientific classification
- Kingdom: Animalia
- Phylum: Arthropoda
- Clade: Pancrustacea
- Class: Insecta
- Order: Hymenoptera
- Family: Colletidae
- Genus: Brachyhesma
- Species: B. grossopedalis

Binomial name
- Brachyhesma grossopedalis Exley, 1977

= Brachyhesma grossopedalis =

Species of bee

Brachyhesma grossopedalis, or Brachyhesma (Brachyhesma) grossopedalis, is a species of bee in the family Colletidae and the subfamily Euryglossinae. It is endemic to Australia. It was described in 1977 by Australian entomologist Elizabeth Exley.

== Distribution and habitat ==
The species occurs in the Mid West region of Western Australia. The type locality is 12 km north of the Murchison River crossing on the North West Coastal Highway. It has also been recorded from Wannoo, via Carnarvon.

== Behaviour ==
The adults are flying mellivores. Flowering plants visited by the bees include Eucalyptus species.
