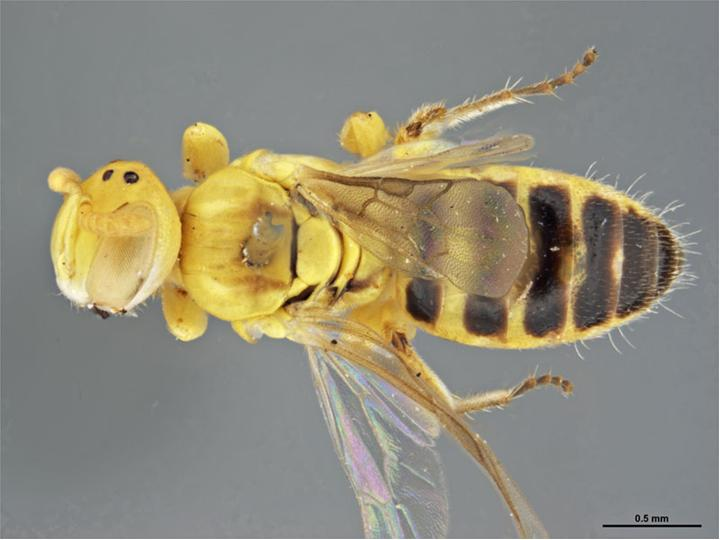
- Male

Scientific classification
- Kingdom: Animalia
- Phylum: Arthropoda
- Clade: Pancrustacea
- Class: Insecta
- Order: Hymenoptera
- Family: Colletidae
- Genus: Brachyhesma
- Species: B. katherinensis

Binomial name
- Brachyhesma katherinensis Exley, 1974

= Brachyhesma katherinensis =

Species of bee

Brachyhesma katherinensis, or Brachyhesma (Microhesma) katherinensis, is a species of bee in the family Colletidae and the subfamily Euryglossinae. It is endemic to Australia. It was described in 1974 by Australian entomologist Elizabeth Exley.

== Distribution and habitat ==
The species occurs in tropical northern Australia. The type locality is 24 km east of Katherine in the Northern Territory.

== Behaviour ==
The adults are flying mellivores. Flowering plants visited by the bees include Eucalyptus species.
