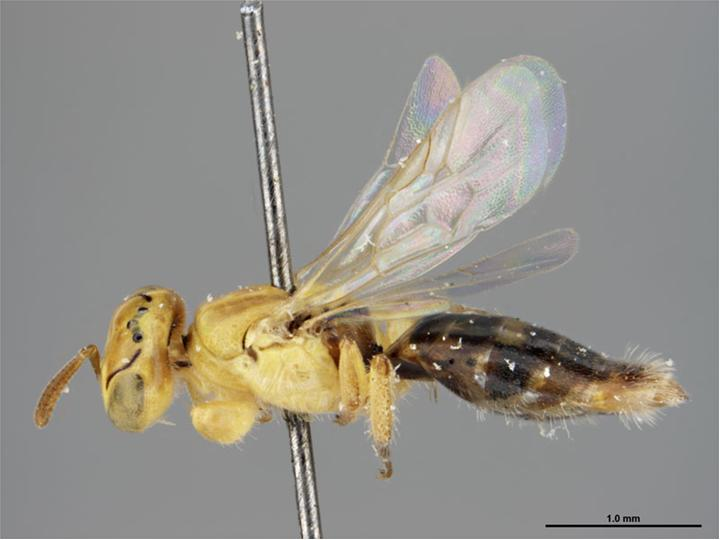
- Male

Scientific classification
- Kingdom: Animalia
- Phylum: Arthropoda
- Clade: Pancrustacea
- Class: Insecta
- Order: Hymenoptera
- Family: Colletidae
- Genus: Brachyhesma
- Species: B. ventralis

Binomial name
- Brachyhesma ventralis Exley, 1977

= Brachyhesma ventralis =

Species of bee

Brachyhesma ventralis, or Brachyhesma (Microhesma) ventralis, is a species of bee in the family Colletidae and the subfamily Euryglossinae. It is endemic to Australia. It was described in 1977 by Australian entomologist Elizabeth Exley.

== Distribution and habitat ==
The species occurs in eastern Australia. The type locality is 32 km west of Tenterfield in the Northern Tablelands of New South Wales. It has also been recorded from Slacks Creek, Queensland.

== Behaviour ==
The adults are flying mellivores. Flowering plants visited by the bees include Angophora and Melaleuca species.
