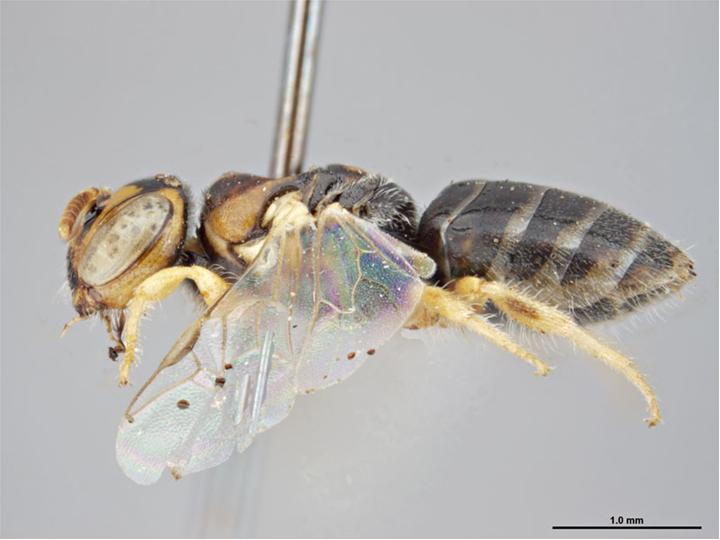
- Female

Scientific classification
- Kingdom: Animalia
- Phylum: Arthropoda
- Clade: Pancrustacea
- Class: Insecta
- Order: Hymenoptera
- Family: Colletidae
- Genus: Euryglossula
- Species: E. variepicta

Binomial name
- Euryglossula variepicta Exley, 1969

= Euryglossula variepicta =

Species of bee

Euryglossula variepicta is a species of bee in the family Colletidae and the subfamily Euryglossinae. It is endemic to Australia. It was described in 1969 by Australian entomologist Elizabeth Exley.

== Distribution and habitat ==
The species occurs in both eastern and western Australia. The type locality is Blackall in Central West Queensland. It has also been recorded from the Pilbara region.

== Behaviour ==
The adults are flying mellivores. Flowering plants visited by the bees include Bauhinia and Eremophila species.
