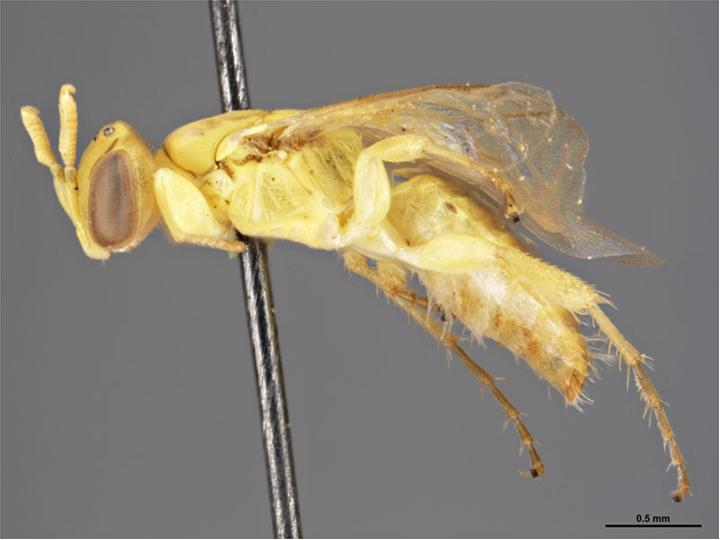
- Male

Scientific classification
- Kingdom: Animalia
- Phylum: Arthropoda
- Clade: Pancrustacea
- Class: Insecta
- Order: Hymenoptera
- Family: Colletidae
- Genus: Brachyhesma
- Species: B. healesvillensis

Binomial name
- Brachyhesma healesvillensis Exley, 1968

= Brachyhesma healesvillensis =

Species of bee

Brachyhesma healesvillensis, or Brachyhesma (Microhesma) healesvillensis, is a species of bee in the family Colletidae and the subfamily Euryglossinae. It is endemic to Australia. It was described in 1968 by Australian entomologist Elizabeth Exley.

== Distribution and habitat ==
The species occurs in south-eastern Australia. The type locality is Mount Yule, Healesville, Victoria. It has also been recorded from Singleton, New South Wales.

== Behaviour ==
The adults are flying mellivores. Flowering plants visited by the bees include Angophora and Eucalyptus species.
