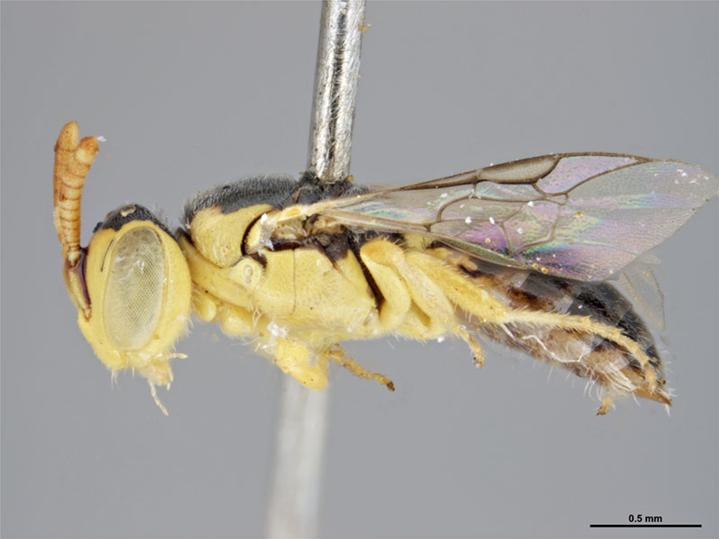
- Male

Scientific classification
- Kingdom: Animalia
- Phylum: Arthropoda
- Clade: Pancrustacea
- Class: Insecta
- Order: Hymenoptera
- Family: Colletidae
- Genus: Euryglossula
- Species: E. deserti

Binomial name
- Euryglossula deserti Exley, 1968

= Euryglossula deserti =

Species of bee

Euryglossula deserti is a species of bee in the family Colletidae and the subfamily Euryglossinae. It is endemic to Australia. It was described in 1968 by Australian entomologist Elizabeth Exley.

== Distribution and habitat ==
The species occurs in central Australia. The type locality is MacDonald Downs Station, some 200 km north-east of Alice Springs in the south of the Northern Territory.

== Behaviour ==
The adults are flying mellivores.

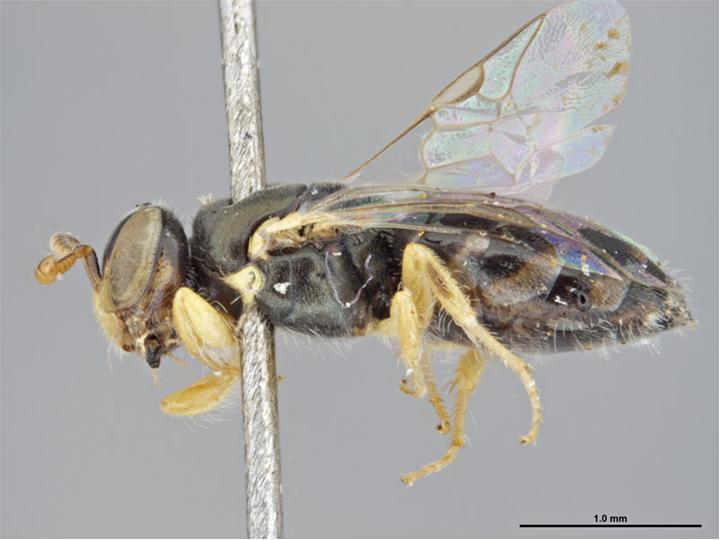
Female
