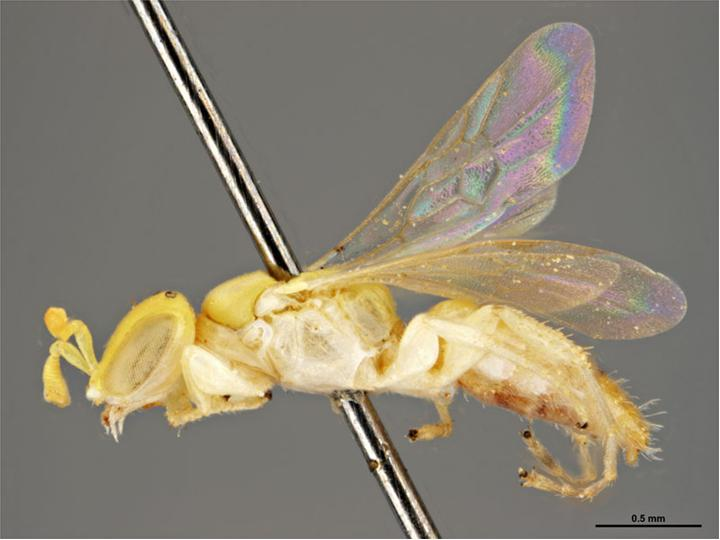
- Male

Scientific classification
- Kingdom: Animalia
- Phylum: Arthropoda
- Clade: Pancrustacea
- Class: Insecta
- Order: Hymenoptera
- Family: Colletidae
- Genus: Brachyhesma
- Species: B. trichopterota

Binomial name
- Brachyhesma trichopterota Exley, 1968

= Brachyhesma trichopterota =

Species of bee

Brachyhesma trichopterota, or Brachyhesma (Microhesma) trichopterota, is a species of bee in the family Colletidae and the subfamily Euryglossinae. It is endemic to Australia. It was described in 1968 by Australian entomologist Elizabeth Exley.

== Etymology ==
The specific epithet trichopterota is an anatomical reference to the dense macrotrichia on the forewings.

== Description ==
Colouration is mainly yellow, with brown markings. Males: body length 3.0 mm, wing length 1.8 mm; females: body length 3.1 mm, wing length 2 mm.

== Distribution and habitat ==
The species occurs in tropical northern Queensland. The type locality is Mount Isa. It has also been recorded from Georgetown.

== Behaviour ==
The adults are flying mellivores. Flowering plants visited by the bees include Eucalyptus species.
