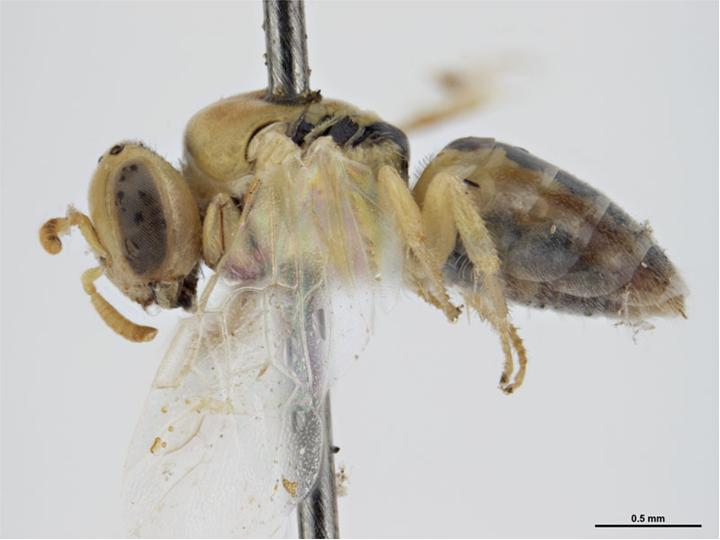
- Male

Scientific classification
- Kingdom: Animalia
- Phylum: Arthropoda
- Clade: Pancrustacea
- Class: Insecta
- Order: Hymenoptera
- Family: Colletidae
- Genus: Euryglossula
- Species: E. flava

Binomial name
- Euryglossula flava Exley, 1968

= Euryglossula flava =

Species of bee

Euryglossula flava is a species of bee in the family Colletidae and the subfamily Euryglossinae. It is endemic to Australia. It was described in 1968 by Australian entomologist Elizabeth Exley.

== Distribution and habitat ==
The species occurs on the Barkly Tableland of northern inland Australia. The type locality is 22 km north of Barrow Creek in the Northern Territory. It has also been recorded from the vicinity of Cloncurry in north-western Queensland.

== Behaviour ==
The adults are flying mellivores. Flowering plants visited by the bees include Eucalyptus species.

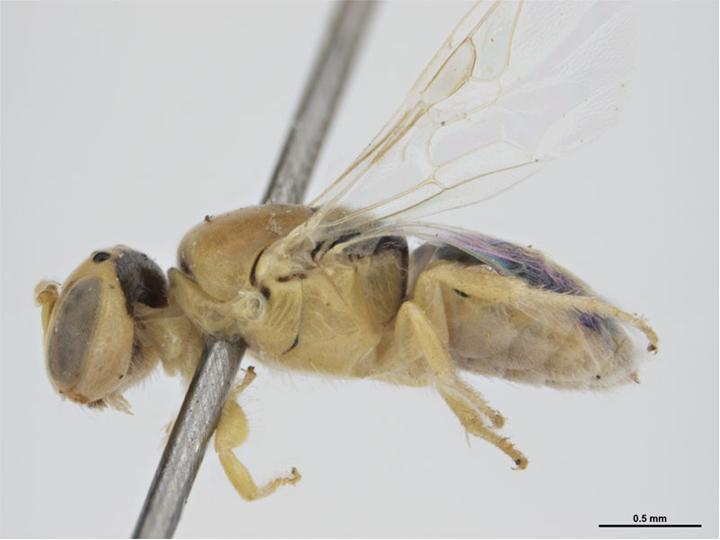
Female
