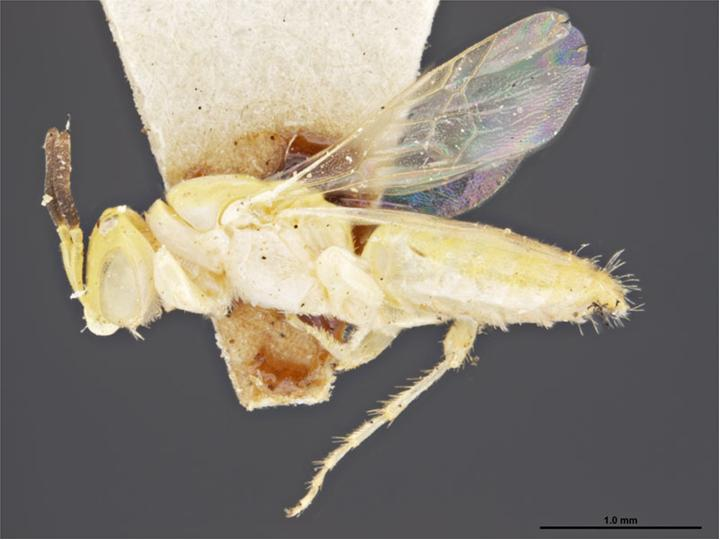
- Male

Scientific classification
- Kingdom: Animalia
- Phylum: Arthropoda
- Clade: Pancrustacea
- Class: Insecta
- Order: Hymenoptera
- Family: Colletidae
- Genus: Brachyhesma
- Species: B. nigricornis

Binomial name
- Brachyhesma nigricornis Exley, 1975

= Brachyhesma nigricornis =

Species of bee

Brachyhesma nigricornis, or Brachyhesma (Brachyhesma) nigricornis, is a species of bee in the family Colletidae and the subfamily Euryglossinae. It is endemic to Australia. It was described in 1975 by Australian entomologist Elizabeth Exley.

== Etymology ==
The specific epithet nigricornis refers to the black antennal flagella of the male.

== Description ==
Colouring is mainly yellow. Body length of males is 3.5 mm, wing length 2.1 mm; body length of females is 3.5 mm, wing length 2.4 mm.

== Distribution and habitat ==
The type locality is Billiatt Conservation Park in South Australia. It has also been recorded from Mataranka, Northern Territory.

== Behaviour ==
The adults are flying mellivores. Flowering plants visited by the bees include mallee eucalypts.
