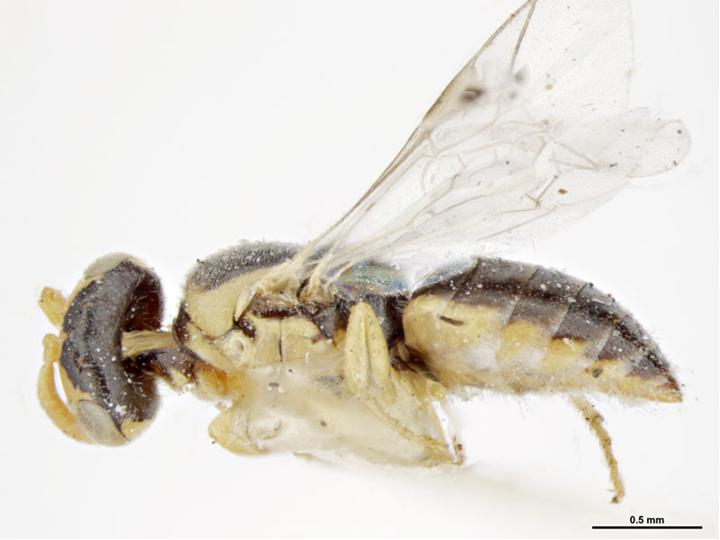
- Male

Scientific classification
- Kingdom: Animalia
- Phylum: Arthropoda
- Clade: Pancrustacea
- Class: Insecta
- Order: Hymenoptera
- Family: Colletidae
- Genus: Euryglossula
- Species: E. carnarvonensis

Binomial name
- Euryglossula carnarvonensis Exley, 1968

= Euryglossula carnarvonensis =

Species of bee

Euryglossula carnarvonensis is a species of bee in the family Colletidae and the subfamily Euryglossinae. It is endemic to Australia. It was described in 1968 by Australian entomologist Elizabeth Exley.

== Distribution and habitat ==
The species occurs in the Gascoyne region of Western Australia. The type locality is Carnarvon.

== Behaviour ==
The adults are flying mellivores.

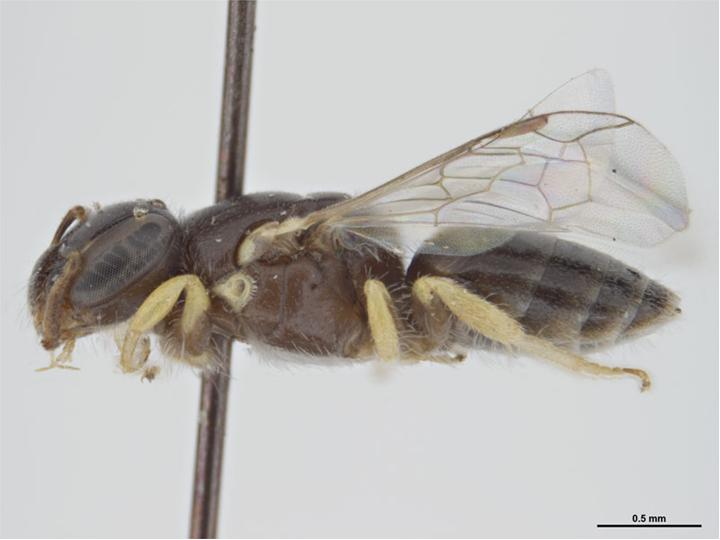
Female
