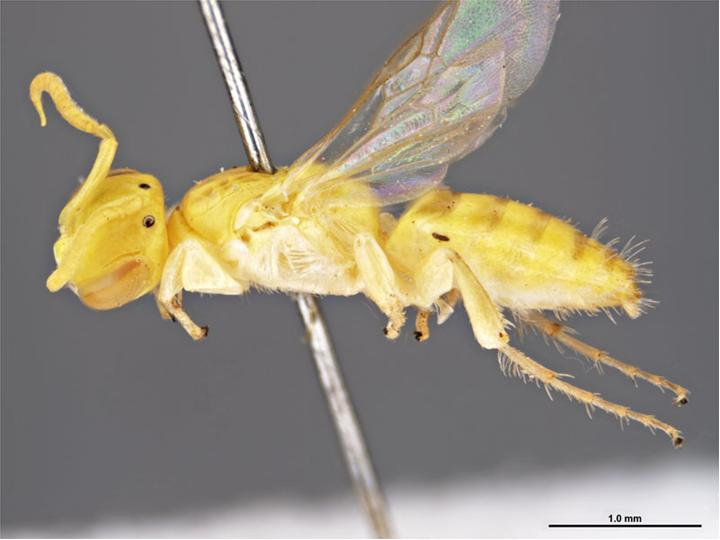
- Male

Scientific classification
- Kingdom: Animalia
- Phylum: Arthropoda
- Clade: Pancrustacea
- Class: Insecta
- Order: Hymenoptera
- Family: Colletidae
- Genus: Brachyhesma
- Species: B. antennata

Binomial name
- Brachyhesma antennata Exley, 1977

= Brachyhesma antennata =

Species of bee

Brachyhesma antennata, or Brachyhesma (Brachyhesma) antennata, is a species of bee in the family Colletidae and the subfamily Euryglossinae. It is endemic to Australia. It was described in 1977 by Australian entomologist Elizabeth Exley.

== Distribution and habitat ==
The species occurs in the Pilbara region of Western Australia. The type locality is 9 km north of the Newman turnoff on the Great Northern Highway. It has also been recorded from Millstream Station, now part of the Millstream Chichester National Park.

== Behaviour ==
The adults are flying mellivores. Flowering plants visited by the bees include Eucalyptus species.
