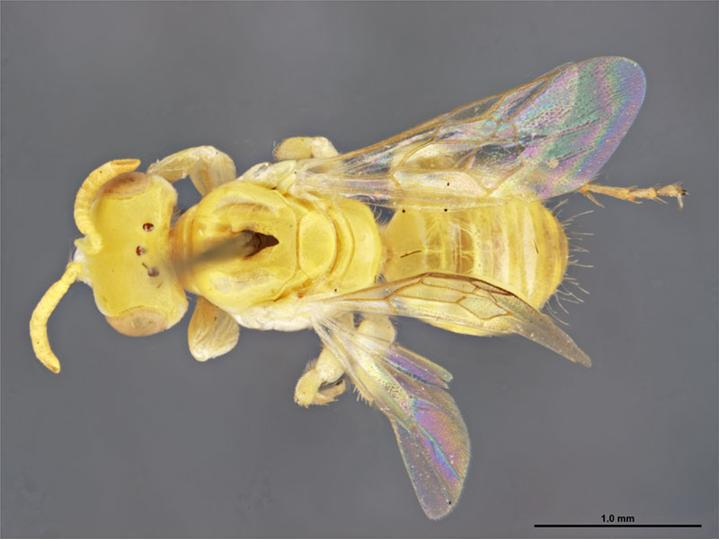
- Male

Scientific classification
- Kingdom: Animalia
- Phylum: Arthropoda
- Clade: Pancrustacea
- Class: Insecta
- Order: Hymenoptera
- Family: Colletidae
- Genus: Brachyhesma
- Species: B. wyndhami

Binomial name
- Brachyhesma wyndhami Exley, 1968

= Brachyhesma wyndhami =

Species of bee

Brachyhesma wyndhami, or Brachyhesma (Brachyhesma) wyndhami, is a species of bee in the family Colletidae and the subfamily Euryglossinae. It is endemic to Australia. It was described in 1968 by Australian entomologist Elizabeth Exley.

== Distribution and habitat ==
The species occurs in northern Western Australia. The type locality is the Kimberley Research Station, Wyndham. Other published localities include Newman and Carnarvon.

== Behaviour ==
The adults are flying mellivores. Flowering plants visited by the bees include Eucalyptus species.
