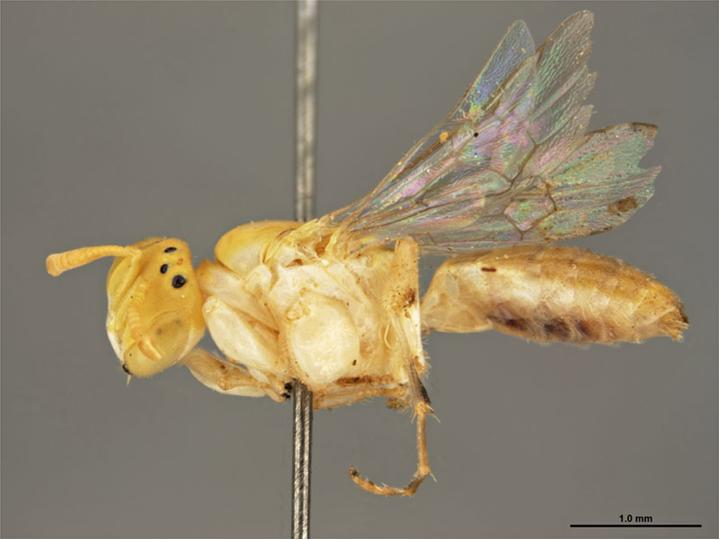
- Male

Scientific classification
- Kingdom: Animalia
- Phylum: Arthropoda
- Clade: Pancrustacea
- Class: Insecta
- Order: Hymenoptera
- Family: Colletidae
- Genus: Brachyhesma
- Species: B. morvenensis

Binomial name
- Brachyhesma morvenensis Exley, 1974

= Brachyhesma morvenensis =

Species of bee

Brachyhesma morvenensis, or Brachyhesma (Brachyhesma) morvenensis, is a species of bee in the family Colletidae and the subfamily Euryglossinae. It is endemic to Australia. It was described in 1974 by Australian entomologist Elizabeth Exley.

== Distribution and habitat ==
The species occurs in southern inland Queensland. The type locality is 11 km west of Charleville. As well as the vicinity of Charleville, it has also been recorded from Morven.

== Behaviour ==
The adults are flying mellivores. Flowering plants visited by the bees include Eucalyptus species.
