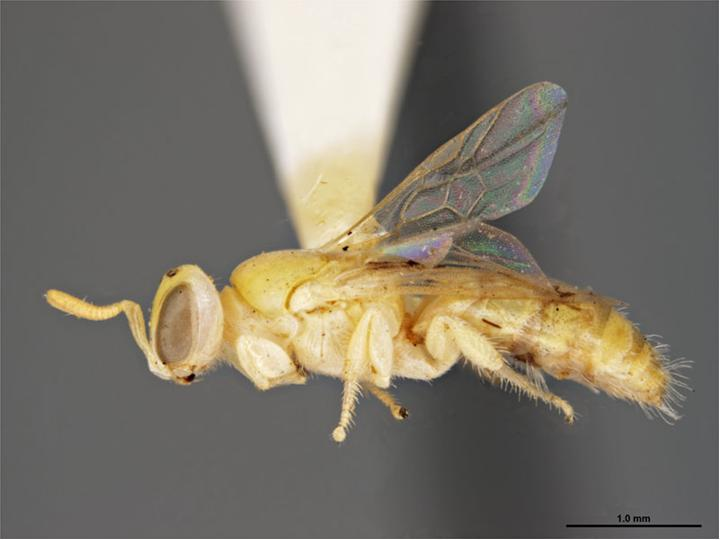
- Male

Scientific classification
- Kingdom: Animalia
- Phylum: Arthropoda
- Clade: Pancrustacea
- Class: Insecta
- Order: Hymenoptera
- Family: Colletidae
- Genus: Brachyhesma
- Species: B. renneri

Binomial name
- Brachyhesma renneri Exley, 1968

= Brachyhesma renneri =

Species of bee

Brachyhesma renneri, or Brachyhesma (Brachyhesma) renneri, is a species of bee in the family Colletidae and the subfamily Euryglossinae. It is endemic to Australia. It was described in 1968 by Australian entomologist Elizabeth Exley.

== Distribution and habitat ==
The species occurs in the Northern Territory. The type locality is 37 km north of Renner Springs on the Barkly Tableland.

== Behaviour ==
The adults are flying mellivores. Flowering plants visited by the bees include Eucalyptus species.
