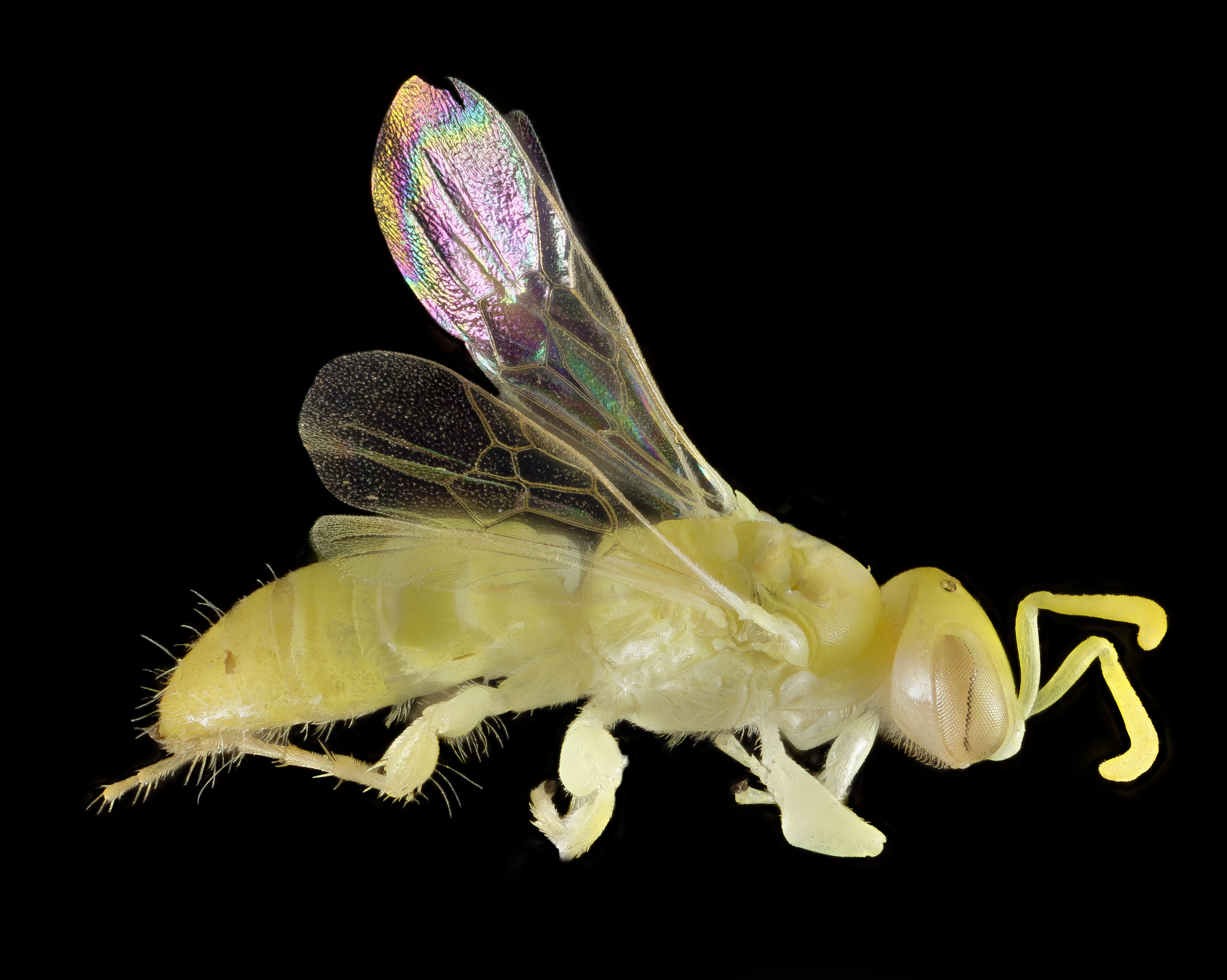
- Brachyhesma sulphurella

Scientific classification
- Kingdom: Animalia
- Phylum: Arthropoda
- Clade: Pancrustacea
- Class: Insecta
- Order: Hymenoptera
- Superfamily: Apoidea
- Clade: Anthophila
- Family: Colletidae
- Subfamily: Euryglossinae
- Genus: Brachyhesma; Michener, 1965

= Brachyhesma =

Genus of bees

Brachyhesma is a genus of bees in the family Colletidae and the subfamily Euryglossinae. It is endemic to Australia. It was described in 1965 by American entomologist Charles Duncan Michener, and extensively reviewed and revised in 1977 by Australian entomologist Elizabeth Exley.

== Subgenera ==
There are four subgenera:

- Brachyhesma (Anomalohesma) Exley, 1977
- Brachyhesma (Brachyhesma) Michener, 1965
- Brachyhesma (Henicohesma) Exley, 1968
- Brachyhesma (Microhesma) Michener, 1965

== Species ==
As of 2026 the genus contained 41 valid species:

- Brachyhesma angularis Exley, 1977
- Brachyhesma antennata Exley, 1977
- Brachyhesma apicalis Exley, 1969
- Brachyhesma aurata Exley, 1977
- Brachyhesma barrowensis Exley, 1968
- Brachyhesma bitrichopedalis Exley, 1968
- Brachyhesma carnarvonensis Exley, 1977
- Brachyhesma cavagnari Exley, 1968
- Brachyhesma cooki Michener, 1965
- Brachyhesma dedari Exley, 1968
- Brachyhesma deserticola Exley, 1968
- Brachyhesma femoralis Exley, 1977
- Brachyhesma grossopedalis Exley, 1977
- Brachyhesma healesvillensis Exley, 1968
- Brachyhesma houstoni Exley, 1968
- Brachyhesma hypoxantha (Rayment, 1934)
- Brachyhesma incompleta Michener, 1965
- Brachyhesma isae Exley, 1977
- Brachyhesma josephinae Exley, 1968
- Brachyhesma katherinensis Exley, 1974
- Brachyhesma longicornis Exley, 1968
- Brachyhesma macdonaldensis Exley, 1968
- Brachyhesma matarankae Exley, 1977
- Brachyhesma microxantha (Cockerell, 1914)
- Brachyhesma minya Exley, 1975
- Brachyhesma monteithae Exley, 1975
- Brachyhesma morvenensis Exley, 1974
- Brachyhesma nabarleki Exley, 1977
- Brachyhesma newmanensis Exley, 1977
- Brachyhesma nigricornis Exley, 1975
- Brachyhesma paucivenata Exley, 1977
- Brachyhesma perlutea (Cockerell, 1916)
- Brachyhesma renneri Exley, 1968
- Brachyhesma rossi Exley, 1968
- Brachyhesma scapata Exley, 1977
- Brachyhesma storeyi Exley, 1977
- Brachyhesma sulphurella (Cockerell, 1913)
- Brachyhesma triangularis Exley, 1977
- Brachyhesma trichopterota Exley, 1968
- Brachyhesma ventralis Exley, 1977
- Brachyhesma wyndhami Exley, 1968
