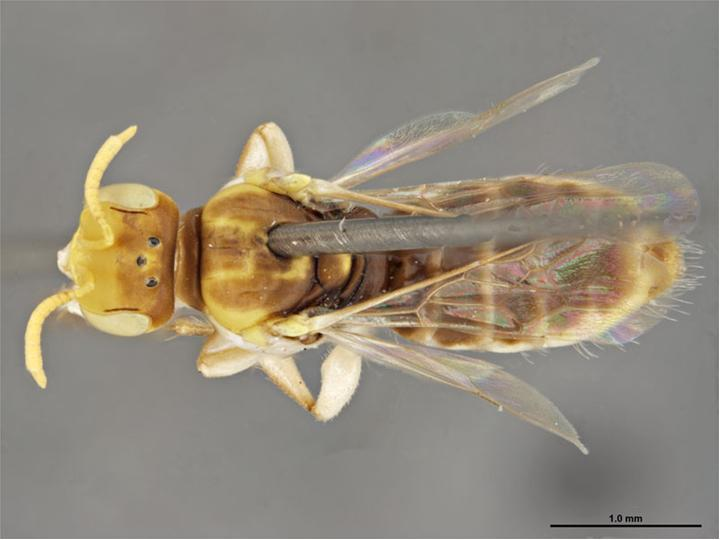
- Male

Scientific classification
- Kingdom: Animalia
- Phylum: Arthropoda
- Clade: Pancrustacea
- Class: Insecta
- Order: Hymenoptera
- Family: Colletidae
- Genus: Brachyhesma
- Species: B. houstoni

Binomial name
- Brachyhesma houstoni Exley, 1968

= Brachyhesma houstoni =

Species of bee

Brachyhesma houstoni, or Brachyhesma (Brachyhesma) houstoni, is a species of bee in the family Colletidae and the subfamily Euryglossinae. It is endemic to Australia. It was described in 1968 by Australian entomologist Elizabeth Exley.

== Etymology ==
The specific epithet houstoni honours Mr T. Houston who collected the type specimens.

== Description ==
Colouration is yellow with brown markings. Males: body length 4.1 mm, wing length 2.6 mm; females: body length 3.9 mm, wing length 2.5 mm.

== Distribution and habitat ==
The species occurs in South Australia. The type locality is Kongal, near Bordertown.

== Behaviour ==
The adults are flying mellivores.
