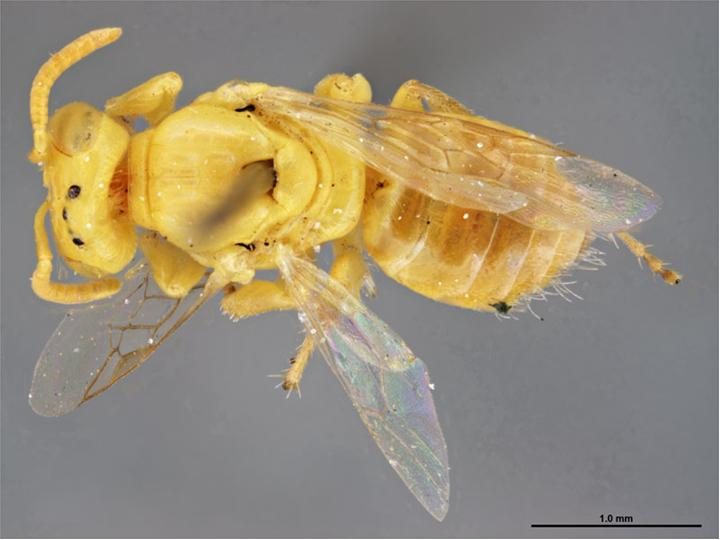
- Male

Scientific classification
- Kingdom: Animalia
- Phylum: Arthropoda
- Clade: Pancrustacea
- Class: Insecta
- Order: Hymenoptera
- Family: Colletidae
- Genus: Brachyhesma
- Species: B. angularis

Binomial name
- Brachyhesma angularis Exley, 1977

= Brachyhesma angularis =

Species of bee

Brachyhesma angularis, or Brachyhesma (Brachyhesma) angularis, is a species of bee in the family Colletidae and the subfamily Euryglossinae. It is endemic to Australia. It was described in 1977 by Australian entomologist Elizabeth Exley.

== Distribution and habitat ==
The type locality is Tennant Creek on the Barkly Tableland of the Northern Territory.

== Behaviour ==
The adults are flying mellivores. Flowering plants visited by the bees include Eucalyptus species.
