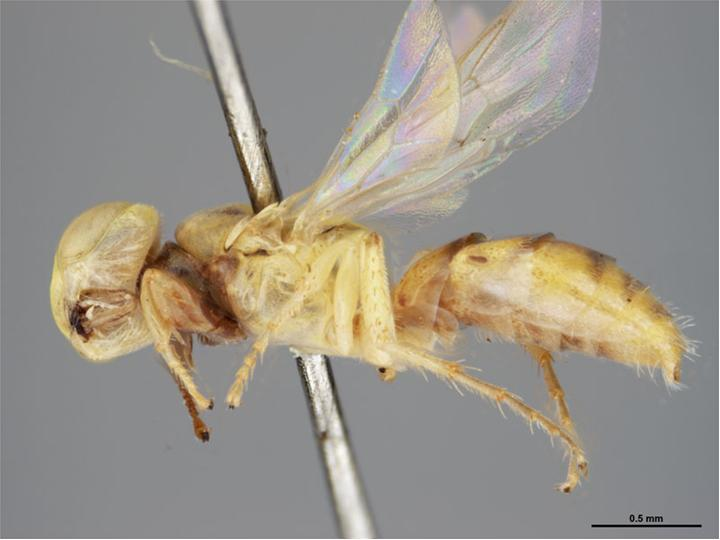
- Male

Scientific classification
- Kingdom: Animalia
- Phylum: Arthropoda
- Clade: Pancrustacea
- Class: Insecta
- Order: Hymenoptera
- Family: Colletidae
- Genus: Brachyhesma
- Species: B. newmanensis

Binomial name
- Brachyhesma newmanensis Exley, 1977

= Brachyhesma newmanensis =

Species of bee

Brachyhesma newmanensis, or Brachyhesma (Microhesma) newmanensis, is a species of bee in the family Colletidae and the subfamily Euryglossinae. It is endemic to Australia. It was described in 1977 by Australian entomologist Elizabeth Exley.

== Distribution and habitat ==
The species occurs in the Pilbara region of Western Australia. The type locality is 9 km north of the Newman turnoff on the Great Northern Highway.

== Behaviour ==
The adults are flying mellivores. Flowering plants visited by the bees include Eucalyptus species.
