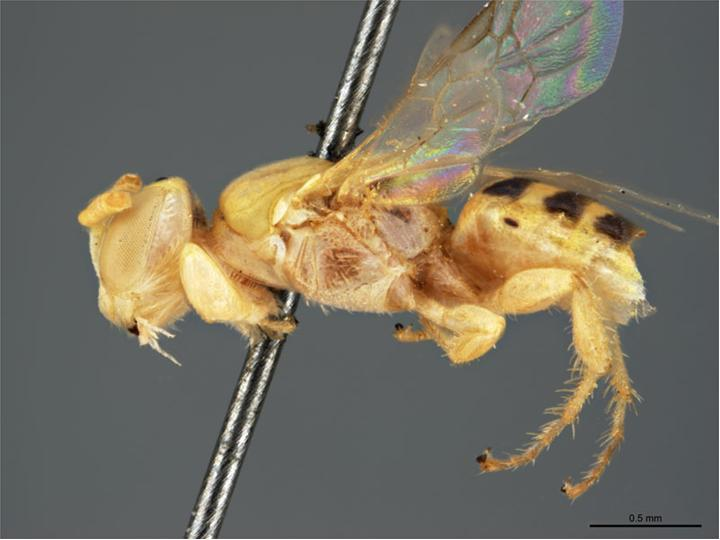
- Male

Scientific classification
- Kingdom: Animalia
- Phylum: Arthropoda
- Clade: Pancrustacea
- Class: Insecta
- Order: Hymenoptera
- Family: Colletidae
- Genus: Brachyhesma
- Species: B. nabarleki

Binomial name
- Brachyhesma nabarleki Exley, 1977

= Brachyhesma nabarleki =

Species of bee

Brachyhesma nabarleki, or Brachyhesma (Microhesma) nabarleki, is a species of bee in the family Colletidae and the subfamily Euryglossinae. It is endemic to Australia. It was described in 1977 by Australian entomologist Elizabeth Exley.

== Distribution and habitat ==
The species occurs in the Top End of the Northern Territory. The type locality is Nabarlek Dam, 14 km south-south-west of Nimbuwah Rock near the Western Arnhem Land escarpment. Other published localities include Magela Creek, Oenpelli, Elizabeth River and Katherine.

== Behaviour ==
The adults are flying mellivores. Flowering plants visited by the bees include Eucalyptus and Eugenia species.
