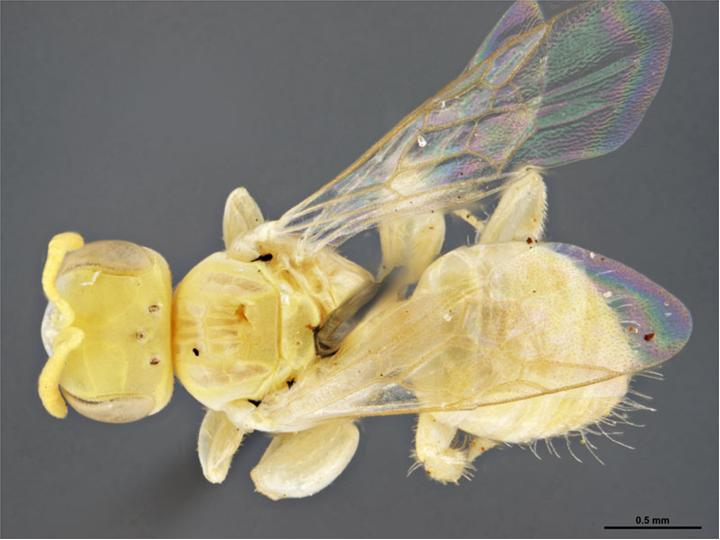
- Male

Scientific classification
- Kingdom: Animalia
- Phylum: Arthropoda
- Clade: Pancrustacea
- Class: Insecta
- Order: Hymenoptera
- Family: Colletidae
- Genus: Brachyhesma
- Species: B. femoralis

Binomial name
- Brachyhesma femoralis Exley, 1977

= Brachyhesma femoralis =

Species of bee

Brachyhesma femoralis, or Brachyhesma (Brachyhesma) femoralis, is a species of bee in the family Colletidae and the subfamily Euryglossinae. It is endemic to Australia. It was described in 1977 by Australian entomologist Elizabeth Exley.

== Distribution and habitat ==
The species occurs in the Wheatbelt and Mid West regions of Western Australia. The type locality is 18 km south of Cataby via Dandaragan. It has also been recorded from Dongara.

== Behaviour ==
The adults are flying mellivores. Flowering plants visited by the bees include Eucalyptus species.
