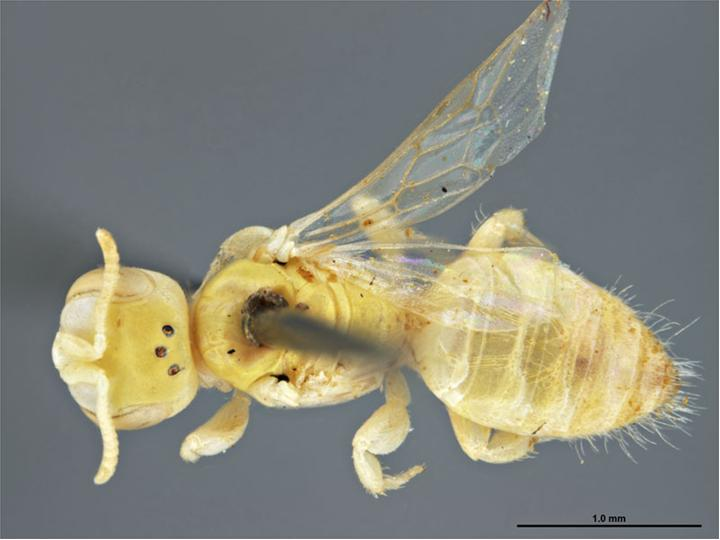
- Male

Scientific classification
- Kingdom: Animalia
- Phylum: Arthropoda
- Clade: Pancrustacea
- Class: Insecta
- Order: Hymenoptera
- Family: Colletidae
- Genus: Brachyhesma
- Species: B. scapata

Binomial name
- Brachyhesma scapata Exley, 1977

= Brachyhesma scapata =

Species of bee

Brachyhesma scapata, or Brachyhesma (Anomalohesma) scapata, is a species of bee in the family Colletidae and the subfamily Euryglossinae. It is endemic to Australia. It was described in 1977 by Australian entomologist Elizabeth Exley.

== Distribution and habitat ==
The species occurs in south-east Queensland. The type locality is Rainbow Beach Road, some 48 km north-east of Gympie.

== Behaviour ==
The adults are flying mellivores. Flowering plants visited by the bees include Eucalyptus species.
