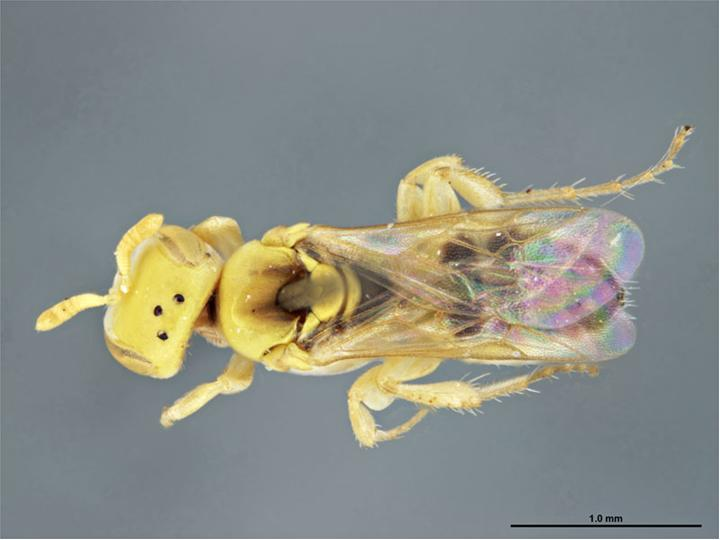
- Male

Scientific classification
- Kingdom: Animalia
- Phylum: Arthropoda
- Clade: Pancrustacea
- Class: Insecta
- Order: Hymenoptera
- Family: Colletidae
- Genus: Brachyhesma
- Species: B. paucivenata

Binomial name
- Brachyhesma paucivenata Exley, 1977

= Brachyhesma paucivenata =

Species of bee

Brachyhesma paucivenata, or Brachyhesma (Microhesma) paucivenata, is a species of bee in the family Colletidae and the subfamily Euryglossinae. It is endemic to Australia. It was described in 1977 by Australian entomologist Elizabeth Exley.

== Distribution and habitat ==
The species occurs across tropical northern Australia. The type locality is 12 km south-west of Katherine in the Northern Territory.

== Behaviour ==
The adults are flying mellivores. Flowering plants visited by the bees include Eucalyptus species.
