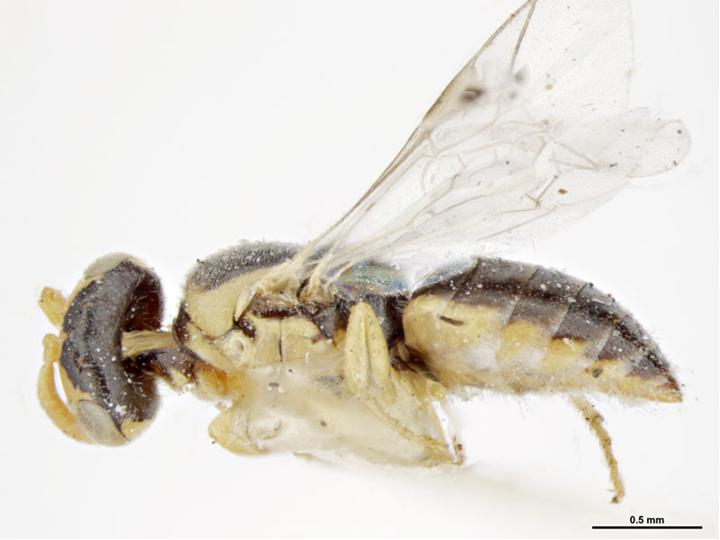
- Euryglossula carnarvonensis, male

Scientific classification
- Kingdom: Animalia
- Phylum: Arthropoda
- Clade: Pancrustacea
- Class: Insecta
- Order: Hymenoptera
- Superfamily: Apoidea
- Clade: Anthophila
- Family: Colletidae
- Subfamily: Euryglossinae
- Genus: Euryglossula; Michener, 1965

= Euryglossula =

Genus of bees

Euryglossula is a genus of bees in the family Colletidae and the subfamily Euryglossinae. It is endemic to Australia. It was described in 1965 by American entomologist Charles Duncan Michener.

== Species ==
As of 2026 the genus contained 18 valid species:

- Euryglossula aeneoceps Batley, 2016
- Euryglossula carnarvonensis Exley, 1968
- Euryglossula chalcosoma (Cockerell, 1913)
- Euryglossula deserti Exley, 1968
- Euryglossula elizabethae Batley, 2016
- Euryglossula eremophilae Batley, 2016
- Euryglossula flava Exley, 1968
- Euryglossula fultoni (Cockerell, 1913)
- Euryglossula incisa Batley, 2016
- Euryglossula kubinensis Batley, 2016
- Euryglossula laticeps Batley, 2016
- Euryglossula microdonta (Rayment, 1934)
- Euryglossula pallida Batley, 2016
- Euryglossula pinnulata Batley, 2016
- Euryglossula purpurea Batley, 2016
- Euryglossula scalaris Batley, 2016
- Euryglossula storeyi Batley, 2016
- Euryglossula variepicta Exley, 1969
