= Euryglossula aeneoceps =

Scientific classification
- Kingdom: Animalia
- Phylum: Arthropoda
- Clade: Pancrustacea
- Class: Insecta
- Order: Hymenoptera
- Family: Colletidae
- Genus: Euryglossula
- Species: E. aeneoceps

Binomial name
- Euryglossula aeneoceps Batley, 2016

Species of bee

Euryglossula aeneoceps is a species of bee in the family Colletidae and the subfamily Euryglossinae. It is endemic to Australia. It was described in 2016 by Australian entomologist Michael Batley.

== Etymology ==
The specific epithet aeneoceps is Latin for "bronze-headed".

== Description ==
Body length of females is 3.0 mm, that of males 2.5 mm.

== Distribution and habitat ==
The species occurs in northern Australia. The type locality is Cooper Creek, 19 km east by south of Mount Borradale in the Top End of the Northern Territory. It has also been recorded from the Napier Range and King Leopold Ranges in the Kimberley region of Western Australia.

== Behaviour ==
Flowering plants visited by the bees include Eucalyptus species.
