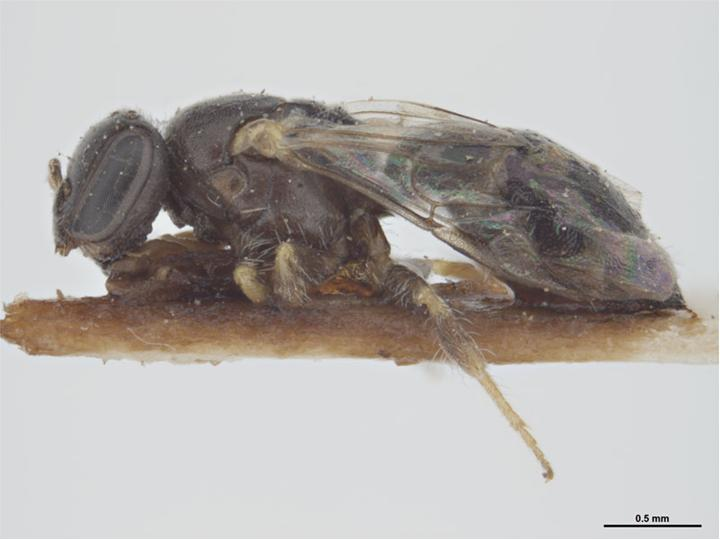
- Female

Scientific classification
- Kingdom: Animalia
- Phylum: Arthropoda
- Clade: Pancrustacea
- Class: Insecta
- Order: Hymenoptera
- Family: Colletidae
- Genus: Euryglossula
- Species: E. microdonta

Binomial name
- Euryglossula microdonta (Rayment, 1934)

Synonyms
- Euryglossina microdonta Rayment, 1934; Euryglossina parazantha Rayment, 1934

= Euryglossula microdonta =

Species of bee

Euryglossula microdonta is a species of bee in the family Colletidae and the subfamily Euryglossinae. It is endemic to Australia. It was described in 1934 by Australian entomologist Tarlton Rayment.

== Distribution and habitat ==
The species occurs in southern and western Australia. The type locality is Rottnest Island, Western Australia. Other published localities include Wallaroo, Tintinara and Keith in South Australia.

== Behaviour ==
The adults are flying mellivores. Flowering plants visited by the bees include Eucalyptus and Leptospermum species.

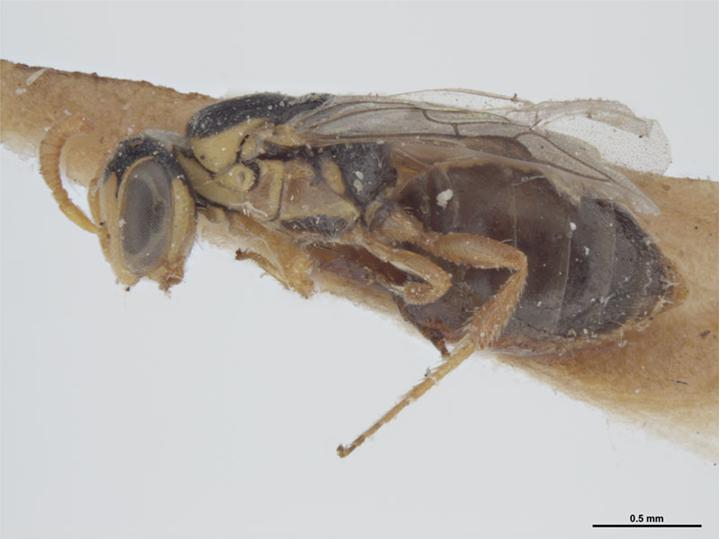
Male
