= Euryglossula scalaris =

Scientific classification
- Kingdom: Animalia
- Phylum: Arthropoda
- Clade: Pancrustacea
- Class: Insecta
- Order: Hymenoptera
- Family: Colletidae
- Genus: Euryglossula
- Species: E. scalaris

Binomial name
- Euryglossula scalaris Batley, 2016

Species of bee

Euryglossula scalaris is a species of bee in the family Colletidae and the subfamily Euryglossinae. It is endemic to Australia. It was described in 2016 by Australian entomologist Michael Batley.

== Etymology ==
The specific epithet scalaris (Latin: "of a ladder") refers to the colour pattern on the dorsal metasoma.

== Description ==
Body length of females is 3.5 mm, that of males 3.5 mm; head width of females is 1.1 mm, males 1.1 mm. The metasoma is distinctive in both sexes, being "yellow with thick black lines running down the sides and across the rear of each tergum to form a linear pattern of contiguous rectangles".

== Distribution and habitat ==
The species occurs in north central Australia. The type locality is 6 km north-east of the Barkly Roadhouse in the Northern Territory. It has also been recorded from a site 10 km east of Camooweal in north-western Queensland, as well as from 170 km east of Broome in Western Australia.

== Behaviour ==
Flowering plants visited by the bees include Corymbia terminalis and Eucalyptus species.
