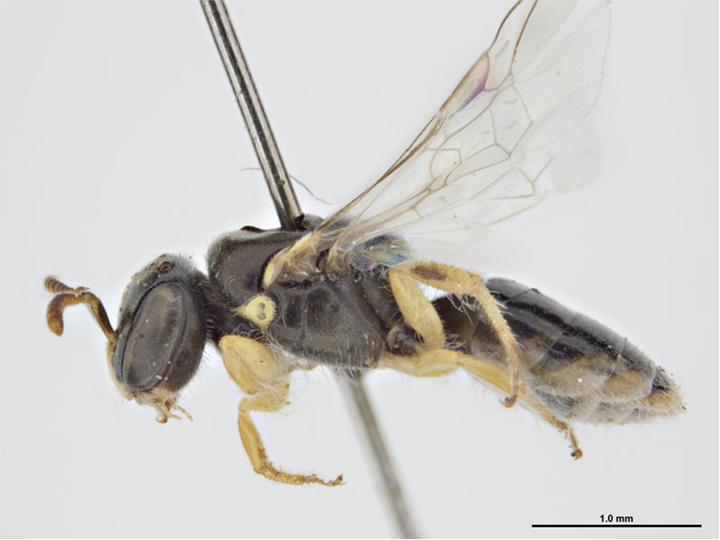
- Female

Scientific classification
- Kingdom: Animalia
- Phylum: Arthropoda
- Clade: Pancrustacea
- Class: Insecta
- Order: Hymenoptera
- Family: Colletidae
- Genus: Euryglossula
- Species: E. chalcosoma

Binomial name
- Euryglossula chalcosoma (Cockerell, 1913)

Synonyms
- Euryglossina chalcosoma Cockerell, 1913; Euryglossina chalcosoma claristigma Rayment, 1935

= Euryglossula chalcosoma =

Species of bee

Euryglossula chalcosoma is a species of bee in the family Colletidae and the subfamily Euryglossinae. It is endemic to Australia. It was described in 1913 by British-American entomologist Theodore Dru Alison Cockerell.

== Distribution and habitat ==
The species occurs in eastern Australia. Type localities are Croydon and Sandringham in Victoria.

== Behaviour ==
The adults are solitary flying mellivores, with sedentary larvae, that nest in soil in aggregations. Flowering plants visited by the bees include Angophora, Callistemon, Eucalyptus, Jacksonia, Leptospermum and Melaleuca species.

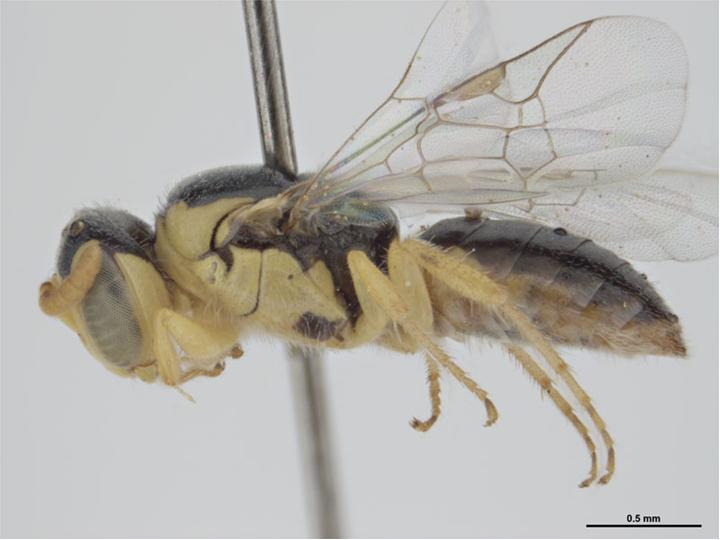
Male
