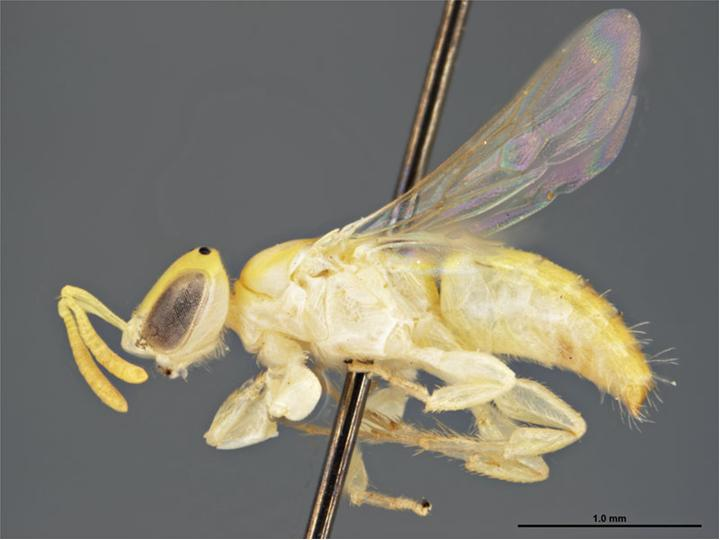
- Male

Scientific classification
- Kingdom: Animalia
- Phylum: Arthropoda
- Clade: Pancrustacea
- Class: Insecta
- Order: Hymenoptera
- Family: Colletidae
- Genus: Brachyhesma
- Species: B. perlutea

Binomial name
- Brachyhesma perlutea (Cockerell, 1916)

Synonyms
- Euryglossina sulphurella perlutea Cockerell, 1916

= Brachyhesma perlutea =

Species of bee

Brachyhesma perlutea, or Brachyhesma (Brachyhesma) perlutea, is a species of bee in the family Colletidae and the subfamily Euryglossinae. It is endemic to Australia. It was described in 1916 by British-American entomologist Theodore Dru Alison Cockerell.

== Distribution and habitat ==
The species occurs in south-western Australia. The type locality is Kalamunda, Western Australia.

== Behaviour ==
The adults are flying mellivores, with sedentary larvae, that nest in soil. Flowering plants visited by the bees include Eucalyptus species.
