= Euryglossula eremophilae =

Scientific classification
- Kingdom: Animalia
- Phylum: Arthropoda
- Clade: Pancrustacea
- Class: Insecta
- Order: Hymenoptera
- Family: Colletidae
- Genus: Euryglossula
- Species: E. eremophilae

Binomial name
- Euryglossula eremophilae Batley, 2016

Species of bee

Euryglossula eremophilae is a species of bee in the family Colletidae and the subfamily Euryglossinae. It is endemic to Australia. It was described in 2016 by Australian entomologist Michael Batley.

== Etymology ==
The specific epithet eremophilae refers to a favoured food plant of the bees.

== Description ==
Body length of females is 3.1 mm, that of males 2.7 mm.

== Distribution and habitat ==
The species occurs in arid inland eastern Australia. The type locality is 64 km north of Bourke in western New South Wales. It has also been recorded from Thylungra, 100 km north-west of Quilpie in the Channel Country of Queensland.

== Behaviour ==
Flowering plants visited by the bees include Eremophila and Grevillea species.
