= Euryglossula laticeps =

Scientific classification
- Kingdom: Animalia
- Phylum: Arthropoda
- Clade: Pancrustacea
- Class: Insecta
- Order: Hymenoptera
- Family: Colletidae
- Genus: Euryglossula
- Species: E. laticeps

Binomial name
- Euryglossula laticeps Batley, 2016

Species of bee

Euryglossula laticeps is a species of bee in the family Colletidae and the subfamily Euryglossinae. It is endemic to Australia. It was described in 2016 by Australian entomologist Michael Batley.

== Etymology ==
The specific epithet laticeps refers to the species’ relatively broad head.

== Description ==
Body length of females is 3.0 mm, that of males 3.4 mm; head width of females is 1.05 mm, males 1.09 mm.

== Distribution and habitat ==
The species occurs in the Channel Country of south-western Queensland. The type locality is 15 km west of Windorah.

== Behaviour ==
Flowering plants visited by the bees include Corymbia terminalis.
