= Euryglossula purpurea =

Scientific classification
- Kingdom: Animalia
- Phylum: Arthropoda
- Clade: Pancrustacea
- Class: Insecta
- Order: Hymenoptera
- Family: Colletidae
- Genus: Euryglossula
- Species: E. purpurea

Binomial name
- Euryglossula purpurea Batley, 2016

Species of bee

Euryglossula purpurea is a species of bee in the family Colletidae and the subfamily Euryglossinae. It is endemic to Australia. It was described in 2016 by Australian entomologist Michael Batley.

== Etymology ==
The specific epithet purpurea refers to the colour of the metallic sheen on the frons and scutum.

== Description ==
Body length of females is 3.4 mm, that of males 3.0 mm; head width of females is 1.0 mm, males 1.0 mm.

== Distribution and habitat ==
The species occurs in north central Australia. The type locality is 7 km north-west of the Barkly Roadhouse in the Northern Territory. It has also been recorded from Avon Downs Station, as well as from a site 10 km east of Camooweal in north-western Queensland.

== Behaviour ==
Flowering plants visited by the bees include Corymbia terminalis.
