= Brachyhesma microxantha =

Scientific classification
- Kingdom: Animalia
- Phylum: Arthropoda
- Clade: Pancrustacea
- Class: Insecta
- Order: Hymenoptera
- Family: Colletidae
- Genus: Brachyhesma
- Species: B. microxantha

Binomial name
- Brachyhesma microxantha (Cockerell, 1914)

Synonyms
- Euryglossina microxantha Cockerell, 1914

Species of bee

Brachyhesma microxantha, or Brachyhesma (Microhesma) microxantha, is a species of bee in the family Colletidae and the subfamily Euryglossinae. It is endemic to Australia. It was described in 1914 by British-American entomologist Theodore Dru Alison Cockerell.

== Distribution and habitat ==
The species occurs in eastern Queensland. The type locality is Mackay.

== Behaviour ==
The adults are flying mellivores. Flowering plants visited by the bees include Leptospermum species.
