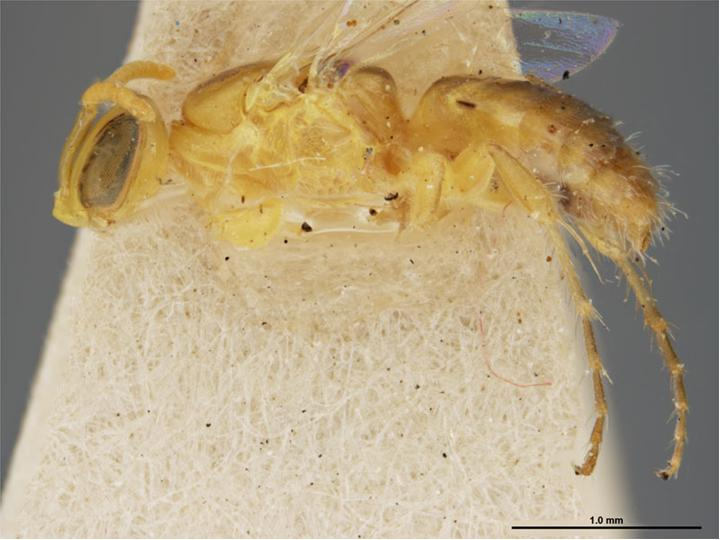
- Male

Scientific classification
- Kingdom: Animalia
- Phylum: Arthropoda
- Clade: Pancrustacea
- Class: Insecta
- Order: Hymenoptera
- Family: Colletidae
- Genus: Brachyhesma
- Species: B. hypoxantha

Binomial name
- Brachyhesma hypoxantha (Rayment, 1934)

Synonyms
- Euryglossina hypoxantha Rayment, 1934

= Brachyhesma hypoxantha =

Species of bee

Brachyhesma hypoxantha, or Brachyhesma (Brachyhesma) hypoxantha, is a species of bee in the family Colletidae and the subfamily Euryglossinae. It is endemic to Australia. It was described in 1934 by Australian entomologist Tarlton Rayment.

== Description ==
Body length of females is 4 mm. Colouration is black and yellow.

== Distribution and habitat ==
The species occurs in southern Australia. The type locality is Rottnest Island in Western Australia. Other published localities include Meningie, Purnong and North Beach in South Australia.

== Behaviour ==
The adults are flying mellivores. Flowering plants visited by the bees include Leptospermum and Melaleuca species.
