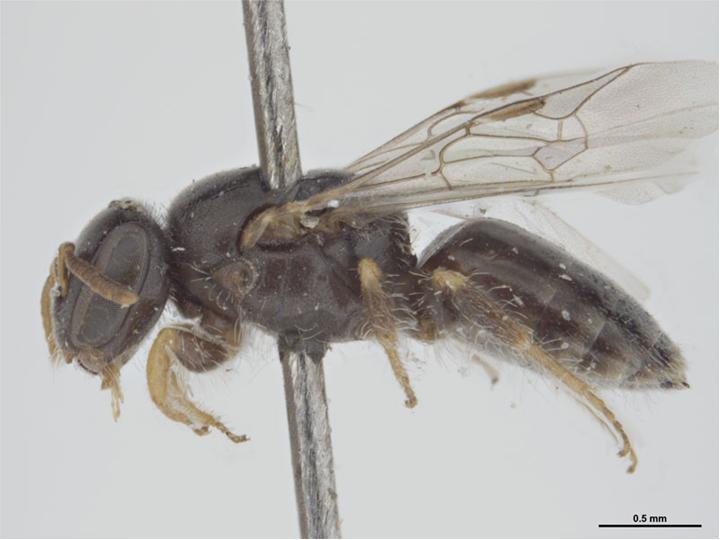
- Female

Scientific classification
- Kingdom: Animalia
- Phylum: Arthropoda
- Clade: Pancrustacea
- Class: Insecta
- Order: Hymenoptera
- Family: Colletidae
- Genus: Euryglossula
- Species: E. fultoni

Binomial name
- Euryglossula fultoni (Cockerell, 1913)

Synonyms
- Euryglossina fultoni Cockerell, 1913

= Euryglossula fultoni =

Species of bee

Euryglossula fultoni is a species of bee in the family Colletidae and the subfamily Euryglossinae. It is endemic to Australia. It was described in 1913 by British-American entomologist Theodore Dru Alison Cockerell.

== Distribution and habitat ==
The species occurs in southern and western Australia. The type locality is Purnong, near the Murray River in South Australia.

== Behaviour ==
The adults are flying mellivores. Flowering plants visited by the bees include Eucalyptus and Melaleuca species.

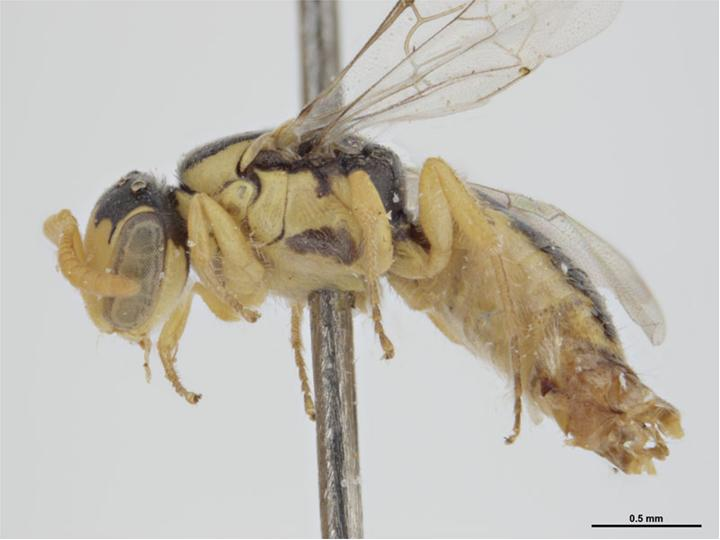
Male
