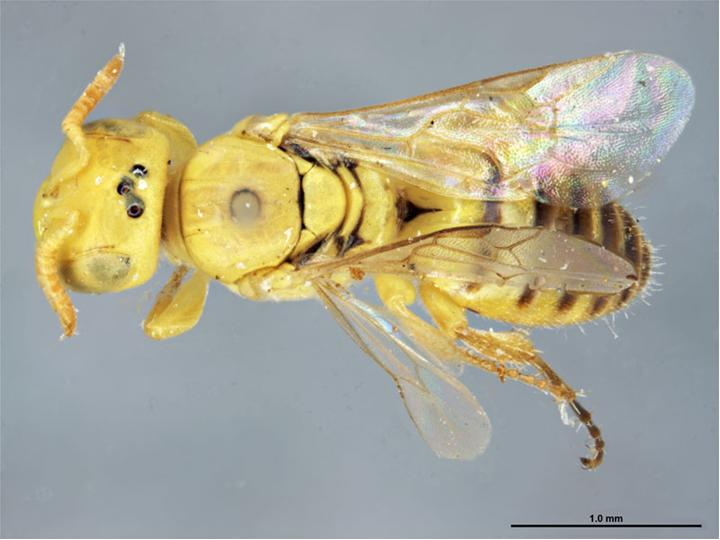
- Male

Scientific classification
- Kingdom: Animalia
- Phylum: Arthropoda
- Clade: Pancrustacea
- Class: Insecta
- Order: Hymenoptera
- Family: Colletidae
- Genus: Brachyhesma
- Species: B. incompleta

Binomial name
- Brachyhesma incompleta Michener, 1965

= Brachyhesma incompleta =

Species of bee

Brachyhesma incompleta, or Brachyhesma (Microhesma) incompleta, is a species of bee in the family Colletidae and the subfamily Euryglossinae. It is endemic to Australia. It was described in 1965 by American entomologist Charles Duncan Michener.

== Distribution and habitat ==
The species occurs in eastern Australia. The type locality is Tamborine Mountain in south-eastern Queensland.

== Behaviour ==
The adults are flying mellivores. Flowering plants visited by the bees include Angophora, Leptospermum, Melaleuca, Tristania and Eucalyptus species.
