= Euryglossula pallida =

Scientific classification
- Kingdom: Animalia
- Phylum: Arthropoda
- Clade: Pancrustacea
- Class: Insecta
- Order: Hymenoptera
- Family: Colletidae
- Genus: Euryglossula
- Species: E. pallida

Binomial name
- Euryglossula pallida Batley, 2016

Species of bee

Euryglossula pallida is a species of bee in the family Colletidae and the subfamily Euryglossinae. It is endemic to Australia. It was described in 2016 by Australian entomologist Michael Batley.

== Etymology ==
The specific epithet pallida refers to the species’ relatively pale colouring.

== Description ==
Body length of females is 3.3 mm, that of males 3.0 mm; head width of females is 1.05 mm, males 1.0 mm.

== Distribution and habitat ==
The species occurs in north central Australia. The type locality is 6 km north-east of the Barkly Roadhouse in the Northern Territory.

== Behaviour ==
Flowering plants visited by the bees include Corymbia terminalis.
