= Euryglossula incisa =

Scientific classification
- Kingdom: Animalia
- Phylum: Arthropoda
- Clade: Pancrustacea
- Class: Insecta
- Order: Hymenoptera
- Family: Colletidae
- Genus: Euryglossula
- Species: E. incisa

Binomial name
- Euryglossula incisa Batley, 2016

Species of bee

Euryglossula incisa is a species of bee in the family Colletidae and the subfamily Euryglossinae. It is endemic to Australia. It was described in 2016 by Australian entomologist Michael Batley.

== Etymology ==
The specific epithet incisa is an anatomical reference to the colour pattern on the dorsal metasoma of the males.

== Description ==
Body length of females is 3.5 mm, that of males 2.9 mm.

== Distribution and habitat ==
The species occurs in South West Queensland. The type locality is 13 km east of Cheepie.

== Behaviour ==
Flowering plants visited by the bees include Eucalyptus species.
