= Euryglossula kubinensis =

Scientific classification
- Kingdom: Animalia
- Phylum: Arthropoda
- Clade: Pancrustacea
- Class: Insecta
- Order: Hymenoptera
- Family: Colletidae
- Genus: Euryglossula
- Species: E. kubinensis

Binomial name
- Euryglossula kubinensis Batley, 2016

Species of bee

Euryglossula kubinensis is a species of bee in the family Colletidae and the subfamily Euryglossinae. It is endemic to Australia. It was described in 2016 by Australian entomologist Michael Batley.

== Etymology ==
The specific epithet kubinensis refers to the collection location.

== Description ==
Body length of females is 3.3 mm, that of males 2.5 mm.

== Distribution and habitat ==
The species occurs in the Torres Strait Islands of Far North Queensland. The type locality is Kubin on Moa Island.

== Behaviour ==
Flowering plants visited by the bees include Melaleuca species.
