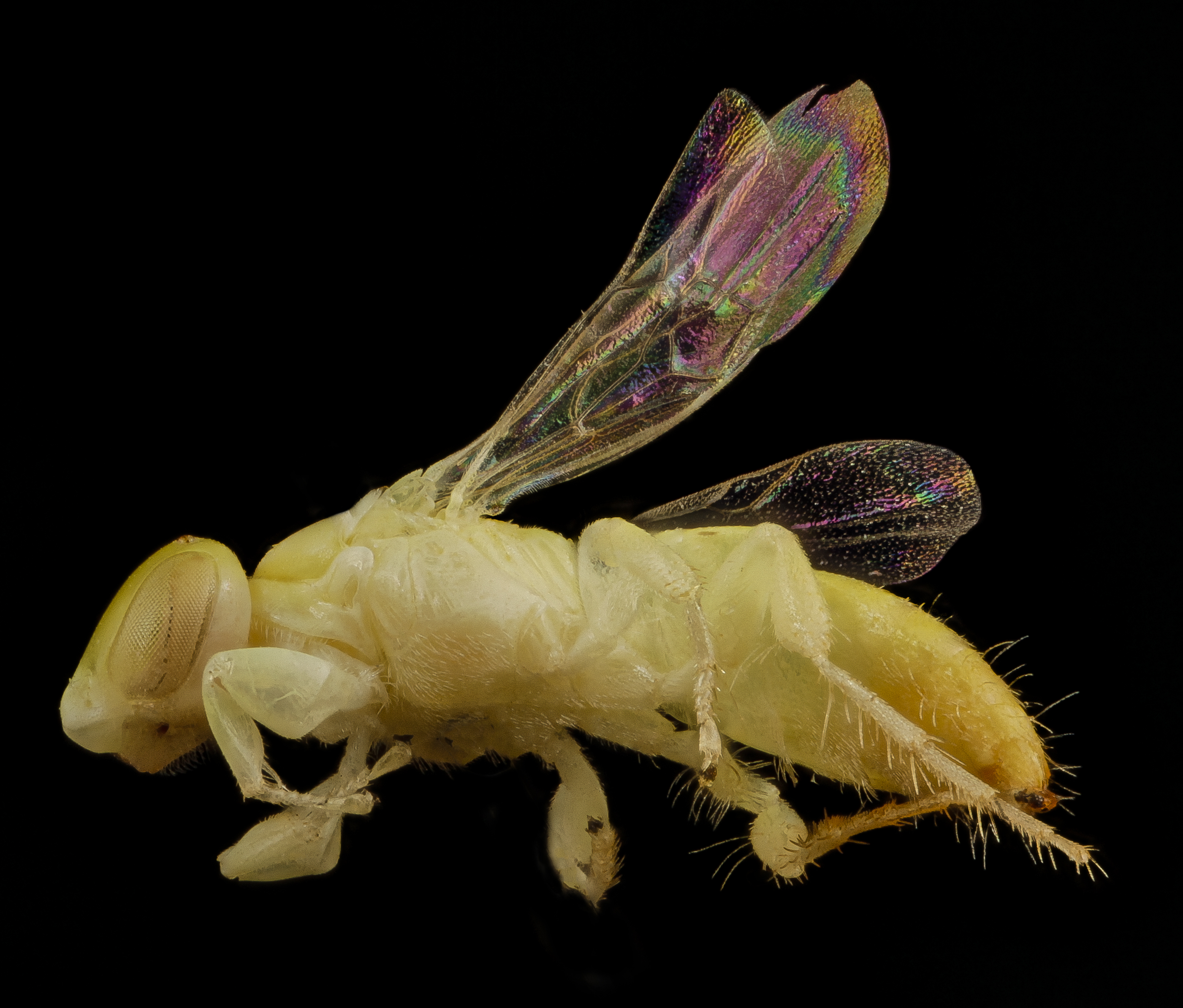
- Lateral view

Scientific classification
- Kingdom: Animalia
- Phylum: Arthropoda
- Clade: Pancrustacea
- Class: Insecta
- Order: Hymenoptera
- Family: Colletidae
- Genus: Brachyhesma
- Species: B. sulphurella

Binomial name
- Brachyhesma sulphurella (Cockerell, 1913)

Synonyms
- Euryglossina sulphurella Cockerell, 1913; Euryglossina bicolor Rayment, 1928; Euryglossina sulphurella colorata Rayment, 1935

= Brachyhesma sulphurella =

Species of bee

Brachyhesma sulphurella, or Brachyhesma (Brachyhesma) sulphurella, is a species of bee in the family Colletidae and the subfamily Euryglossinae. It is endemic to Australia. It was described in 1913 by British-American entomologist Theodore Dru Alison Cockerell.

== Distribution and habitat ==
The species occurs across much of southern Australia. The type locality is Purnong, on the Murray River in South Australia.

== Behaviour ==
The adults are flying mellivores. Flowering plants visited by the bees include Eucalyptus species.

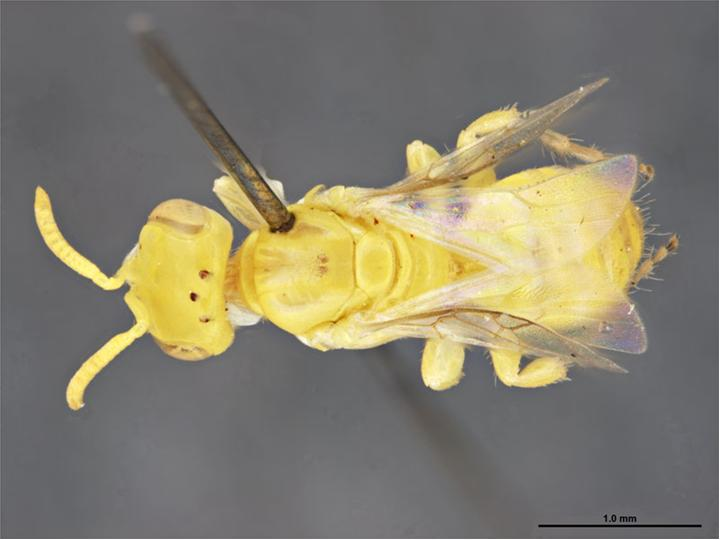
Male, dorsal view
