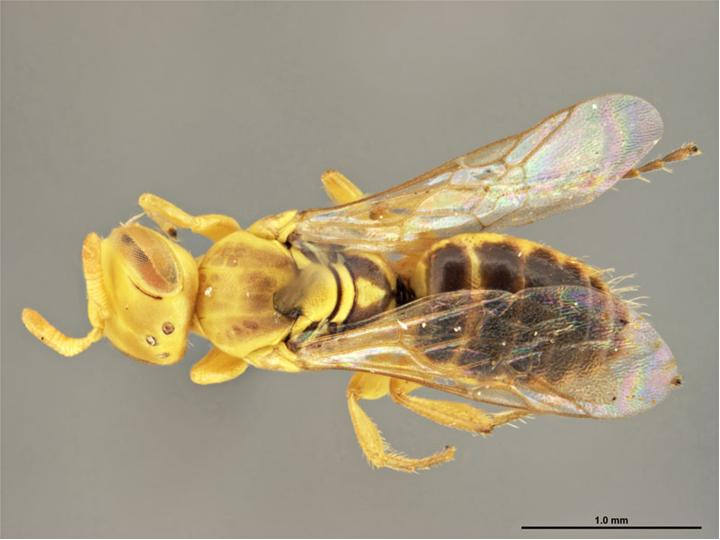
- Male

Scientific classification
- Kingdom: Animalia
- Phylum: Arthropoda
- Clade: Pancrustacea
- Class: Insecta
- Order: Hymenoptera
- Family: Colletidae
- Genus: Brachyhesma
- Species: B. cooki

Binomial name
- Brachyhesma cooki Michener, 1965

= Brachyhesma cooki =

Species of bee

Brachyhesma cooki, or Brachyhesma (Microhesma) cooki, is a species of bee in the family Colletidae and the subfamily Euryglossinae. It is endemic to Australia. It was described in 1965 by American entomologist Charles Duncan Michener.

== Distribution and habitat ==
The species occurs in eastern Australia. The type locality is Botany Bay, near Sydney in New South Wales. Other published localities include Amiens and Stanthorpe in south-eastern Queensland.

== Behaviour ==
The adults are flying mellivores. Flowering plants visited by the bees include Leptospermum and Eucalyptus species.
