= Euryglossula storeyi =

Scientific classification
- Kingdom: Animalia
- Phylum: Arthropoda
- Clade: Pancrustacea
- Class: Insecta
- Order: Hymenoptera
- Family: Colletidae
- Genus: Euryglossula
- Species: E. storeyi

Binomial name
- Euryglossula storeyi Batley, 2016

Species of bee

Euryglossula storeyi is a species of bee in the family Colletidae and the subfamily Euryglossinae. It is endemic to Australia. It was described in 2016 by Australian entomologist Michael Batley.

== Etymology ==
The specific epithet storeyi honours Ross Storey who collected the first specimens of these bees.

== Description ==
Body length of females is 3.1 mm, that of males 2.5 mm; head width of females is 0.98 mm, males 0.85 mm.

== Distribution and habitat ==
The species occurs on the Cape York Peninsula of Far North Queensland. The type locality is Walsh River via Chillagoe.

== Behaviour ==
Flowering plants visited by the bees include Syzygium eucalyptoides.
