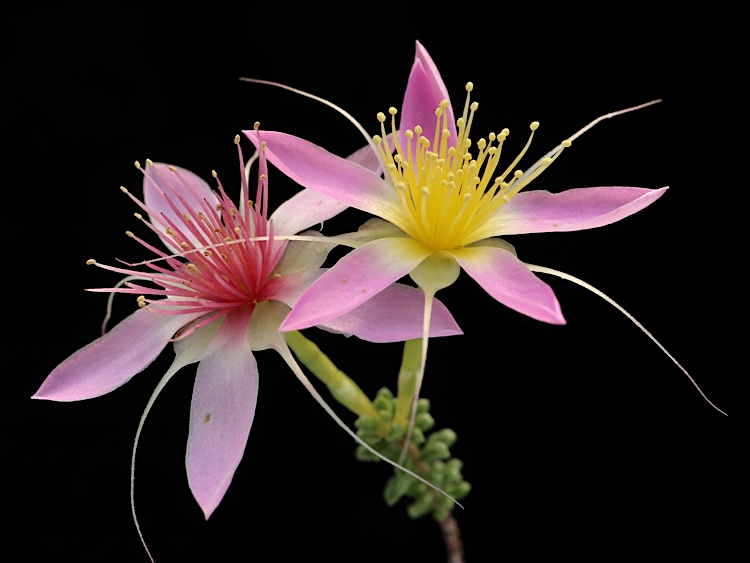
- In the ANBG

Conservation status
- Vulnerable (EPBC Act)

Scientific classification
- Kingdom: Plantae
- Clade: Tracheophytes
- Clade: Angiosperms
- Clade: Eudicots
- Clade: Rosids
- Order: Myrtales
- Family: Myrtaceae
- Genus: Calytrix
- Species: C. longiflora

Binomial name
- Calytrix longiflora (F.Muell.) Benth.

= Calytrix longiflora =

Species of flowering plant

Calytrix longiflora, commonly known as pink fringe myrtle, is a species of flowering plant in the myrtle family Myrtaceae and is endemic to eastern Australia. It is a shrub with egg-shaped to narrowly lance-shaped leaves with the narrower end towards the base, and pink to mauve flowers with about 35 to 65 yellowish stamens in several rows.

== Description ==
Calytrix longiflora is a mostly glabrous shrub that typically grows to a height of up to 2.5 m (8 ft 2 in). Its leaves are egg-shaped to lance-shaped with the narrower end towards the base, sometimes elliptic or linear, 1.25–5.5 mm (0.049–0.217 in) long and 0.75–1.75 mm (0.030–0.069 in) wide on a petiole 0.25–1 mm (0.0098–0.0394 in) long. There are stipules up to 0.4 mm (0.016 in) long at the base of the petiole. The flowers are borne on a peduncle 4.0–5.5 mm (0.16–0.22 in) long with more or less round to egg-shaped lobes with the narrower end towards the base, 1.75–2.5 mm (0.069–0.098 in) long. The floral tube is free from the style, 7–17 mm (0.28–0.67 in) long and has 10 ribs. The sepals are fused at the base, with more or less round to broadly elliptic lobes 2.25–3.5 mm (0.089–0.138 in) long and 2.5–3.5 mm (0.098–0.138 in) wide, with an awn up to 15 mm (0.59 in) long. The petals are pink to mauve, whitish near the base, narrowly elliptic, 9.0–10.5 mm (0.35–0.41 in) long and 2.5–3.5 mm (0.098–0.138 in) wide, and there are about 35 to 65 yellowish stamens in several rows. Flowering occurs from January to November, usually in January and February and from September to November.

== Taxonomy ==
This species was first formally described in 1858 by Ferdinand von Mueller who gave it the name Calycothrix longiflora in his Fragmenta phytographiae Australiae from specimens collected by Tomas Mitchell. In 1867, George Bentham transferred the species to Calytrix as C. longiflora in his Flora Australiensis. The specific epithet (longiflora) means 'long-flowered'.

== Distribution and habitat ==
This species of Calytrix grows in ironbark-Triodia vegetation on sand dunes from the Springsure-Tambo district in Queensland to the Yantabulla-Bourke district in New South Wales.

== Conservation status ==
Calytrix longiflora is listed as of "least concern" under the Queensland Government Nature Conservation Act 1992.
