= Elizabeth Exley =

Australian entomologist (1927-2007)

Elizabeth Morris Exley (29 November 1927 – 1 September 2007) was an entomologist who researched Australian native bees, particularly those in the subfamily Euryglossinae.

== Early life and education ==
Elizabeth Exley was born in Bardon, Brisbane, Queensland, on 29 November 1927. Her extended family owned Bardon House, a home which later became part of St Joseph's Catholic School at Bardon in 1925. Her grandmother, also named Elizabeth Exley, was credited with establishing a local branch of Mother's Union, which became a district nursing service now known as Anglicare. Young Elizabeth's father was a founding member of the Queensland Naturalists' Club, and the family had a strong interest in natural history. She attended Rainworth State School and Brisbane Girls Grammar School from 1941 to 1944. She enrolled in a B.Sc. at the University of Queensland in 1945. She took her Honours degree in 1949 studying fruit fly larvae whilst working as a demonstrator.

After winning a scholarship, Exley studied an education diploma at the Imperial College, London in 1953. She worked as an entomologist with the Queensland Department of Agriculture in 1954. Exley went on to take her master's degree from the university in 1956. After initially studying ants, she switched to bees after working with Professor Charles Michener of the University of Kansas, during his Fulbright Scholarship visit to UQ in 1958. Very little was known of native bee fauna in Australia, and she undertook extensive systematics of the family Colletidae, Euryglossinae, which are associated with Australia's myrtaceous plants, especially eucalypts. Exley earned her PhD in 1968, with her research on Australian native bees.

== Career ==
After working at the Queensland Department of Agriculture in the mid-1950s, Exley began employment as a tutor at the university in 1958. She rose through the ranks, before retiring in 1992 as an associate professor. She would describe and name over 230 new species of bee during her research career, including Homalictus exleyea.

She amassed a large collection of bee specimens, in her trips to the tropics of Australia, study visits to museums and institutions throughout the world, including those of Professor Michener's laboratories in Kansas and wrote a number of papers.

In the 1980s, she worked on the pollination of crops, in particular lychee, macadamia, pigeon pea and custard apple trees, some in collaboration with CSIRO.

She was head of the Department of Entomology in 1982 at the university, and served on the boards of the Faculty of Science, Agriculture and the Standing Committee of Convocation.

She was a member of the Queensland Entomological Society, the Australian Entomological Society and Queensland Naturalists' Society.

Elizabeth Exley died on 1 September 2007 in Brisbane.

Her bee collection, which is held in the School of Biological Sciences at the University of Queensland, is estimated as one of the largest in Australia.
