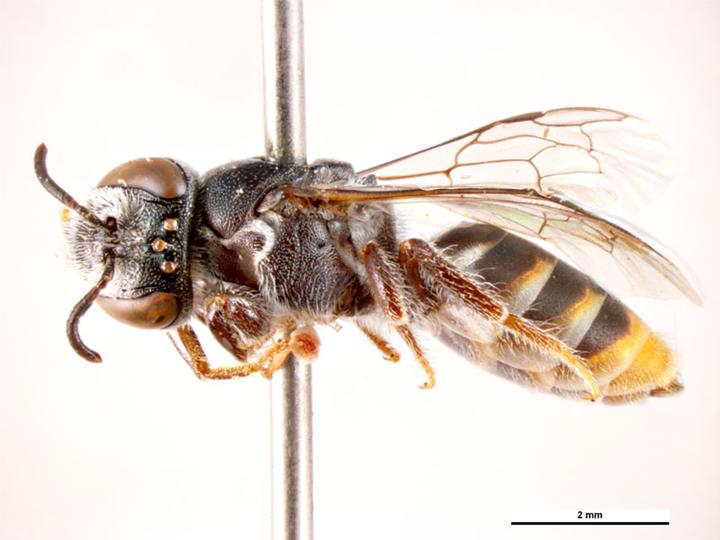
- Female

Scientific classification
- Kingdom: Animalia
- Phylum: Arthropoda
- Clade: Pancrustacea
- Class: Insecta
- Order: Hymenoptera
- Family: Colletidae
- Genus: Euryglossa
- Species: E. salaris

Binomial name
- Euryglossa salaris Cockerell, 1910

= Euryglossa salaris =

Species of bee

Euryglossa salaris is a species of bee in the family Colletidae and the subfamily Euryglossinae. It is endemic to Australia. It was described in 1910 by British-American entomologist Theodore Dru Alison Cockerell.

== Description ==
Body length is 9 mm. The head and thorax are black; the abdomen ferruginous to black, banded with pale hair on segment margins.

== Distribution and habitat ==
The species occurs in eastern Australia. The type locality is Mackay.

== Behaviour ==
The adults are flying mellivores. Flowering plants visited by the bees include Eucalyptus and Tristania species.
