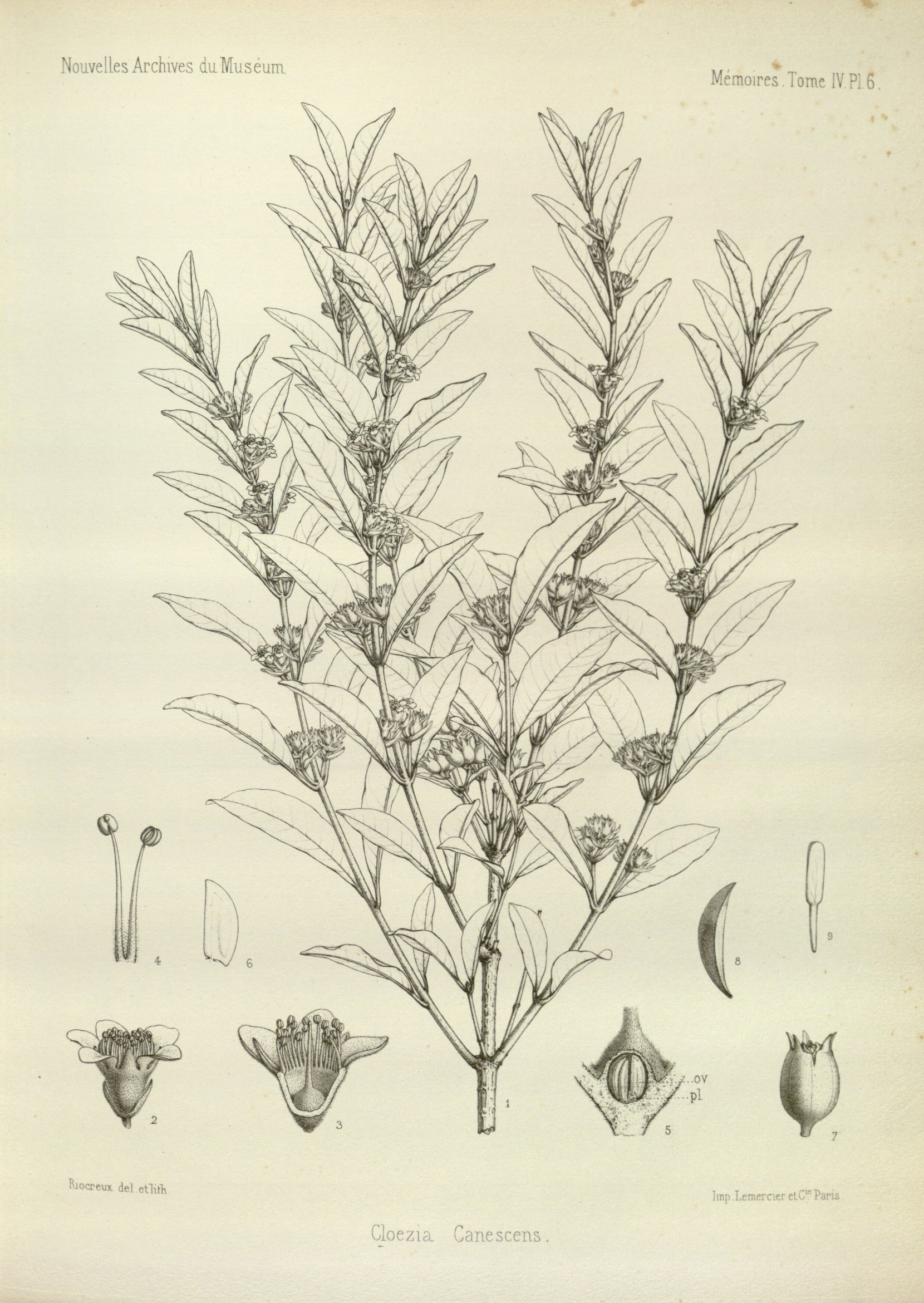
- Cloezia artensis

Scientific classification
- Kingdom: Plantae
- Clade: Tracheophytes
- Clade: Angiosperms
- Clade: Eudicots
- Clade: Rosids
- Order: Myrtales
- Family: Myrtaceae
- Tribe: Kanieae
- Genus: Cloezia; Brongn. & Gris

Synonyms
- Mooria Montrouz.

= Cloezia =

Genus of flowering plants

Cloezia is a genus of flowering plants in the family Myrtaceae first described as a genus in 1863. The entire genus is endemic to New Caledonia. It is related to Thaleropia, Tristania and Xanthomyrtus.

== Species ==
1. Cloezia aquarum
2. Cloezia artensis
3. Cloezia buxifolia
4. Cloezia deplanchei
5. Cloezia floribunda
6. Cloezia × glaberrima
