= Euryglossa politifrons =

Scientific classification
- Kingdom: Animalia
- Phylum: Arthropoda
- Clade: Pancrustacea
- Class: Insecta
- Order: Hymenoptera
- Family: Colletidae
- Genus: Euryglossa
- Species: E. politifrons

Binomial name
- Euryglossa politifrons Cockerell, 1922

Species of bee

Euryglossa politifrons is a species of bee in the family Colletidae and the subfamily Euryglossinae. It is endemic to Australia. It was described in 1922 by British-American entomologist Theodore Dru Alison Cockerell.

== Description ==
Body length is 6 mm. The head is black, thorax and abdomen mainly ferruginous-red.

== Distribution and habitat ==
The species occurs in eastern Australia. The type locality is Emerald, Queensland.

== Behaviour ==
The adults are flying mellivores. Flowering plants visited by the bees include Eucalyptus, Melaleuca and Tristania species.
