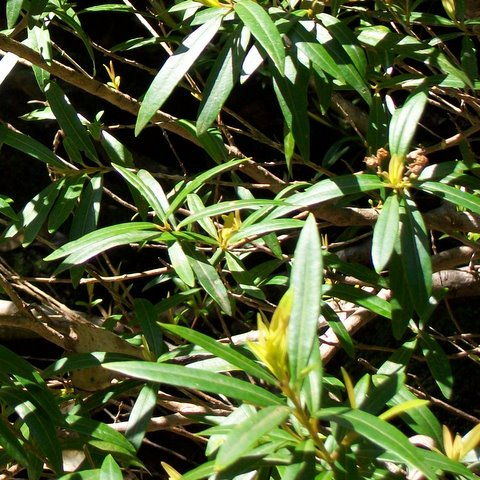
- Tristania neriifolia at Ourimbah

Scientific classification
- Kingdom: Plantae
- Clade: Tracheophytes
- Clade: Angiosperms
- Clade: Eudicots
- Clade: Rosids
- Order: Myrtales
- Family: Myrtaceae
- Subfamily: Myrtoideae
- Tribe: Tristanieae

= Tristanieae =

Tribe of flowering plants

Tristanieae is a tribe in the plant family Myrtaceae from south-east Asia and Oceania.

== Genera ==
- Cloezia (New Caledonia)
- Tristania (Australia)
- Thaleropia (Australia)
- Xanthomyrtus (from Philippines to New Caledonia)
