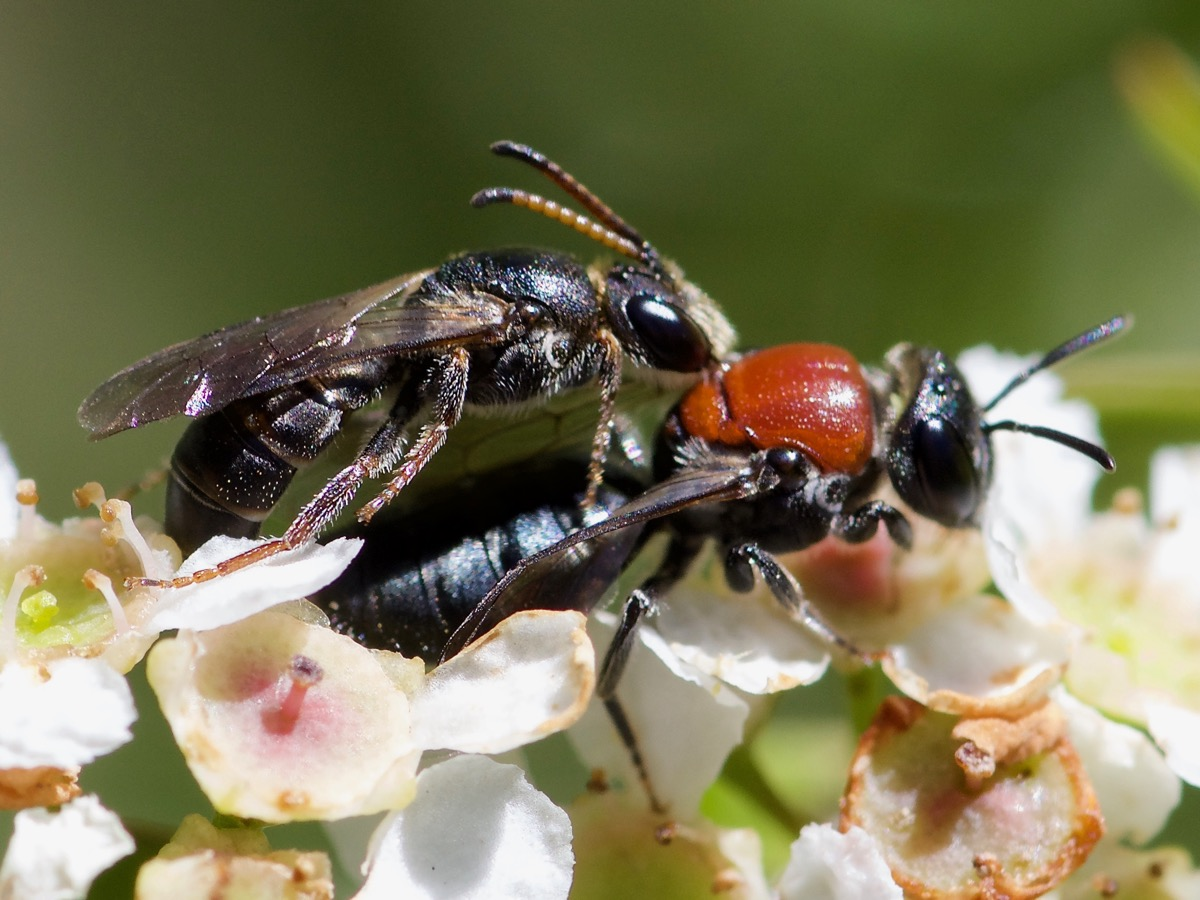

Scientific classification
- Kingdom: Animalia
- Phylum: Arthropoda
- Clade: Pancrustacea
- Class: Insecta
- Order: Hymenoptera
- Family: Colletidae
- Genus: Euryglossa
- Species: E. adelaidae

Binomial name
- Euryglossa adelaidae Cockerell, 1905

Synonyms
- Halictus oxleyi Cockerell, 1905; Euryglossa chrysoceras Cockerell, 1910; Euryglossa leptospermi Cockerell, 1910; Euryglossa myrtacearum Cockerell, 1910; Euryglossa variabilis Perkins, 1912; Euryglossa sanguinosa Cockerell, 1913; Stilpnosoma variegatum Friese, 1924; Euryglossa albosignata Cockerell, 1929; Euryglossa coventryi Rayment, 1935; Euryglossa ephippiata punctata Rayment, 1939

= Euryglossa adelaidae =

Species of bee

Euryglossa adelaidae is a species of bee in the family Colletidae and the subfamily Euryglossinae. It is endemic to Australia. It was described in 1905 by British-American entomologist Theodore Dru Alison Cockerell. It was extensively synonymised in 1976 by Australian entomologist Elizabeth Exley.

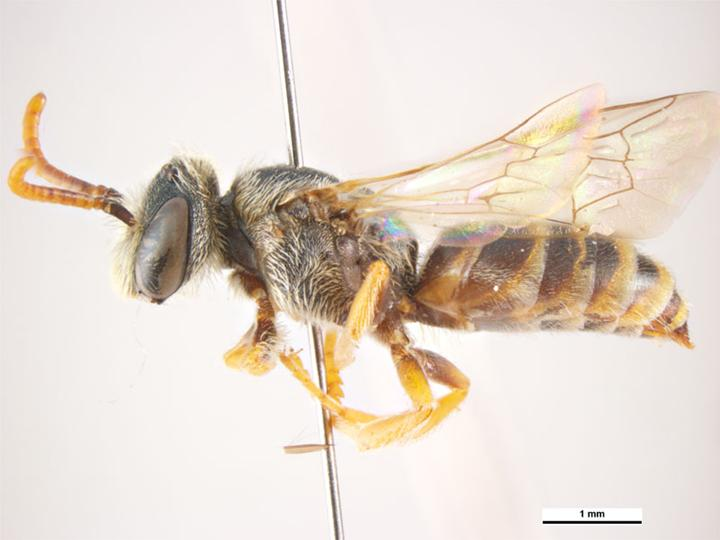
Male

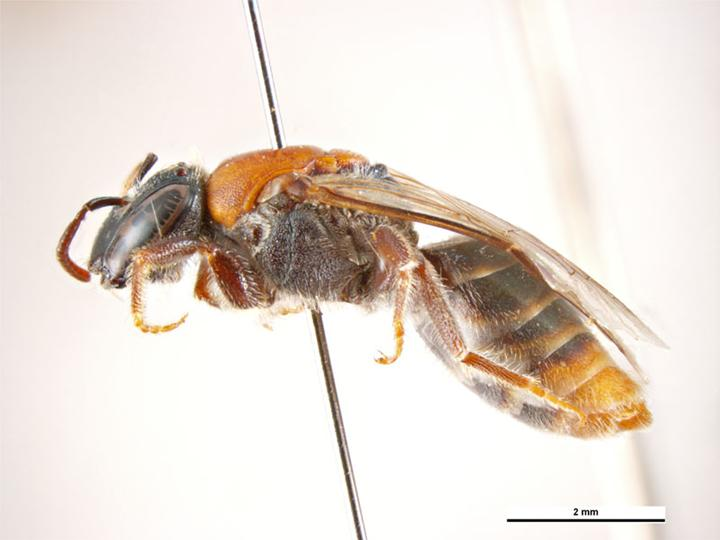
Female

== Distribution and habitat ==
The species occurs in eastern Australia. The original type locality is Adelaide in South Australia.

== Behaviour ==
The adults are flying mellivores. Flowering plants visited by the bees include Angophora, Callistemon, Eucalyptus, Leptospermum, Melaleuca and Tristania species.
