= Dissoptila mutabilis =

Scientific classification
- Domain: Eukaryota
- Kingdom: Animalia
- Phylum: Arthropoda
- Class: Insecta
- Order: Lepidoptera
- Family: Gelechiidae
- Genus: Dissoptila
- Species: D. mutabilis

Binomial name
- Dissoptila mutabilis Meyrick, 1914

Moth in the family Gelechiidae from Guyana

Dissoptila mutabilis is a moth in the family Gelechiidae. It was described by Edward Meyrick in 1914. It is found in Guyana.

The wingspan is 9–10 mm. The forewings are pale yellowish ochreous or whitish ochreous, sometimes only faintly clouded with darker, often more or less wholly suffused with grey or dark grey irroration (sprinkling). The basal area is sometimes mixed with ferruginous yellow and there are two large blackish tufts transversely placed in the disc at one-third. There are often longitudinal grey marks on the costa before the middle and about two-thirds. The hindwings are rather dark grey, paler and thinly scaled in the disc anteriorly.
