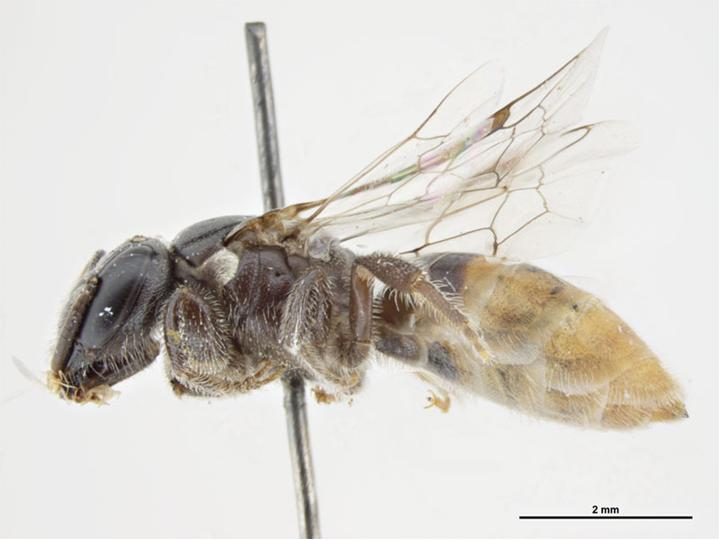
- Female

Scientific classification
- Kingdom: Animalia
- Phylum: Arthropoda
- Clade: Pancrustacea
- Class: Insecta
- Order: Hymenoptera
- Family: Colletidae
- Genus: Euryglossa
- Species: E. subfusa

Binomial name
- Euryglossa subfusa Cockerell, 1910

= Euryglossa subfusa =

Species of bee

Euryglossa subfusa is a species of bee in the family Colletidae and the subfamily Euryglossinae. It is endemic to Australia. It was described in 1910 by British-American entomologist Theodore Dru Alison Cockerell.

== Description ==
Body length is 8.5 mm. The head and thorax are glossy black; the abdomen red and black.<

== Distribution and habitat ==
The species occurs in northern Australia. The type locality is Port Darwin in the Top End. It has also been recorded from Herberton in Far North Queensland.

== Behaviour ==
The adults are flying mellivores. Flowering plants visited by the bees include Eucalyptus and Tristania species.
