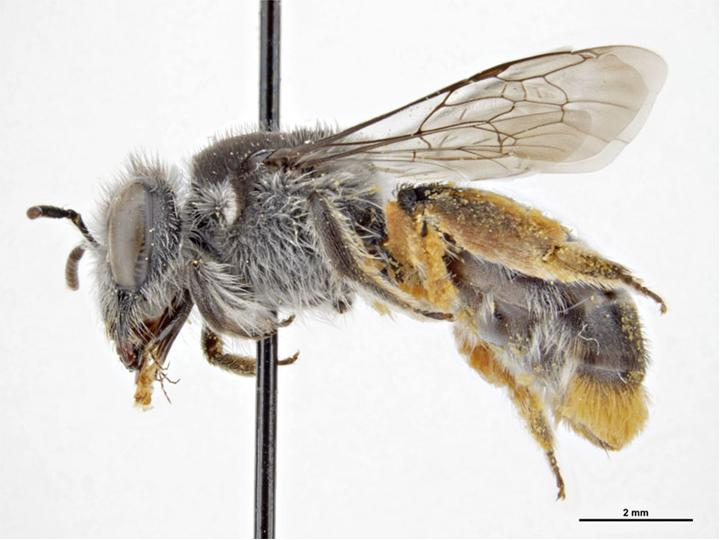
- Female

Scientific classification
- Kingdom: Animalia
- Phylum: Arthropoda
- Clade: Pancrustacea
- Class: Insecta
- Order: Hymenoptera
- Family: Colletidae
- Genus: Leioproctus
- Species: L. callurus

Binomial name
- Leioproctus callurus (Cockerell, 1914)

Synonyms
- Paracolletes callurus Cockerell, 1914; Paracolletes callurus nigrior Cockerell, 1914

= Leioproctus callurus =

Species of bee

Leioproctus callurus, or Leioproctus (Odontocolletes) callurus, is a species of bee in the family Colletidae and subfamily Colletinae. It is endemic to Australia. It was described by British-American entomologist Theodore Dru Alison Cockerell in 1914.

== Description ==
Female body length is 10 mm. Colouration is mainly black, abdomen partly reddish, with white to rust-red hair.

== Distribution and habitat ==
The species occurs in south-west Western Australia. Type localities include Yallingup and King George Sound.

== Behaviour ==
The adults are flying mellivores.

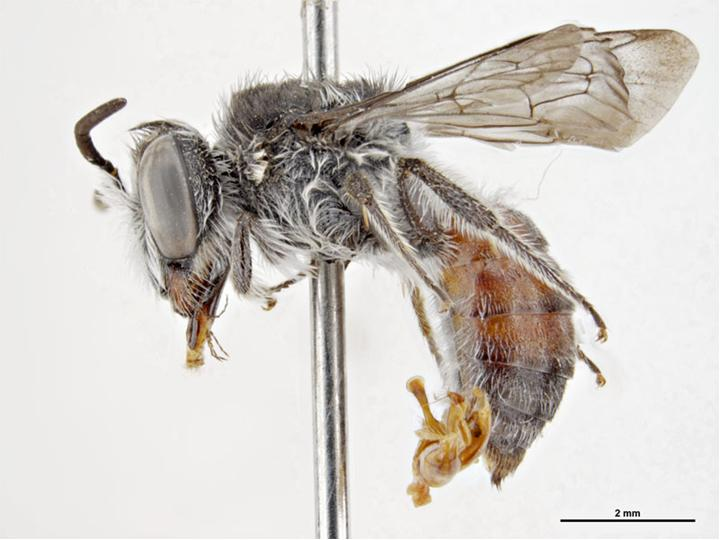
Male
