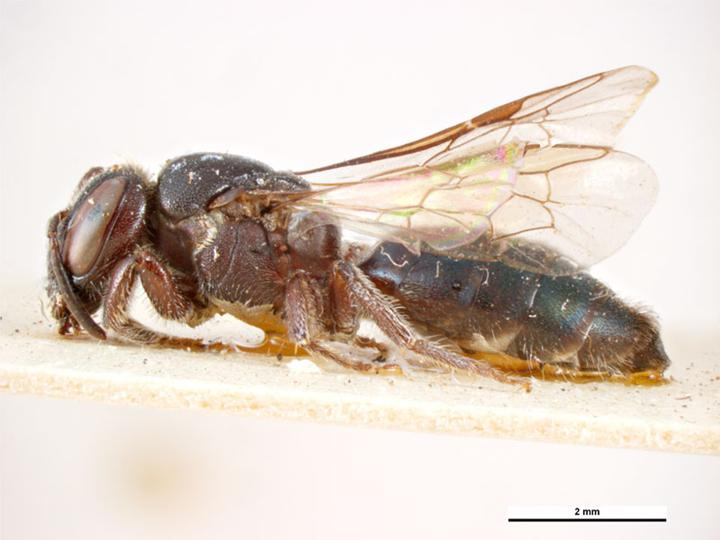
- Female

Scientific classification
- Kingdom: Animalia
- Phylum: Arthropoda
- Clade: Pancrustacea
- Class: Insecta
- Order: Hymenoptera
- Family: Colletidae
- Genus: Euryglossa
- Species: E. subsericea

Binomial name
- Euryglossa subsericea Cockerell, 1905

Synonyms
- Euryglossa reginae Cockerell, 1905; Stilpnosoma turneri Baker, 1906; Euryglossa aurescens Cockerell, 1913; Stilpnosoma thoracicum Friese, 1924; Stilpnosoma ventrale Friese, 1924; Stilpnosoma turneri Friese, 1924

= Euryglossa subsericea =

Species of bee

Euryglossa subsericea is a species of bee in the family Colletidae and the subfamily Euryglossinae. It is endemic to Australia. It was described in 1905 by British-American entomologist Theodore Dru Alison Cockerell. It was extensively synonymised in 1976 by Australian entomologist Elizabeth Exley.

== Distribution and habitat ==
The species occurs in eastern Australia. The original type locality is in Queensland.

== Behaviour ==
The adults are flying mellivores with sedentary larvae. They nest in soil. Flowering plants visited by the bees include Angophora, Dendrobium, Eucalyptus, Eugenia, Leptospermum, Melaleuca and Tristania species.
