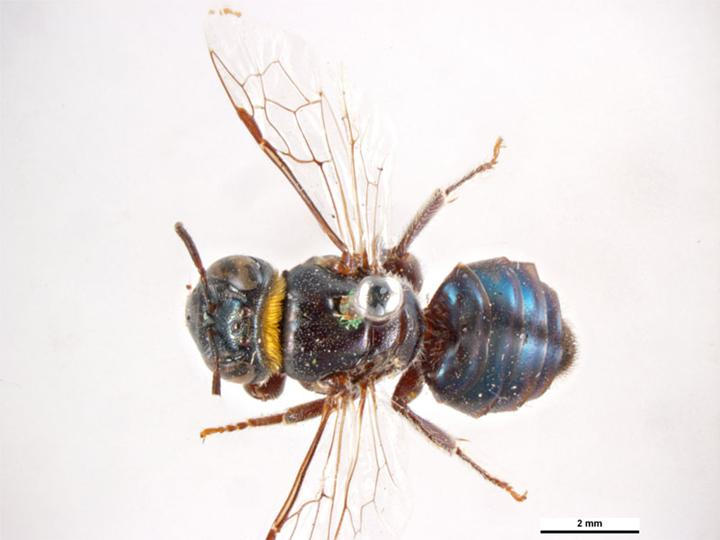
- Female

Scientific classification
- Kingdom: Animalia
- Phylum: Arthropoda
- Clade: Pancrustacea
- Class: Insecta
- Order: Hymenoptera
- Family: Colletidae
- Genus: Euryglossa
- Species: E. rubricata

Binomial name
- Euryglossa rubricata Smith, 1879

Synonyms
- Euryglossa tricolor Smith, 1879

= Euryglossa rubricata =

Species of bee

Euryglossa rubricata is a species of bee in the family Colletidae and the subfamily Euryglossinae. It is endemic to Australia. It was described in 1879 by English entomologist Frederick Smith.

== Description ==
Body length is 7 mm. Head and thorax are black, the abdomen mainly ferruginous with the apex blue-black.

== Distribution and habitat ==
The species occurs in southern mainland Australia. The type locality is Swan River – in the vicinity of Perth.

== Behaviour ==
The adults are flying mellivores. Flowering plants visited by the bees include Eucalyptus species.
