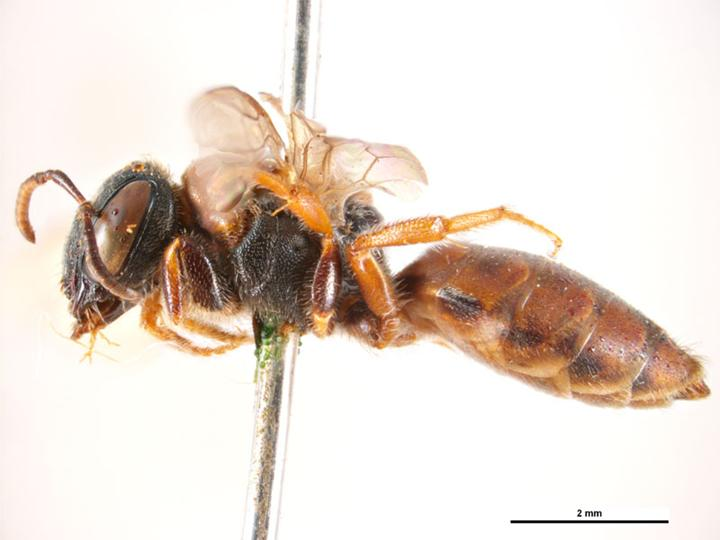
- Female

Scientific classification
- Kingdom: Animalia
- Phylum: Arthropoda
- Clade: Pancrustacea
- Class: Insecta
- Order: Hymenoptera
- Family: Colletidae
- Genus: Euryglossa
- Species: E. edwardsii

Binomial name
- Euryglossa edwardsii Cockerell, 1907

Synonyms
- Euryglossa ruberrima Cockerell, 1913; Euryglossa apicalis Cockerell, 1913; Euryglossa depressa sparsa Cockerell, 1916

= Euryglossa edwardsii =

Species of bee

Euryglossa edwardsii is a species of bee in the family Colletidae and the subfamily Euryglossinae. It is endemic to Australia. It was described in 1907 by British-American entomologist Theodore Dru Alison Cockerell. It was extensively synonymised in 1976 by Australian entomologist Elizabeth Exley.

== Distribution and habitat ==
The species occurs in eastern Australia. The original type locality is in New South Wales.

== Behaviour ==
The adults are flying mellivores. Flowering plants visited by the bees include Eucalyptus, Leptospermum, Melaleuca and Tristania species.
