= Euryglossa haematura =

Scientific classification
- Kingdom: Animalia
- Phylum: Arthropoda
- Clade: Pancrustacea
- Class: Insecta
- Order: Hymenoptera
- Family: Colletidae
- Genus: Euryglossa
- Species: E. haematura

Binomial name
- Euryglossa haematura Cockerell, 1911

Species of bee

Euryglossa haematura is a species of bee in the family Colletidae and the subfamily Euryglossinae. It is endemic to Australia. It was described in 1911 by British-American entomologist Theodore Dru Alison Cockerell.

== Description ==
Body length is 14 mm. The head and thorax are black; the abdomen dull black with the final segments bright ferruginous-red.

== Distribution and habitat ==
The species occurs in New South Wales. The type locality is Walcha. It has also been recorded from Barrington Tops.

== Behaviour ==
The adults are flying mellivores with sedentary larvae. They may nest in creek banks.
