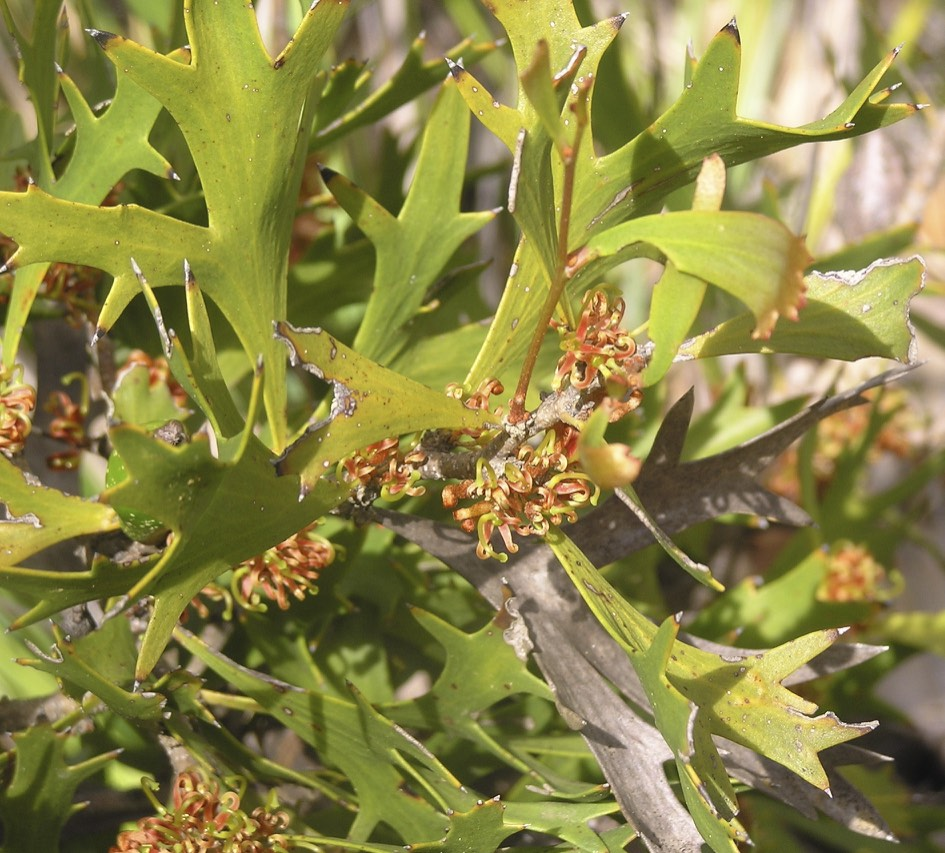
- Hakea ceratophylla growing near Mount Barker

Scientific classification
- Kingdom: Plantae
- Clade: Tracheophytes
- Clade: Angiosperms
- Clade: Eudicots
- Order: Proteales
- Family: Proteaceae
- Genus: Hakea
- Species: H. ceratophylla

Binomial name
- Hakea ceratophylla (Sm.) R.Br.
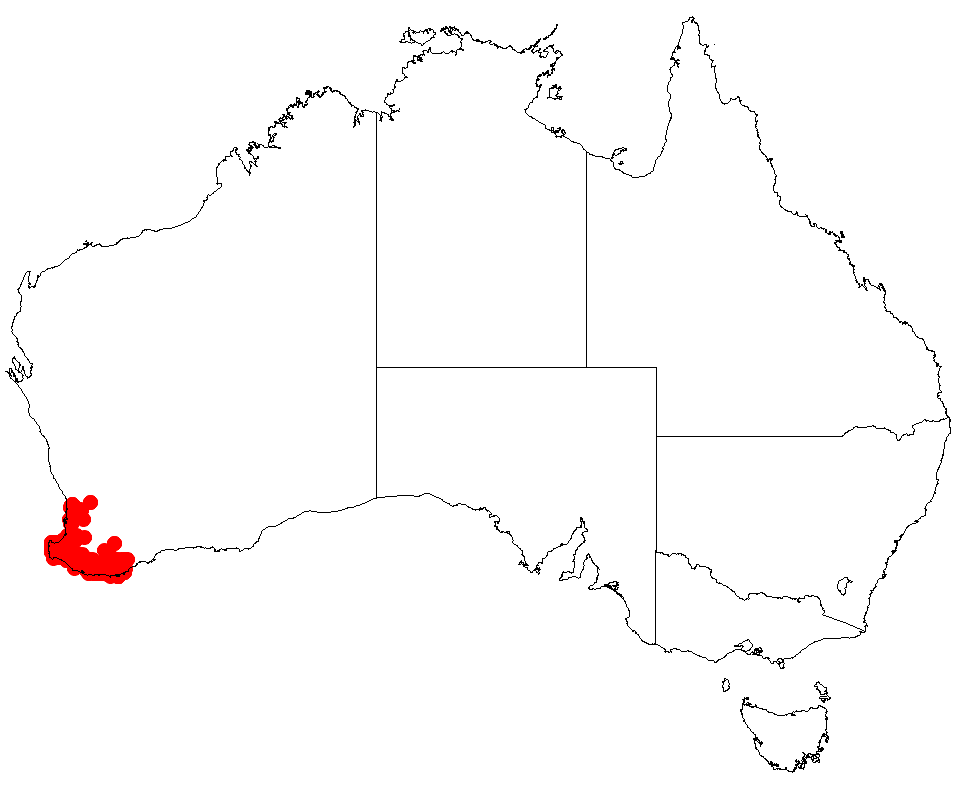
- Occurrence data from AVH

= Hakea ceratophylla =

Horned leaf hakea

Species of shrub endemic to Western Australia

Hakea ceratophylla, commonly known as the horned leaf hakea, is a shrub in the family Proteaceae. It is endemic to the southwest of Western Australia. It is a stiff shrub with variably-shaped leaves that are sometimes lobed and flowers with white or rusty-coloured hairs.

== Description ==
Hakea ceratophylla is a stiff, multi-stemmed shrub that typically grows to a height of 0.5 to 2 metres (1.6 to 6.6 ft). Its young branchlets and leaves are covered with rust-coloured hairs but become glabrous as they age. The mature leaves vary in shape from linear to narrow egg-shaped with the narrow end towards the base, 4.5 to 23 centimetres (1.8 to 9.1 in) long and 0.2 to 1.4 cm (0.08 to 0.55 in) wide, to leaves with between three and five lobes. Lobed leaves are 3.5 to 8.5 cm (1.38 to 3.35 in) wide with lobes 1 to 26 mm (0.04 to 1.02 in) long. The flowers are arranged in umbels containing between two and ten flowers with no apparent stalk. Each flower has a pedicel 2 to 5 millimetres (0.079 to 0.197 in) long and is covered with white and rust-coloured hairs. The perianth (the non-reproductive part of the flower) is 4.5 to 6 millimetres (0.177 to 0.236 in) long and the style is 7.5–9.5 to 5 millimetres (0.295–0.374 to 0.197 in) long. Flowering occurs from September to December and the black fruit that form afterward are more or less egg-shaped, 2 to 3.5 cm (0.79 to 1.38 in) long and 0.9 to 1.3 cm (0.35 to 0.51 in) wide. The two seeds are 1.2 to 2 cm (0.47 to 0.79 in) long and have a narrow wing down one side.

== Taxonomy and naming ==
The horned leaf hakea was first formally described in 1807 by James Edward Smith who gave it the name Conchium ceratophyllum and published the description in Rees's Cyclopædia. The type specimen was collected at King Georges Sound by Archibald Menzies. Smith noted "It is one of the handsomest of its genus". In 1810, Robert Brown changed the name to Hakea ceratophylla. The specific epithet (ceratophylla) is derived from the Ancient Greek words keras, keratos meaning "horn" and phyllon meaning "leaf" apparently referring to the leaves which in some forms have horn-like lobes.

== Distribution ==
The shrub is found in southern areas of Western Australia in the Peel, South West and Great Southern regions of Western Australia where it grows on seasonally damp flats and among granite outcrops in sandy, loamy or gravelly soils. The plants range is from near Perth in the north and south to around Albany and inland to around the Stirling Range area where it grows in heath or Melaleuca woodland communities.
