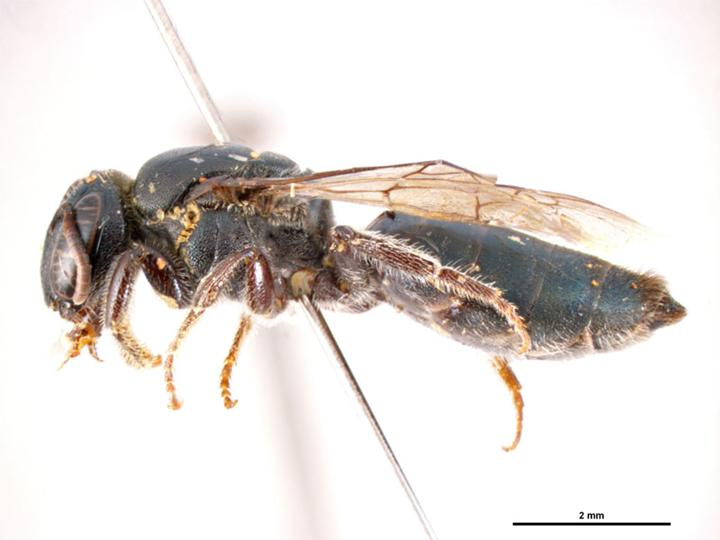
- Female

Scientific classification
- Kingdom: Animalia
- Phylum: Arthropoda
- Clade: Pancrustacea
- Class: Insecta
- Order: Hymenoptera
- Family: Colletidae
- Genus: Euryglossa
- Species: E. tolgae

Binomial name
- Euryglossa tolgae Exley, 1976

= Euryglossa tolgae =

Species of bee

Euryglossa tolgae is a species of bee in the family Colletidae and the subfamily Euryglossinae. It is endemic to Australia. It was described in 1976 by Australian entomologist Elizabeth Exley.

== Distribution and habitat ==
The species occurs in north-eastern Queensland. The type locality is 8 km north of Tolga on the Atherton Tableland. Other published localities include Mareeba and Kuranda.

== Behaviour ==
The adults are flying mellivores. Flowering plants visited by the bees include Eucalyptus, Melaleuca and Tristania species.
