= Tristania =

Tristania may refer to:

- Tristania (band), Norwegian gothic metal band
- Tristania (plant), genus of flowering plants native to Australia
- Tristania, a term applied to the set of stories centered around Sir Tristan
