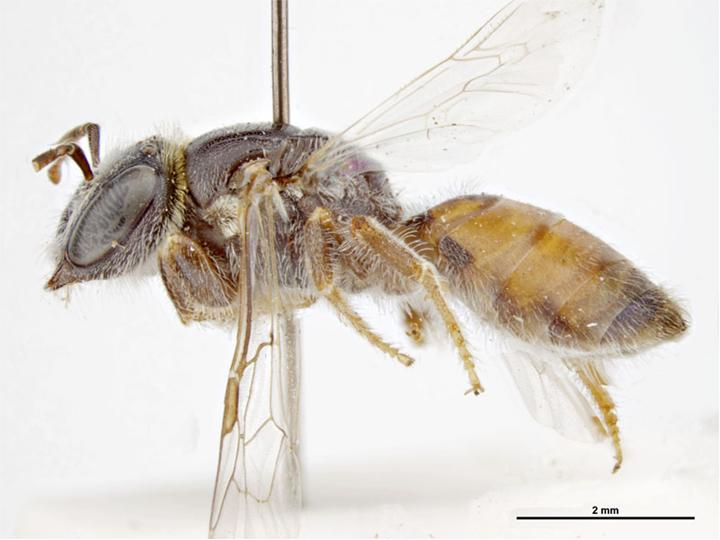
- Female

Scientific classification
- Kingdom: Animalia
- Phylum: Arthropoda
- Clade: Pancrustacea
- Class: Insecta
- Order: Hymenoptera
- Family: Colletidae
- Genus: Euryglossa
- Species: E. rhodochlora

Binomial name
- Euryglossa rhodochlora Cockerell, 1914

= Euryglossa rhodochlora =

Species of bee

Euryglossa rhodochlora is a species of bee in the family Colletidae and the subfamily Euryglossinae. It is endemic to Australia. It was described in 1914 by British-American entomologist Theodore Dru Alison Cockerell.

== Description ==
Body length is 9 mm. Colouration of head, thorax and abdomen is mainly a metallic dark blue-green.

== Distribution and habitat ==
The species occurs in eastern Australia. The type locality is Yarrawin, New South Wales.

== Behaviour ==
The adults are Nectarivores. Flowering plants visited by the bees include Eucalyptus species.

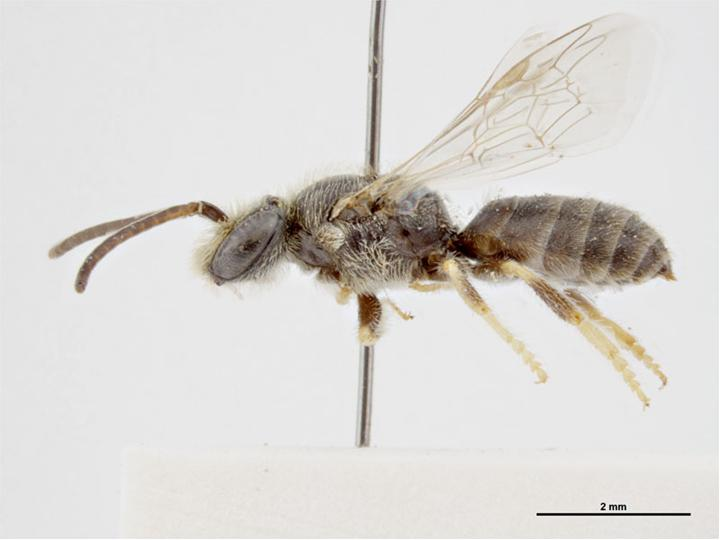
Male
