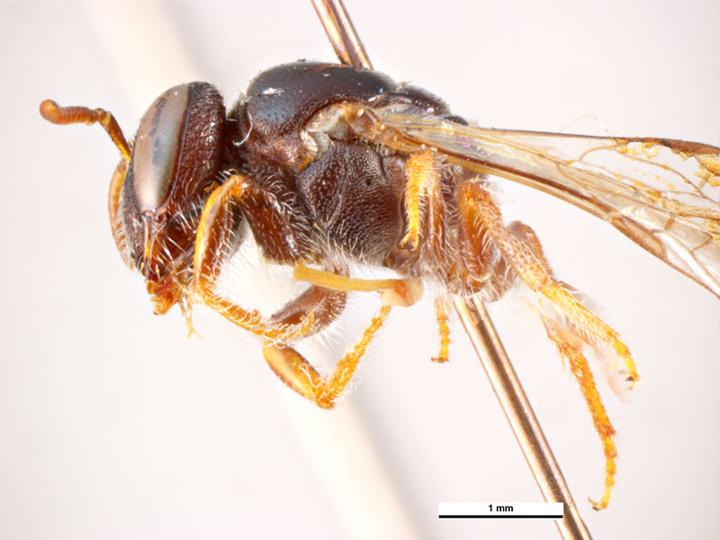
- Female

Scientific classification
- Kingdom: Animalia
- Phylum: Arthropoda
- Clade: Pancrustacea
- Class: Insecta
- Order: Hymenoptera
- Family: Colletidae
- Genus: Euryglossa
- Species: E. glabra

Binomial name
- Euryglossa glabra Exley, 1976

= Euryglossa glabra =

Species of bee

Euryglossa glabra is a species of bee in the family Colletidae and the subfamily Euryglossinae. It is endemic to Australia. It was described in 1976 by Australian entomologist Elizabeth Exley.

== Distribution and habitat ==
The species occurs in inland eastern Australia. The type locality is Morven in Queensland. Other published localities are Charleville and Mungallala in Queensland and Bourke in New South Wales.

== Behaviour ==
The adults are flying mellivores. Flowering plants visited by the bees include Eucalyptus species.
