= Dissoptila crocodora =

Scientific classification
- Domain: Eukaryota
- Kingdom: Animalia
- Phylum: Arthropoda
- Class: Insecta
- Order: Lepidoptera
- Family: Gelechiidae
- Genus: Dissoptila
- Species: D. crocodora

Binomial name
- Dissoptila crocodora Meyrick, 1922

Species of moth

Dissoptila crocodora is a moth in the family Gelechiidae. It was described by Edward Meyrick in 1922. It is found in Peru and Amazonas, Brazil.

The wingspan is 9–10 mm. The forewings are purplish grey with the basal fourth deep ochreous yellow, from where a streak extends along the costa to near the apex, marked with a blackish dash on the costa in the middle, and a longer one at about three-fourths. The discal tufts at one-third are blackish grey. The hindwings are grey.
