= Dissoptila asphaltitis =

Scientific classification
- Domain: Eukaryota
- Kingdom: Animalia
- Phylum: Arthropoda
- Class: Insecta
- Order: Lepidoptera
- Family: Gelechiidae
- Genus: Dissoptila
- Species: D. asphaltitis

Binomial name
- Dissoptila asphaltitis Meyrick, 1914

Species of moth

Dissoptila asphaltitis is a moth in the family Gelechiidae. It was described by Edward Meyrick in 1914. It is found in Guyana.

The wingspan is about 9 mm. The forewings are dark violet grey with a narrow ochreous-yellow fascia near the base, with projections outwards on the costa and in the disc, anteriorly blackish edged on the costa and with two blackish tufts rather obliquely placed in the disc about one-third. The hindwings are dark grey.
