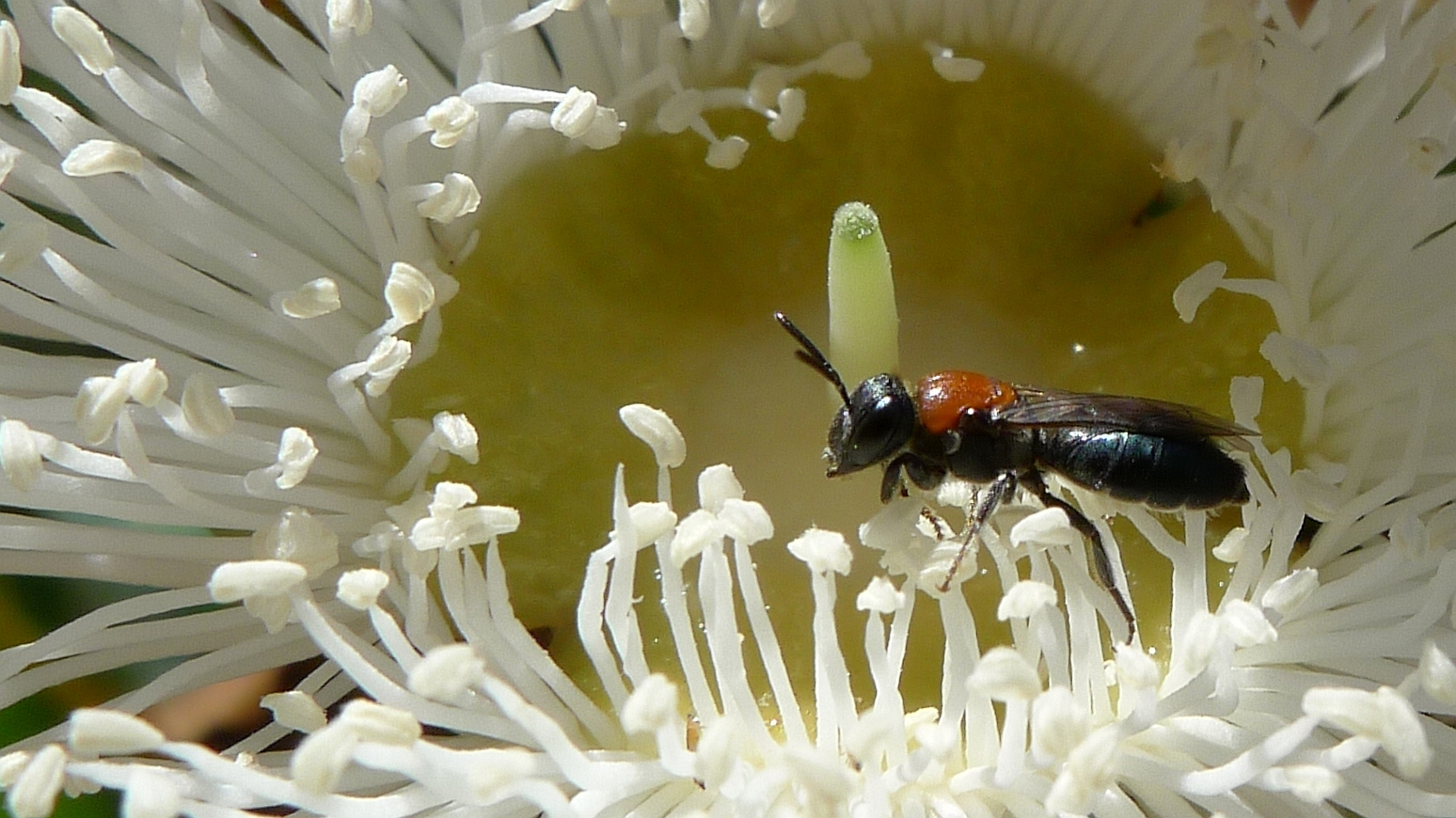
- Euryglossa sp.

Scientific classification
- Kingdom: Animalia
- Phylum: Arthropoda
- Class: Insecta
- Order: Hymenoptera
- Family: Colletidae
- Genus: Euryglossa; Smith, 1853

= Euryglossa (bee) =

Genus of bees

Euryglossa is a genus of bees belonging to the family Colletidae and subfamily Euryglossinae. The species are found in Australia, in all states and territories. The genus was extensively revised in 1976 by Australian entomologist Elizabeth Exley.

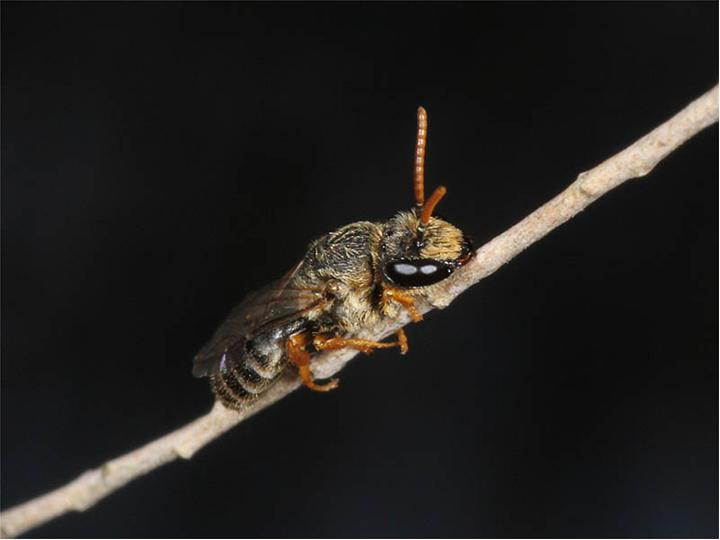
Euryglossa adelaidae

== Species ==
There are about 37 species:

- Euryglossa adelaidae Cockerell, 1905
- Euryglossa alincia Exley, 1976
- Euryglossa angelesi Exley, 1976
- Euryglossa antennata (Rayment, 1935)
- Euryglossa aureopilosa Rayment, 1935
- Euryglossa calaina Exley, 1976
- Euryglossa capitata Exley, 1976
- Euryglossa cupreochalybea Smith, 1853
- Euryglossa depressa Smith, 1853
- Euryglossa edwardsii Cockerell, 1907
- Euryglossa ephippiata Smith, 1862
- Euryglossa frenchii Cockerell, 1910
- Euryglossa glabra Exley, 1976
- Euryglossa haematura Cockerell, 1911
- Euryglossa hardyi Exley, 1976
- Euryglossa homora Exley, 1976
- Euryglossa jucunda Smith, 1879
- Euryglossa laevigatum (Smith, 1879)
- Euryglossa limata Exley, 1976
- Euryglossa liopa Exley, 1976
- Euryglossa millstreamensis Exley, 1976
- Euryglossa myrrhina Exley, 1976
- Euryglossa nigrocaerulea Cockerell, 1913
- Euryglossa noosae Exley, 1976
- Euryglossa pammicta Exley, 1976
- Euryglossa pavonura Cockerell, 1910
- Euryglossa politifrons Cockerell, 1922
- Euryglossa rhodochlora Cockerell, 1914
- Euryglossa rubricata Smith, 1879
- Euryglossa salaris Cockerell, 1910
- Euryglossa schomburgki Cockerell, 1910
- Euryglossa subfusa Cockerell, 1910
- Euryglossa subsericea Cockerell, 1905
- Euryglossa terminata Smith, 1853
- Euryglossa tolgae Exley, 1976
- Euryglossa trichoda Exley, 1976
- Euryglossa victoriae Cockerell, 1910
