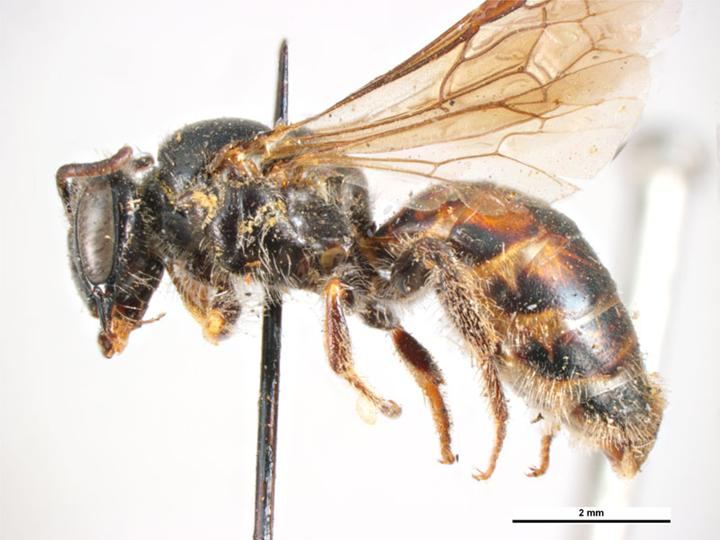
- Female

Scientific classification
- Kingdom: Animalia
- Phylum: Arthropoda
- Clade: Pancrustacea
- Class: Insecta
- Order: Hymenoptera
- Family: Colletidae
- Genus: Euryglossa
- Species: E. pammicta

Binomial name
- Euryglossa pammicta Exley, 1976

= Euryglossa pammicta =

Species of bee

Euryglossa pammicta is a species of bee in the family Colletidae and the subfamily Euryglossinae. It is endemic to Australia. It was described in 1976 by Australian entomologist Elizabeth Exley.

== Distribution and habitat ==
The species occurs in South Australia and Western Australia. The type locality is Oodla Wirra, 259 km north of Adelaide. Other published localities include Eucla, Coolgardie and Booanya in Western Australia.

== Behaviour ==
The adults are flying mellivores. Flowering plants visited by the bees include Eucalyptus species.
