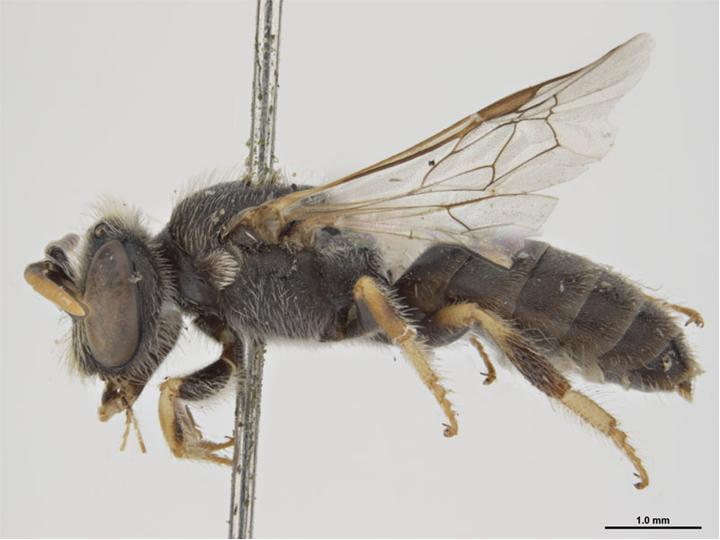
- Male

Scientific classification
- Kingdom: Animalia
- Phylum: Arthropoda
- Clade: Pancrustacea
- Class: Insecta
- Order: Hymenoptera
- Family: Colletidae
- Genus: Euryglossa
- Species: E. victoriae

Binomial name
- Euryglossa victoriae Cockerell, 1910

Synonyms
- Euryglossidia murrayensis Rayment, 1935; Euryglossa rhodochlora scutellata Rayment, 1939

= Euryglossa victoriae =

Species of bee

Euryglossa victoriae is a species of bee in the family Colletidae and the subfamily Euryglossinae. It is endemic to Australia. It was described in 1910 by British-American entomologist Theodore Dru Alison Cockerell.

== Description ==
Body length is 10 mm. The head and thorax are black; the abdomen is broad and flattened, olive-green and red.

== Distribution and habitat ==
The species occurs in southern Australia. Published localities include Gunbower and Wyperfeld National Park in Victoria and the vicinity of Eucla in South Australia.

== Behaviour ==
The adults are flying mellivores. Flowering plants visited by the bees include Eucalyptus species.

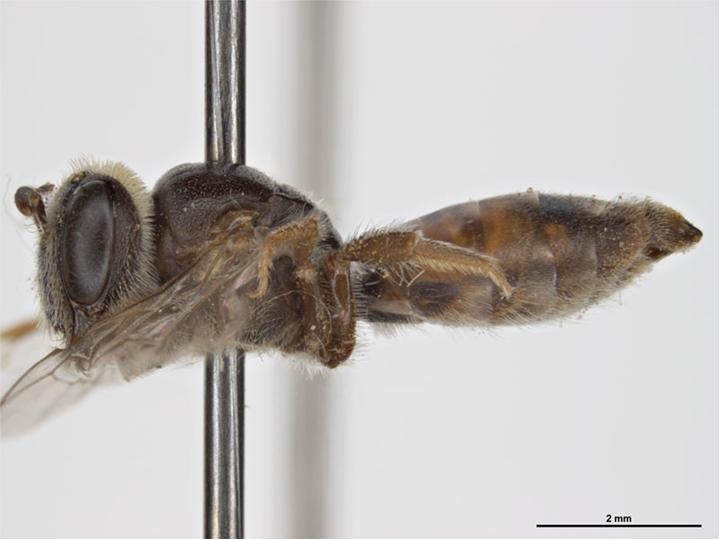
Female
