= Euryglossa antennata =

Scientific classification
- Kingdom: Animalia
- Phylum: Arthropoda
- Clade: Pancrustacea
- Class: Insecta
- Order: Hymenoptera
- Family: Colletidae
- Genus: Euryglossa
- Species: E. antennata

Binomial name
- Euryglossa antennata (Rayment, 1935)

Synonyms
- Euryglossimorpha antennata Rayment, 1935

Species of bee

Euryglossa antennata is a species of bee in the family Colletidae and the subfamily Euryglossinae. It is endemic to Australia. It was described in 1935 by Australian entomologist Tarlton Rayment.

== Description ==
Body length is 7 mm. The head, thorax and abdomen are black.

== Distribution and habitat ==
The species occurs in Western Australia. The type locality is the Wongan Hills in the Wheatbelt. It has also been recorded from Mingenew.

== Behaviour ==
The adults are flying mellivores.
