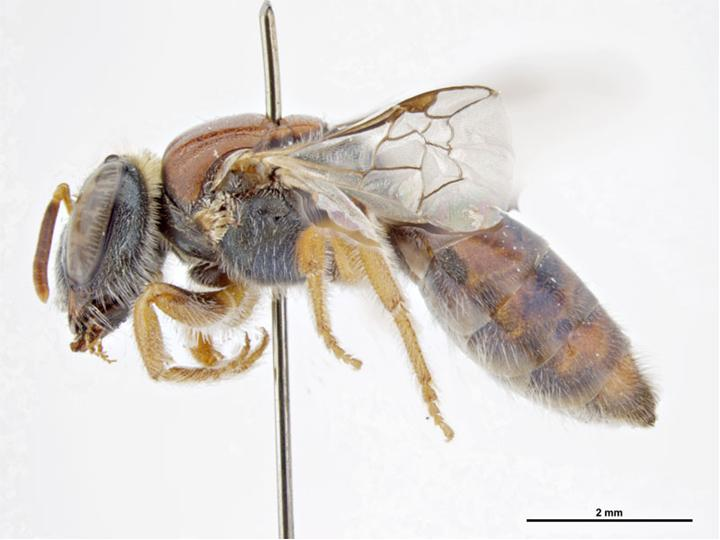
- Female

Scientific classification
- Kingdom: Animalia
- Phylum: Arthropoda
- Clade: Pancrustacea
- Class: Insecta
- Order: Hymenoptera
- Family: Colletidae
- Genus: Euryglossa
- Species: E. millstreamensis

Binomial name
- Euryglossa millstreamensis Exley, 1976

= Euryglossa millstreamensis =

Species of bee

Euryglossa millstreamensis is a species of bee in the family Colletidae and the subfamily Euryglossinae that was described in 1976 by Australian entomologist Elizabeth Exley. It is endemic to Australia.

== Distribution and habitat ==
The species occurs in Western Australia. The type locality is Millstream Station in the Pilbara region.

== Behaviour ==
The adults are flying mellivores. Flowering plants visited by the bees include Eucalyptus species.

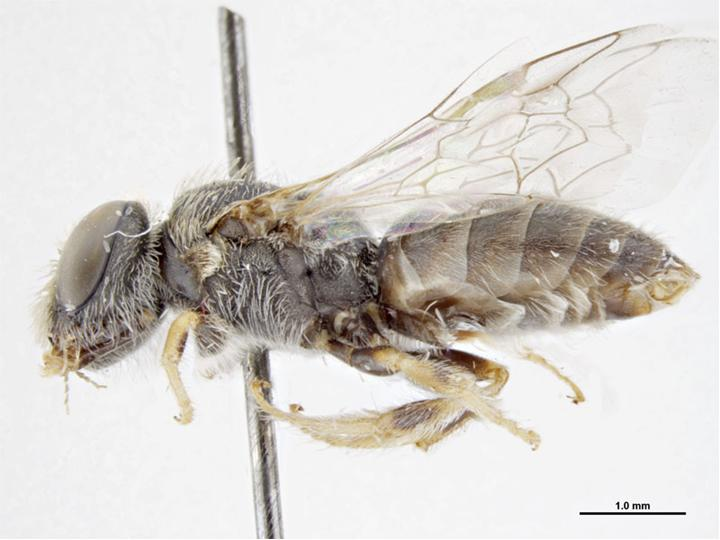
Male
