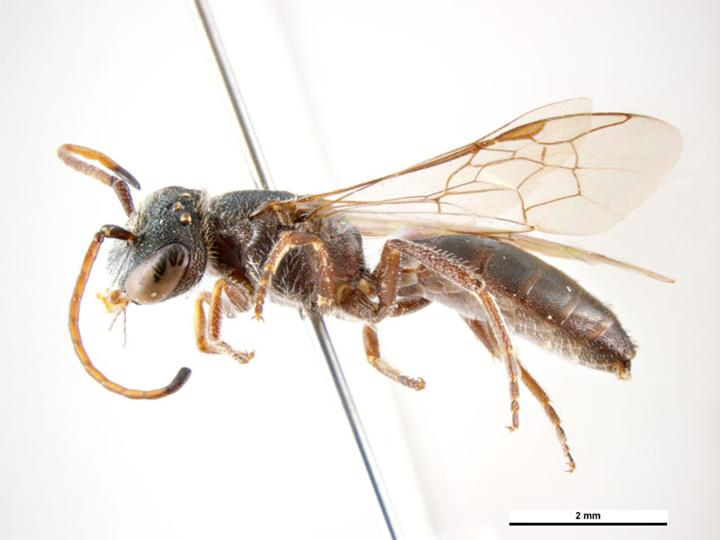
- Male

Scientific classification
- Kingdom: Animalia
- Phylum: Arthropoda
- Clade: Pancrustacea
- Class: Insecta
- Order: Hymenoptera
- Family: Colletidae
- Genus: Euryglossa
- Species: E. capitata

Binomial name
- Euryglossa capitata Exley, 1976

= Euryglossa capitata =

Species of bee

Euryglossa capitata is a species of bee in the family Colletidae and the subfamily Euryglossinae. It is endemic to Australia. It was described in 1976 by Australian entomologist Elizabeth Exley.

== Distribution and habitat ==
The species occurs in New South Wales. The type locality is Mount Wilson in the Blue Mountains. Other published localities include Mount Victoria and Gosford.

== Behaviour ==
The adults are flying mellivores.

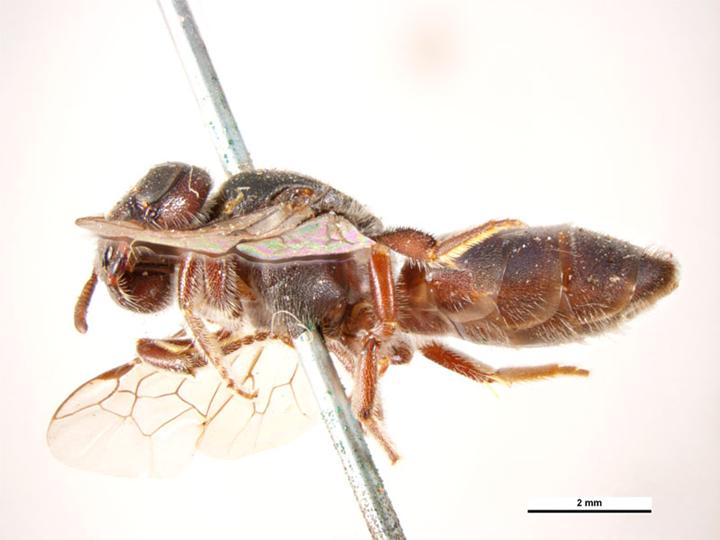
Female
