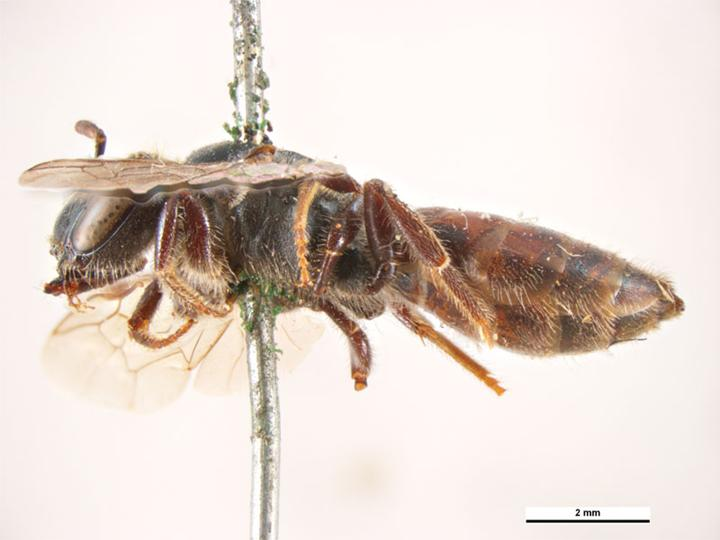
- Female

Scientific classification
- Kingdom: Animalia
- Phylum: Arthropoda
- Clade: Pancrustacea
- Class: Insecta
- Order: Hymenoptera
- Family: Colletidae
- Genus: Euryglossa
- Species: E. depressa

Binomial name
- Euryglossa depressa Smith, 1853

Synonyms
- Euryglossa bicolor Smith, 1862; Euryglossa occipitalis Cockerell, 1922; Euryglossa longicornis Cockerell, 1922

= Euryglossa depressa =

Species of bee

Euryglossa depressa is a species of bee in the family Colletidae and the subfamily Euryglossinae. It is endemic to Australia. It was described in 1853 by English entomologist Frederick Smith. It was extensively synonymised in 1976 by Australian entomologist Elizabeth Exley.

== Description ==
Body length is 9 mm. Head and thorax are glossy black, the abdomen a satiny dark green.

== Distribution and habitat ==
The species occurs in eastern Australia. Published localities include Adelaide, Portland in Victoria, and Kelvin Grove in Brisbane.

== Behaviour ==
The adults are flying mellivores. Flowering plants visited by the bees include Eucalyptus and Leptospermum species.
