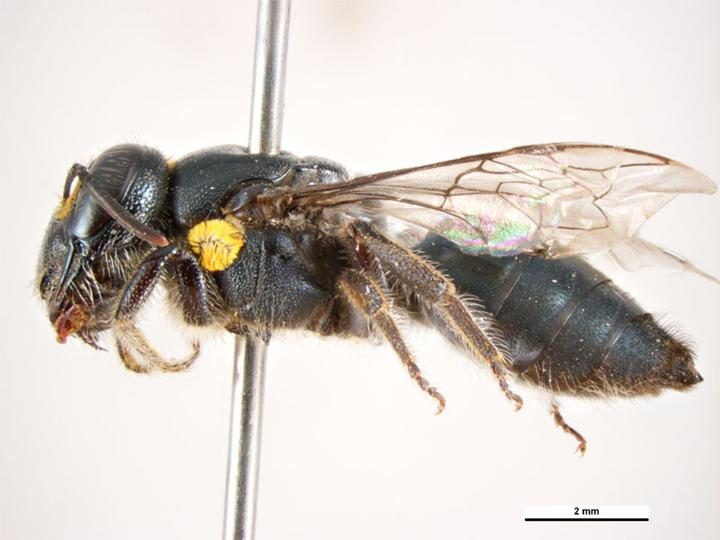
- Female

Scientific classification
- Kingdom: Animalia
- Phylum: Arthropoda
- Clade: Pancrustacea
- Class: Insecta
- Order: Hymenoptera
- Family: Colletidae
- Genus: Euryglossa
- Species: E. aureopilosa

Binomial name
- Euryglossa aureopilosa (Rayment, 1935)

Synonyms
- Euryglossimorpha aureomaculata Rayment, 1949

= Euryglossa aureopilosa =

Species of bee

Euryglossa aureopilosa is a species of bee in the family Colletidae and the subfamily Euryglossinae. It is endemic to Australia. It was described in 1935 by Australian entomologist Tarlton Rayment.

== Description ==
Body length is 10 mm. The head and thorax are black, the abdomen greenish.

== Distribution and habitat ==
The species occurs in south-eastern Australia. The type locality is Gosford in New South Wales. It has been recorded from Mount Keira as well as from Mount Macedon in Victoria.

== Behaviour ==
The adults are flying mellivores. They may nest in termite mounds. Flowering plants visited by the bees include Angophora species.
