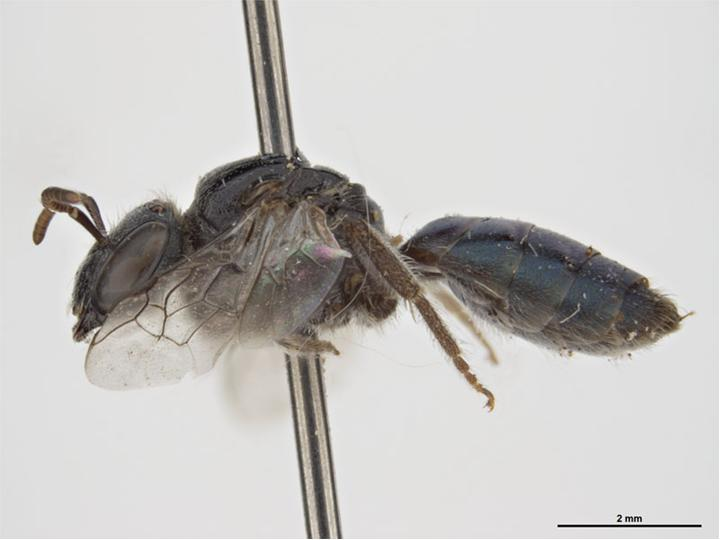
- Female

Scientific classification
- Kingdom: Animalia
- Phylum: Arthropoda
- Clade: Pancrustacea
- Class: Insecta
- Order: Hymenoptera
- Family: Colletidae
- Genus: Euryglossa
- Species: E. jucunda

Binomial name
- Euryglossa jucunda Smith, 1879

= Euryglossa jucunda =

Species of bee

Euryglossa jucunda is a species of bee in the family Colletidae and the subfamily Euryglossinae. It is endemic to Australia. It was described in 1879 by English entomologist Frederick Smith.

== Description ==
Body length is 8 mm. Head and thorax are glossy black, the abdomen mainly blue or blue-green.

== Distribution and habitat ==
The species occurs in south-western Australia. Published localities include Geraldton, Perth and Gnowangerup, as well as in the vicinity of Eucla.

== Behaviour ==
The adults are flying mellivores. Flowering plants visited by the bees include Eucalyptus species.
