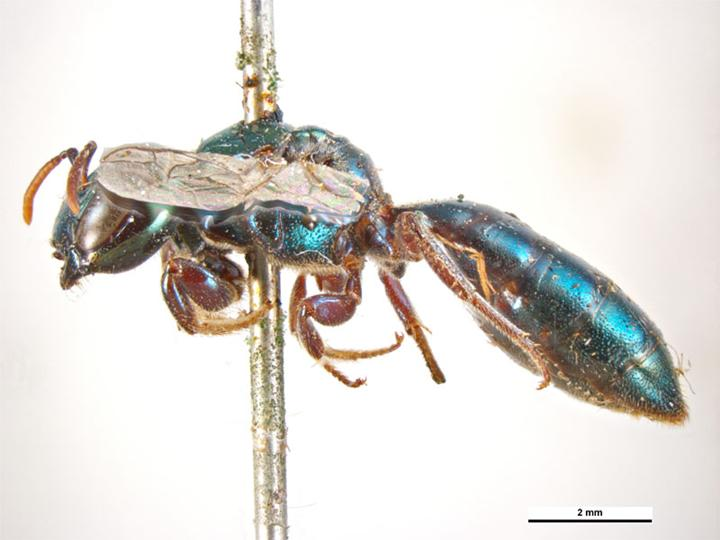
- Female

Scientific classification
- Kingdom: Animalia
- Phylum: Arthropoda
- Clade: Pancrustacea
- Class: Insecta
- Order: Hymenoptera
- Family: Colletidae
- Genus: Euryglossa
- Species: E. laevigatum

Binomial name
- Euryglossa laevigatum (Smith, 1879)

Synonyms
- Stilpnosoma laevigatum Smith, 1879; Stilpnosoma turneri Friese, 1917

= Euryglossa laevigatum =

Species of bee

Euryglossa laevigatum is a species of bee in the family Colletidae and the subfamily Euryglossinae. It is endemic to Australia. It was described in 1879 by English entomologist Frederick Smith.

== Description ==
Body length is 10 mm. Head and thorax are bright green, the abdomen dark blue-green and glossy.

== Distribution and habitat ==
The species occurs in eastern Australia. Published localities include Mackay and Colosseum in Queensland, and Adelaide in South Australia.

== Behaviour ==
The adults are flying mellivores. Flowering plants visited by the bees include Leptospermum species.

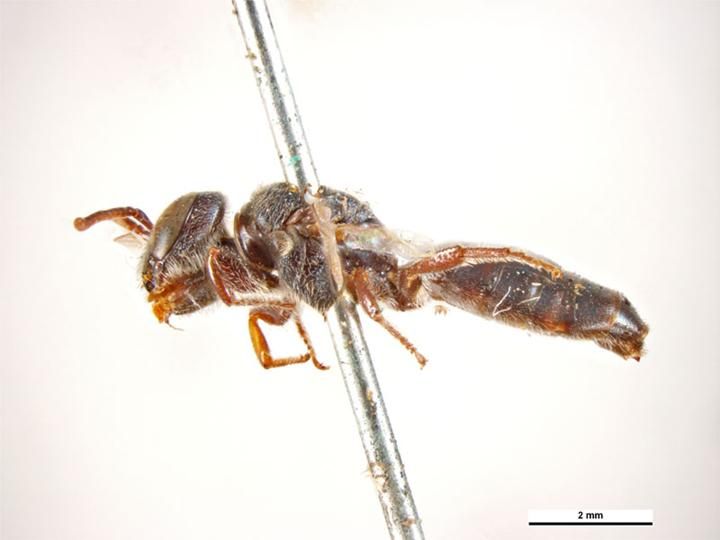
Male
