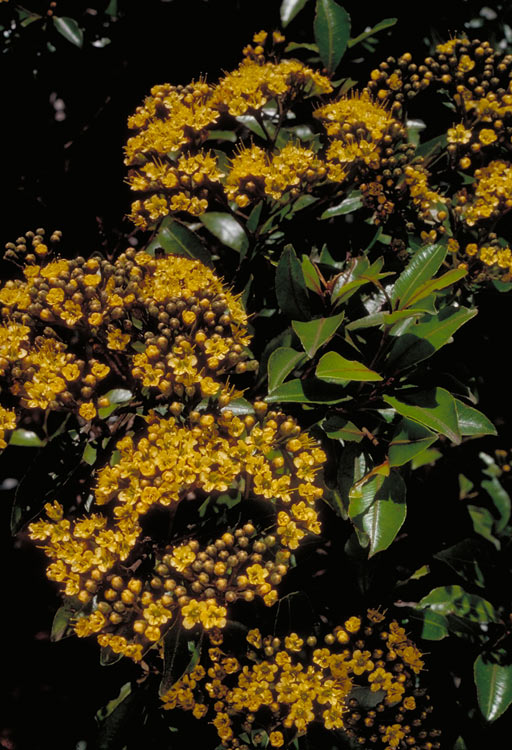

Conservation status
- Least Concern (NCA)

Scientific classification
- Kingdom: Plantae
- Clade: Tracheophytes
- Clade: Angiosperms
- Clade: Eudicots
- Clade: Rosids
- Order: Myrtales
- Family: Myrtaceae
- Genus: Thaleropia
- Species: T. queenslandica

Binomial name
- Thaleropia queenslandica (L.S.Sm.) Peter G. Wilson

Synonyms
- Metrosideros queenslandica L.S.Sm.

= Thaleropia queenslandica =

Species of plant

Thaleropia queenslandica is a species of tree in the family Myrtaceae.

== Description ==
Thaleropia queenslandica can grow to be up to 45 metres in height. The leaves are shiny with somewhat crenulate margins, the inflorescence much-branched with orange and yellow flowers. It flowers in summer and fruits in autumn. It produces dry, dehiscent fruit with a capsule fruit structure.

== Habitat and distribution ==
It grows primarily in the Atherton Tableland and nearby rainforest areas at an altitude of 800 to 1200 metres, with an isolated population recorded in Mount Mellum.

== Conservation ==
It has been assessed as Least Concern under the Nature Conservation Act 1992.
