= Dissoptila =

Scientific classification
- Domain: Eukaryota
- Kingdom: Animalia
- Phylum: Arthropoda
- Class: Insecta
- Order: Lepidoptera
- Family: Gelechiidae
- Subfamily: Gelechiinae
- Genus: Dissoptila; Meyrick, 1914

Genus of moths

Dissoptila is a genus of moths in the family Gelechiidae.

== Species ==
- Dissoptila asphaltitis Meyrick, 1914
- Dissoptila crocodora Meyrick, 1922
- Dissoptila disrupta Meyrick, 1914
- Dissoptila mutabilis Meyrick, 1914
- Dissoptila prozona Meyrick, 1914
