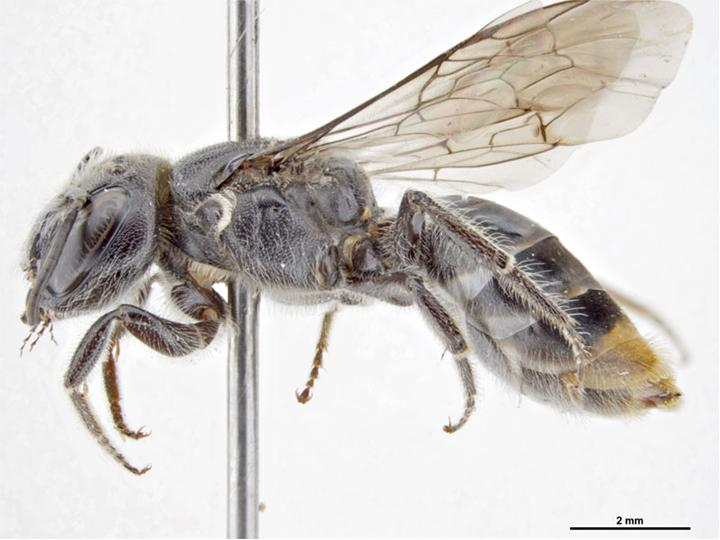
- Female

Scientific classification
- Kingdom: Animalia
- Phylum: Arthropoda
- Clade: Pancrustacea
- Class: Insecta
- Order: Hymenoptera
- Family: Colletidae
- Genus: Euryglossa
- Species: E. terminata

Binomial name
- Euryglossa terminata Smith, 1853

Synonyms
- Euryglossimorpha ruficauda Rayment, 1948

= Euryglossa terminata =

Species of bee

Euryglossa terminata is a species of bee in the family Colletidae and the subfamily Euryglossinae. It is endemic to Australia. It was described in 1853 by English entomologist Frederick Smith.

== Description ==
Body length is 8 mm. Head and thorax are glossy black, the abdomen mainly black with the fifth segment bright fulvous.

== Distribution and habitat ==
The species occurs in eastern Australia. Published localities include Brisbane and Emu Vale in Queensland, and Patonga and Manning Valley in New South Wales.

== Behaviour ==
The adults are flying mellivores. Flowering plants visited by the bees include Eucalyptus species.
