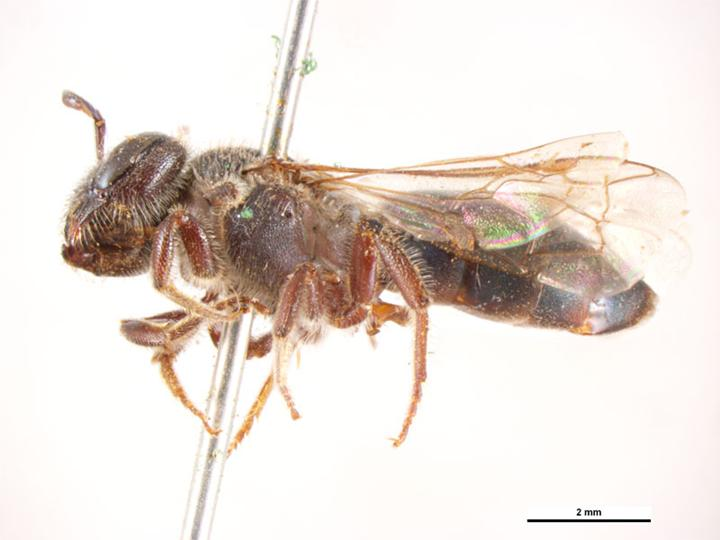
- Female

Scientific classification
- Kingdom: Animalia
- Phylum: Arthropoda
- Clade: Pancrustacea
- Class: Insecta
- Order: Hymenoptera
- Family: Colletidae
- Genus: Euryglossa
- Species: E. nigrocaerulea

Binomial name
- Euryglossa nigrocaerulea Cockerell, 1913

Synonyms
- Euryglossa nubilipennis Cockerell, 1914; Euryglossa depressa extrema Rayment, 1935; Euryglossimorpha proxima Rayment, 1935; Euryglossidia punctata Rayment, 1935

= Euryglossa nigrocaerulea =

Species of bee

Euryglossa nigrocaerulea is a species of bee in the family Colletidae and the subfamily Euryglossinae. It is endemic to Australia. It was described in 1913 by British-American entomologist Theodore Dru Alison Cockerell. It was extensively synonymised in 1976 by Australian entomologist Elizabeth Exley.

== Description ==
Body length is 9 mm. The head and thorax are black; the abdomen dark blue.

== Distribution and habitat ==
The species occurs in eastern Australia. The type locality is Croydon, Victoria.

== Behaviour ==
The adults are flying mellivores. Flowering plants visited by the bees include Eucalyptus, Leptospermum and Melaleuca.

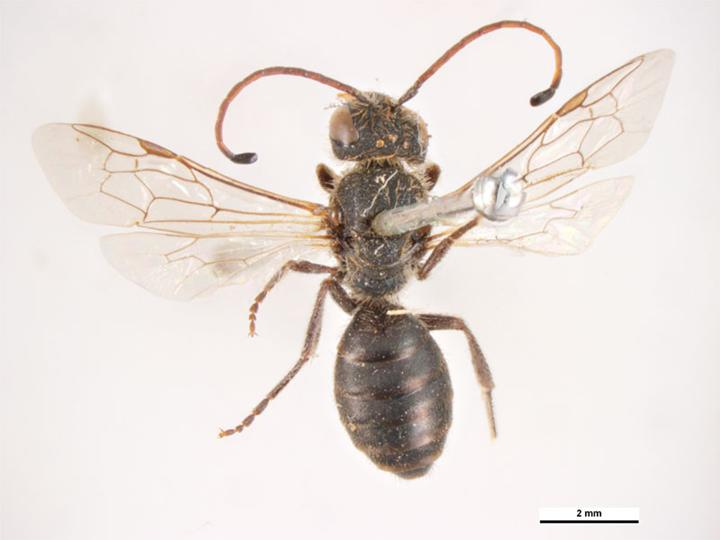
Male
