= Dissoptila prozona =

Scientific classification
- Domain: Eukaryota
- Kingdom: Animalia
- Phylum: Arthropoda
- Class: Insecta
- Order: Lepidoptera
- Family: Gelechiidae
- Genus: Dissoptila
- Species: D. prozona

Binomial name
- Dissoptila prozona Meyrick, 1914

Species of moth

Dissoptila prozona is a moth in the family Gelechiidae. It was described by Edward Meyrick in 1914. It is found in Guyana.

The wingspan is about 7 mm. The forewings are rather dark fuscous, with a faint purplish tinge and a broad whitish-ochreous fascia near the base, the edges are straight. There are two large blackish tufts rather obliquely placed in the disc at one-third and a whitish-ochreous dot on the middle of the costa, one in the disc rather beyond this, and an inwardly oblique strigula from the costa at two-thirds, as well as a slender somewhat incurved whitish-ochreous fascia from three-fourths of the costa to the tornus, narrowly interrupted in the middle and with narrow projections inwards on each side of this. The hindwings are dark grey, subhyaline (almost glass like) in the disc anteriorly.
