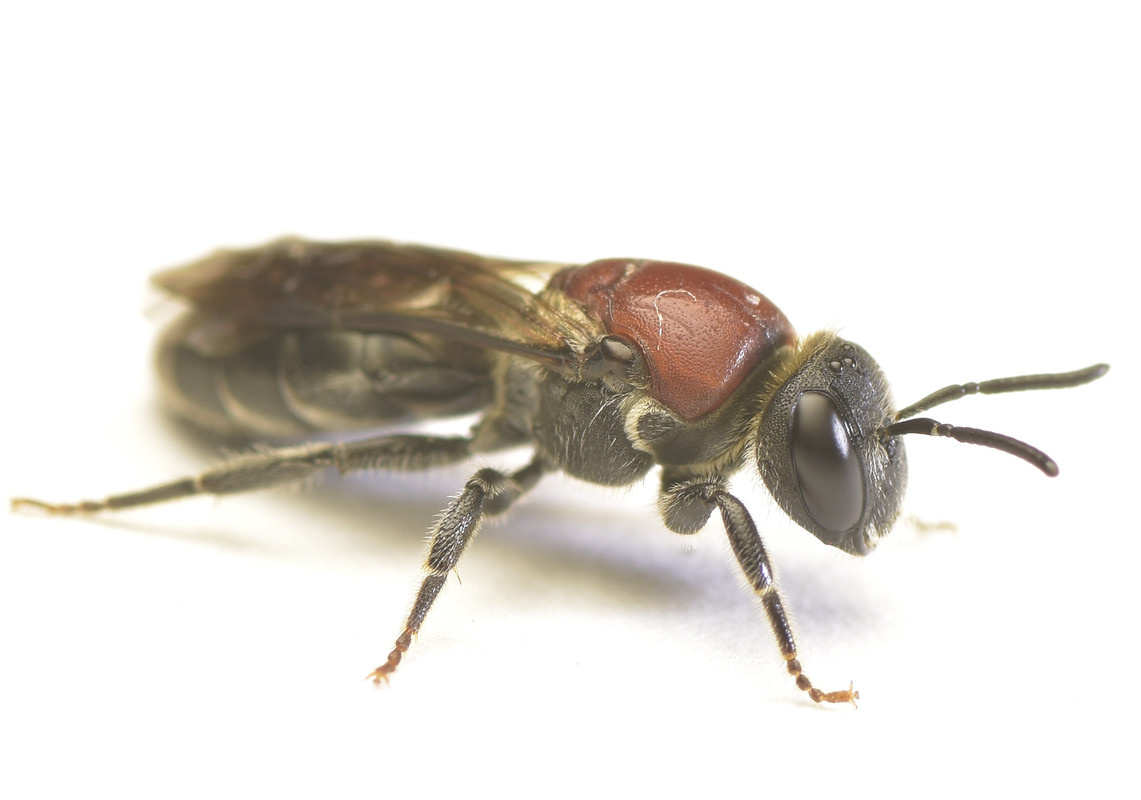

Scientific classification
- Kingdom: Animalia
- Phylum: Arthropoda
- Clade: Pancrustacea
- Class: Insecta
- Order: Hymenoptera
- Family: Colletidae
- Genus: Euryglossa
- Species: E. ephippiata

Binomial name
- Euryglossa ephippiata Smith, 1862

Synonyms
- Euryglossa nigra Smith, 1879; Euryglossa (Euryglossimorpha) cincticornis Cockerell, 1913; Euryglossa polysticta Cockerell, 1922; Euryglossa aurescens obscura Cockerell, 1929

= Euryglossa ephippiata =

Species of bee

Euryglossa ephippiata, also known as the red-saddled broad-tongue, is a species of bee in the family Colletidae and the subfamily Euryglossinae. It is endemic to Australia. It was described in 1862 by English entomologist Frederick Smith. It was extensively synonymised in 1976 by Australian entomologist Elizabeth Exley.

== Description ==
Body length is 10 mm. The head is black, the thorax blood-red above, the abdomen dark olive-green.

== Distribution and habitat ==
The species occurs in eastern Australia from Queensland southwards to Tasmania.

== Behaviour ==
The adults are flying mellivores with sedentary larvae. They nest in soil. Flowering plants visited by the bees include Angophora, Bursaria, Callistemon, Cotoneaster, Eucalyptus, Jacksonia, Leptospermum, Leucopogon and Melaleuca species.

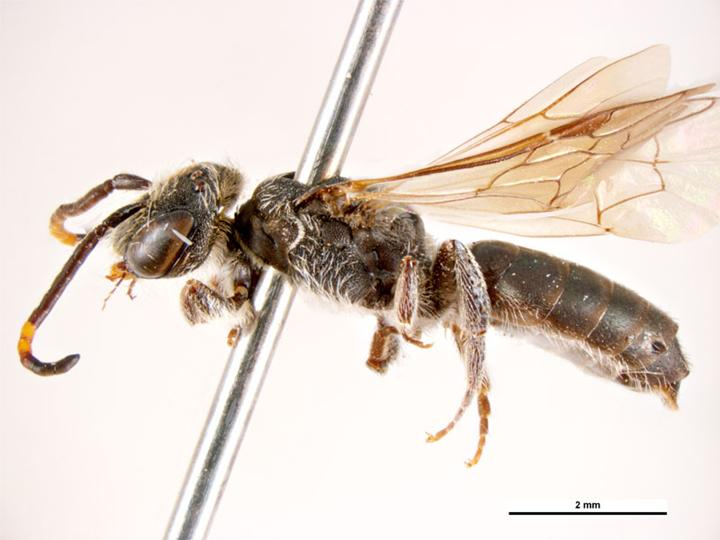
Male
