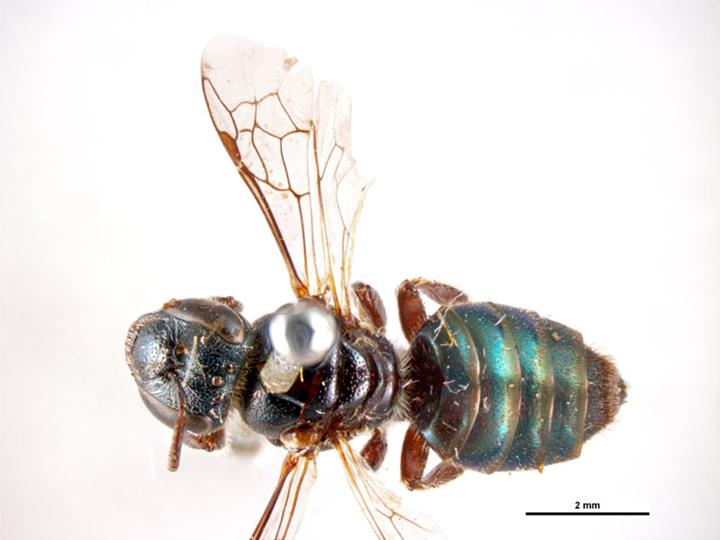
- Female

Scientific classification
- Kingdom: Animalia
- Phylum: Arthropoda
- Clade: Pancrustacea
- Class: Insecta
- Order: Hymenoptera
- Family: Colletidae
- Genus: Euryglossa
- Species: E. schomburgki

Binomial name
- Euryglossa schomburgki Cockerell, 1910

Synonyms
- Euryglossa tenuicornis Cockerell, 1913

= Euryglossa schomburgki =

Species of bee

Euryglossa schomburgki is a species of bee in the family Colletidae and the subfamily Euryglossinae. It is endemic to Australia. It was described in 1910 by British-American entomologist Theodore Dru Alison Cockerell.

== Description ==
Body length is 9 mm. The head and thorax are black; the abdomen is bluish-green.

== Distribution and habitat ==
The species occurs in Western Australia and South Australia. The type locality is Adelaide.

== Behaviour ==
The adults are flying mellivores. Flowering plants visited by the bees include Eucalyptus species.
