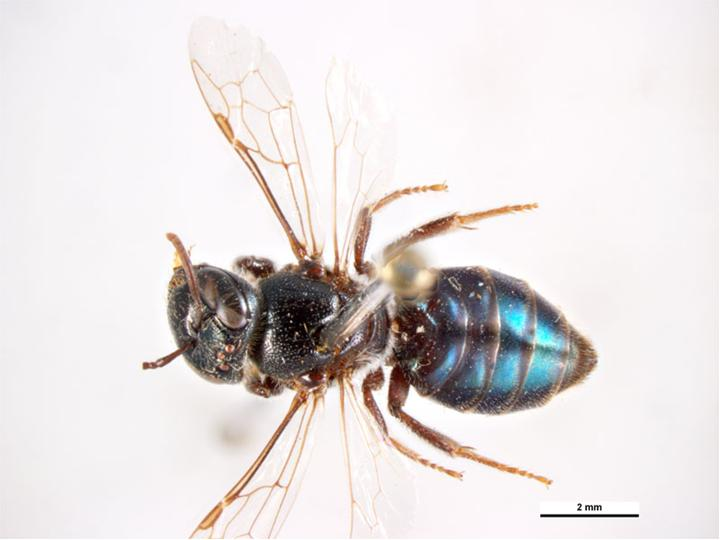
- Female

Scientific classification
- Kingdom: Animalia
- Phylum: Arthropoda
- Clade: Pancrustacea
- Class: Insecta
- Order: Hymenoptera
- Family: Colletidae
- Genus: Euryglossa
- Species: E. pavonura

Binomial name
- Euryglossa pavonura Cockerell, 1910

= Euryglossa pavonura =

Species of bee

Euryglossa pavonura is a species of bee in the family Colletidae and the subfamily Euryglossinae. It is endemic to Australia. It was described in 1910 by British-American entomologist Theodore Dru Alison Cockerell.

== Description ==
Body length is 10 mm. Head and thorax are black and glossy with a metallic sheen, the abdomen a "brilliant peacock-green, with varying shades, bluer and yellower". The whole is summarised by Cockerell as: "A very distinct and beautiful species."

== Distribution and habitat ==
The species occurs in Far North Queensland. The type locality is Cooktown. It has also been recorded from Prince of Wales Island in Torres Strait.

== Behaviour ==
The adults are flying mellivores.
