= Dissoptila disrupta =

Scientific classification
- Domain: Eukaryota
- Kingdom: Animalia
- Phylum: Arthropoda
- Class: Insecta
- Order: Lepidoptera
- Family: Gelechiidae
- Genus: Dissoptila
- Species: D. disrupta

Binomial name
- Dissoptila disrupta Meyrick, 1914

Species of moth

Dissoptila disrupta is a moth in the family Gelechiidae. It was described by Edward Meyrick in 1914. It is found in Guyana.

The wingspan is 9–10 mm. The forewings are ochreous whitish or pale whitish ochreous with three cloudy grey spots on the anterior half of the costa and a patch from beyond the middle to near the apex. Other markings are formed of black irroration (sprinkling), namely four irregular patches along the dorsum, several irregular variable spots in the disc between the base and the middle, an elongate patch or streak margining the posterior costal patch beneath, and a streak along the upper part of the termen. The hindwings are dark grey, thinly scaled in the disc anteriorly.
