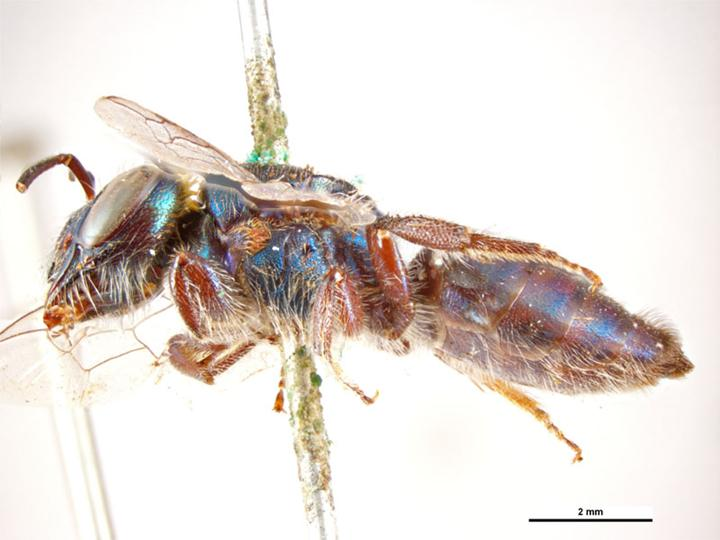
- Female

Scientific classification
- Kingdom: Animalia
- Phylum: Arthropoda
- Clade: Pancrustacea
- Class: Insecta
- Order: Hymenoptera
- Family: Colletidae
- Genus: Euryglossa
- Species: E. calaina

Binomial name
- Euryglossa calaina Exley, 1976

= Euryglossa calaina =

Species of bee

Euryglossa calaina is a species of bee in the family Colletidae and the subfamily Euryglossinae. It is endemic to Australia. It was described in 1976 by Australian entomologist Elizabeth Exley.

== Distribution and habitat ==
The species occurs in south-west Western Australia. The type locality is Cranbrook. Other published localities include Dudinin and Borden National Park.

== Behaviour ==
The adults are flying mellivores.
