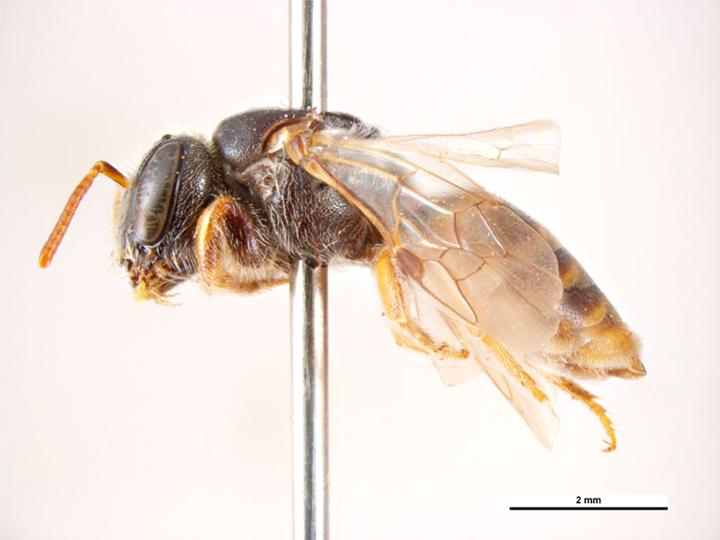
- Female

Scientific classification
- Kingdom: Animalia
- Phylum: Arthropoda
- Clade: Pancrustacea
- Class: Insecta
- Order: Hymenoptera
- Family: Colletidae
- Genus: Euryglossa
- Species: E. frenchii

Binomial name
- Euryglossa frenchii Cockerell, 1910

= Euryglossa frenchii =

Species of bee

Euryglossa frenchii is a species of bee in the family Colletidae and the subfamily Euryglossinae. It is endemic to Australia. It was described in 1910 by British-American entomologist Theodore Dru Alison Cockerell.

== Distribution and habitat ==
The species occurs in south-eastern Australia. Localities where it has been recorded include Broken Hill and Wentworth in New South Wales, Hattah in Victoria, and Mount Serle and Golden Grove in South Australia.

== Behaviour ==
The adults are flying mellivores. Flowering plants visited by the bees include Eucalyptus species.

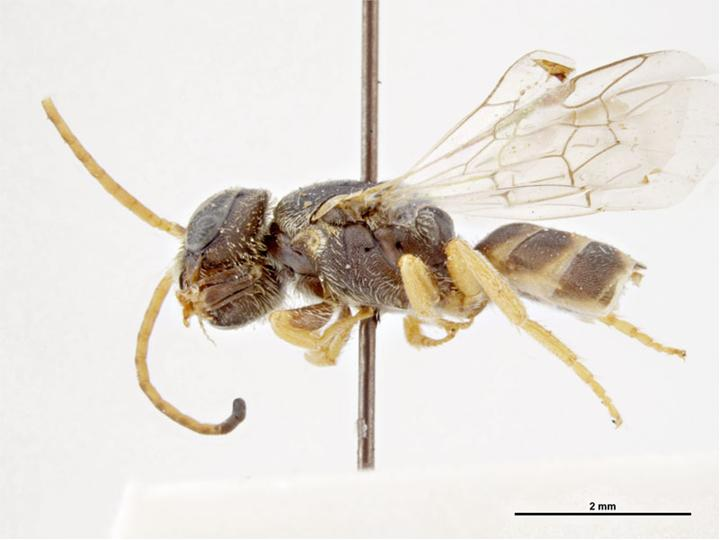
Male
