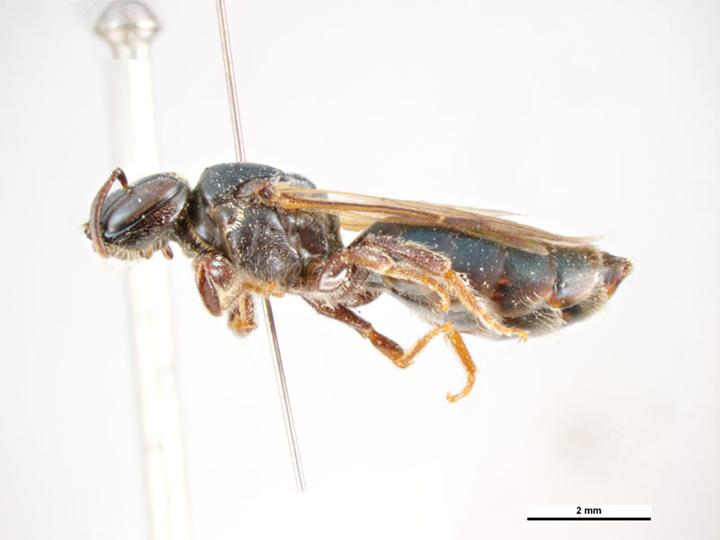
- Female

Scientific classification
- Kingdom: Animalia
- Phylum: Arthropoda
- Clade: Pancrustacea
- Class: Insecta
- Order: Hymenoptera
- Family: Colletidae
- Genus: Euryglossa
- Species: E. noosae

Binomial name
- Euryglossa noosae Exley, 1976

= Euryglossa noosae =

Species of bee

Euryglossa noosae is a species of bee in the family Colletidae and the subfamily Euryglossinae. It is endemic to Australia. It was described in 1976 by Australian entomologist Elizabeth Exley.

== Distribution and habitat ==
The species occurs in south-eastern Queensland. The type locality is Noosa on the Sunshine Coast.

== Behaviour ==
The adults are flying mellivores. Flowering plants visited by the bees include Eucalyptus and Eugenia species.
