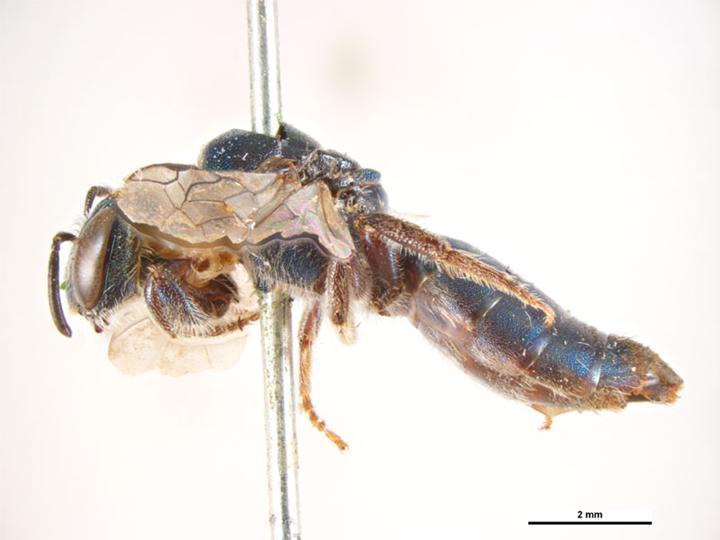
- Female

Scientific classification
- Kingdom: Animalia
- Phylum: Arthropoda
- Clade: Pancrustacea
- Class: Insecta
- Order: Hymenoptera
- Family: Colletidae
- Genus: Euryglossa
- Species: E. cupreochalybea

Binomial name
- Euryglossa cupreochalybea Smith, 1853

= Euryglossa cupreochalybea =

Species of bee

Euryglossa cupreochalybea is a species of bee in the family Colletidae and the subfamily Euryglossinae. It is endemic to Australia. It was described in 1853 by English entomologist Frederick Smith.

== Description ==
Body length is 8 mm. Head and thorax are glossy black, the abdomen steel blue.

== Distribution and habitat ==
The species occurs in south-west Western Australia. Published localities include Yallingup, Gnowangerup, Merredin and Cranbrook.

== Behaviour ==
The adults are flying mellivores.
