= Euryglossa alincia =

Scientific classification
- Kingdom: Animalia
- Phylum: Arthropoda
- Clade: Pancrustacea
- Class: Insecta
- Order: Hymenoptera
- Family: Colletidae
- Genus: Euryglossa
- Species: E. alincia

Binomial name
- Euryglossa alincia Exley, 1976

Species of bee

Euryglossa alincia is a species of bee in the family Colletidae and the subfamily Euryglossinae. It is endemic to Australia. It was described in 1976 by Australian entomologist Elizabeth Exley.

== Distribution and habitat ==
The type locality is Amiens in the Southern Downs Region of south-eastern Queensland. It has also been recorded from Port Darwin in the Top End of the Northern Territory.

== Behaviour ==
The adults are flying mellivores. Flowering plants visited by the bees include Leptospermum species.
