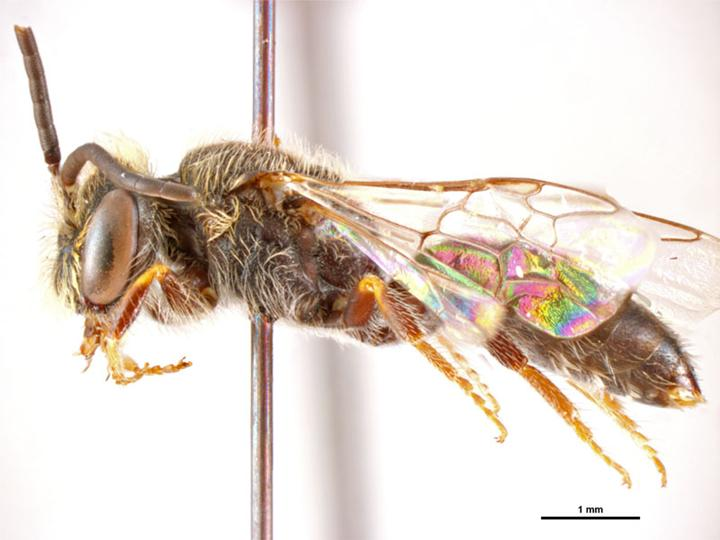
- Female

Scientific classification
- Kingdom: Animalia
- Phylum: Arthropoda
- Clade: Pancrustacea
- Class: Insecta
- Order: Hymenoptera
- Family: Colletidae
- Genus: Euryglossa
- Species: E. trichoda

Binomial name
- Euryglossa trichoda Exley, 1976

= Euryglossa trichoda =

Species of bee

Euryglossa trichoda is a species of bee in the family Colletidae and the subfamily Euryglossinae. It is endemic to Australia. It was described in 1976 by Australian entomologist Elizabeth Exley.

== Distribution and habitat ==
The species occurs in southern Queensland. The type locality is 5 km south-west of Warwick in the Darling Downs. It has also been recorded from Amiens.

== Behaviour ==
The adults are flying mellivores. Flowering plants visited by the bees include Leptospermum species.
