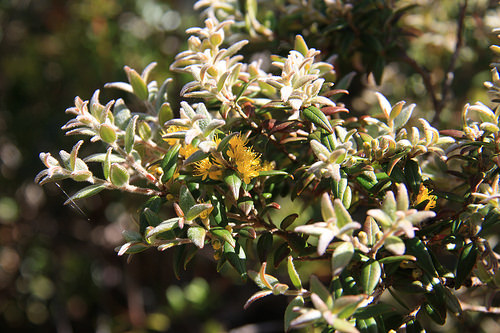
- Xanthomyrtus flavida

Scientific classification
- Kingdom: Plantae
- Clade: Tracheophytes
- Clade: Angiosperms
- Clade: Eudicots
- Clade: Rosids
- Order: Myrtales
- Family: Myrtaceae
- Subfamily: Myrtoideae
- Tribe: Tristanieae
- Genus: Xanthomyrtus; Diels

= Xanthomyrtus =

Genus of flowering plants

Xanthomyrtus is a group of shrubs and trees in the botanical family Myrtaceae described as a genus in 1922. It is found in Borneo, Moluccas, Sulawesi, Philippines, New Guinea, Bismarck Archipelago and New Caledonia.

They are mostly montane shrubs or trees, sometimes epiphytic. Flowers are yellow, usually 5-merous, in 3-flowered, axillary and terminal peduncles. The fruit is a reddish, dark blue or black berry.

species

1. Xanthomyrtus angustifolia - Sulawesi, New Guinea
2. Xanthomyrtus arfakensis - W New Guinea
3. Xanthomyrtus bryophila - W New Guinea
4. Xanthomyrtus cardiophylla - W New Guinea
5. Xanthomyrtus compacta - New Guinea, Maluku
6. Xanthomyrtus diplycosiifolia - Philippines, Maluku
7. Xanthomyrtus flavida - Sulawesi, Borneo
8. Xanthomyrtus grandiflora - W New Guinea
9. Xanthomyrtus humilis - New Guinea
10. Xanthomyrtus kanalaensis - New Caledonia
11. Xanthomyrtus koebrensis - W New Guinea
12. Xanthomyrtus lanceolata - New Guinea
13. Xanthomyrtus leeuwenii - New Guinea
14. Xanthomyrtus montis-sucklingii - Papua New Guinea
15. Xanthomyrtus montivaga - New Guinea
16. Xanthomyrtus oreophila - W New Guinea
17. Xanthomyrtus ovata - New Guinea
18. Xanthomyrtus papuana - New Guinea
19. Xanthomyrtus polyclada - New Guinea
20. Xanthomyrtus schlechteri - New Guinea, Bismarck
21. Xanthomyrtus scolopacina - New Guinea
22. Xanthomyrtus splendens - Papua New Guinea
