= Thaleropia =

Scientific classification
- Kingdom: Plantae
- Clade: Tracheophytes
- Clade: Angiosperms
- Clade: Eudicots
- Clade: Rosids
- Order: Myrtales
- Family: Myrtaceae
- Subfamily: Myrtoideae
- Tribe: Tristanieae
- Genus: Thaleropia; Peter G. Wilson

Synonyms
- Metrosideros sect. Adnatae J.W.Dawson

Genus of plants

Thaleropia is a genus of flowering plants in the family Myrtaceae first described as a genus in 1993. It is native to Queensland and Papuasia.

It includes three known species formally classified in the genus Metrosideros:

- Thaleropia hypargyrea (Diels) Peter G.Wilson - New Guinea, Solomon Islands, Santa Cruz Islands
- Thaleropia iteophylla (Diels) Peter G.Wilson - New Guinea
- Thaleropia queenslandica (L.S.Sm.) Peter G. Wilson - Queensland
