= Rust (color) =

Color resembling iron oxide

Color coordinates
- Hex triplet: #B7410E
- sRGB^{B} (r, g, b): (183, 65, 14)
- HSV (h, s, v): (18°, 92%, 72%)
- CIELCh_{uv} (L, C, h): (44, 102, 20°)
- Source: ColorHexa
- ISCC–NBS descriptor: Deep reddish orange
- B: Normalized to [0–255] (byte)

Rust is a red color resembling iron oxide red. It is a commonly used color on cars and appears roughly the same color as photographic safelights when used over a standard tungsten light source.

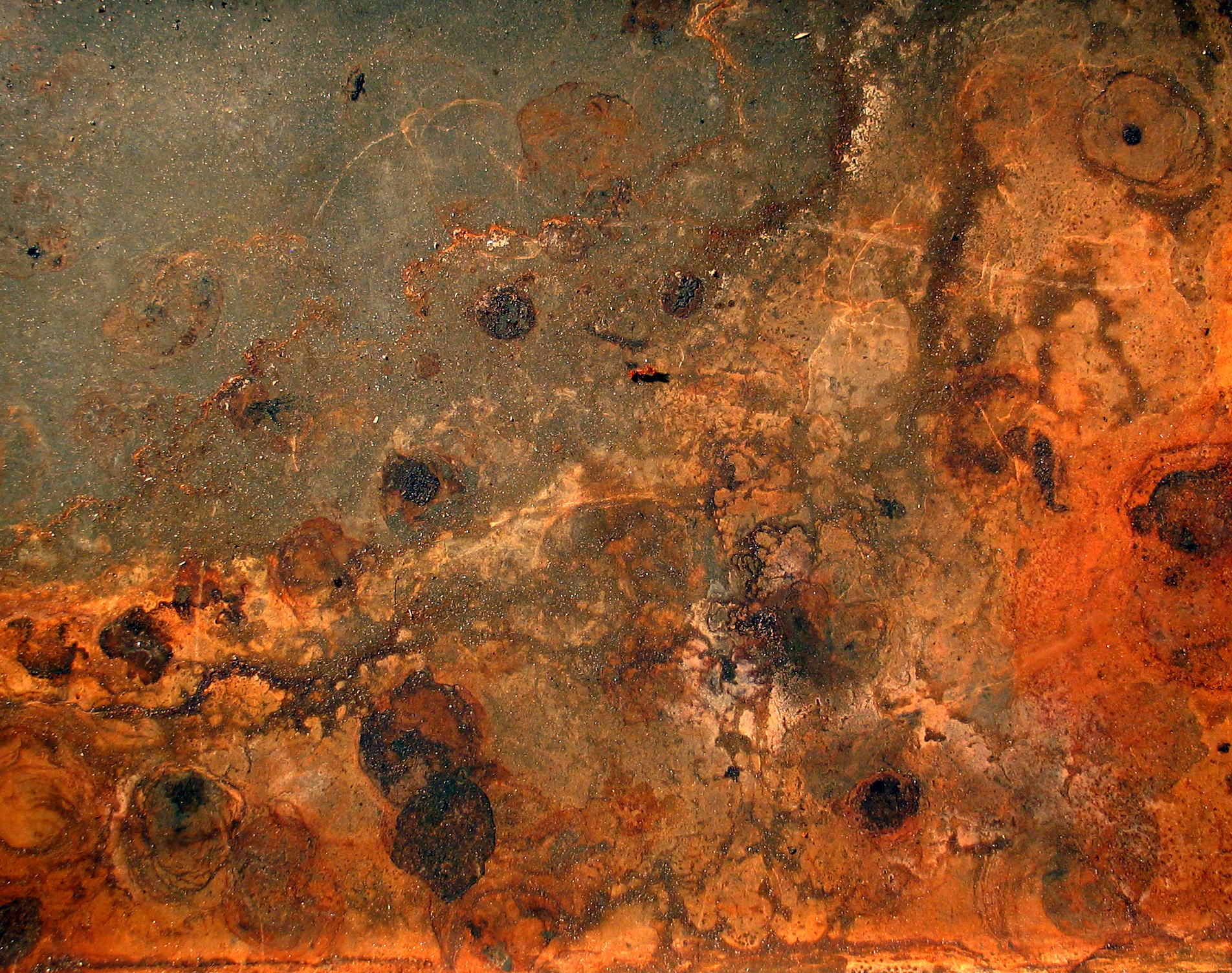
Rust

The first recorded use of rust as a color name in English was in 1692.

== Origin ==
Rust is named after the resulting phenomenon of the oxidation of iron. The word 'rust' finds its etymological origins in the Proto-Germanic word rusta, which translates to "redness." The word is closely related to the term "ruddy," which also refers to a reddish coloring in an object.

== See also ==
- List of colors
