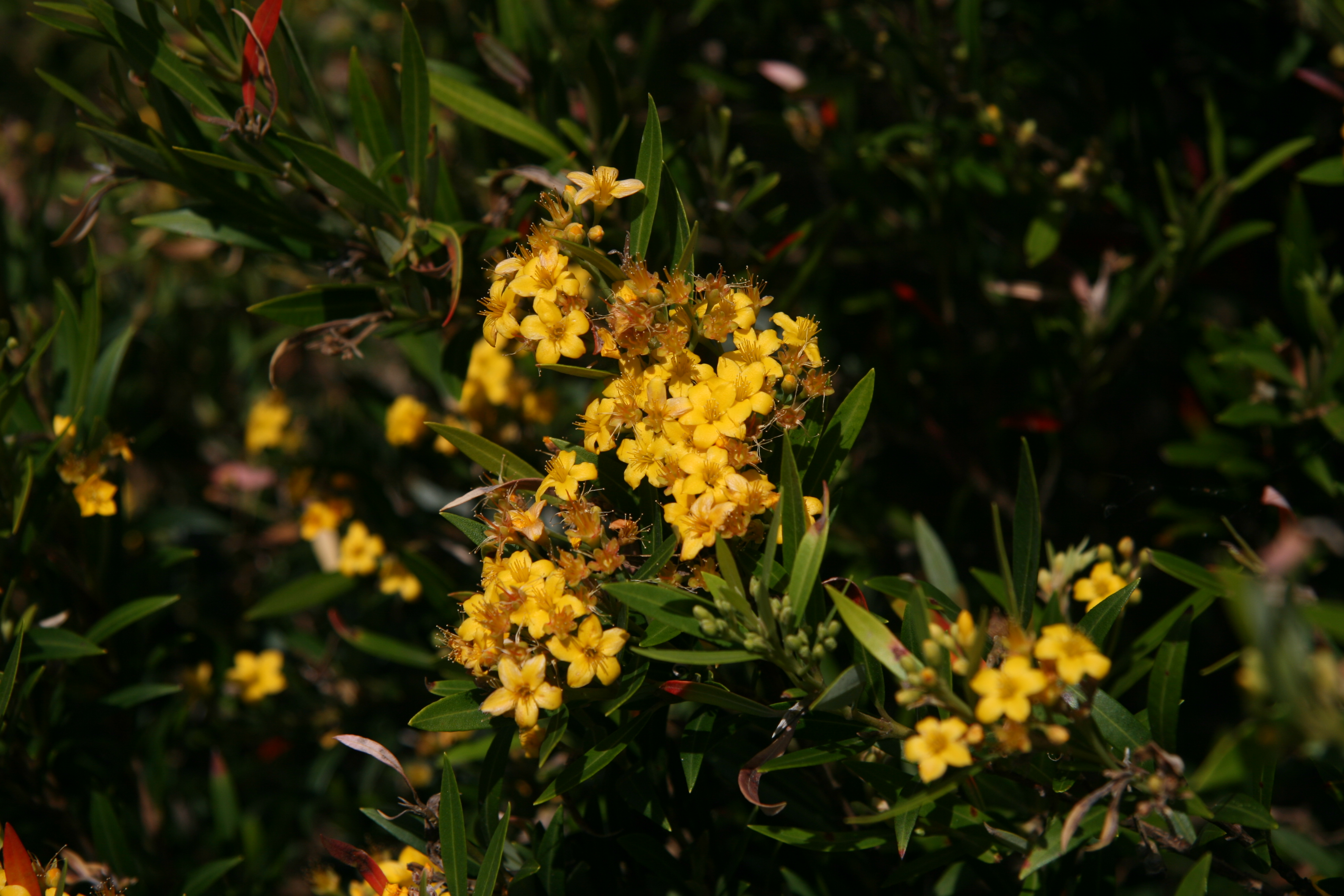
- Tristania neriifolia cultivated at Maleny, Queensland

Conservation status
- Least Concern (IUCN 3.1)

Scientific classification
- Kingdom: Plantae
- Clade: Tracheophytes
- Clade: Angiosperms
- Clade: Eudicots
- Clade: Rosids
- Order: Myrtales
- Family: Myrtaceae
- Subfamily: Myrtoideae
- Tribe: Tristanieae
- Genus: Tristania; R.Br.
- Species: T. neriifolia

Binomial name
- Tristania neriifolia (Sieber ex Sims) R.Br.

Synonyms
- Genus synonymy: Callobuxus Pancher ex Brongn. & Gris; Houttuynia Sepp; Species synonymy: Houttuynia neriifolia (Sims) Sepp; Melaleuca neriifolia Sims; Melaleuca salicifolia Andrews; Tristania persicifolia A.Cunn.; Tristania salicina A.Cunn.

= Tristania neriifolia =

Genus of flowering plants

Tristania is a monotypic genus of flowering plants native to New South Wales, Australia, closely related to Thaleropia. The genus had a number of species, but some have been reclassified as Lophostemon and Tristaniopsis. The sole species currently in the genus is Tristania neriifolia. It is commonly known as the water gum. The genus is named for the French botanist Jules Marie Claude de Tristan (1776–1861).

== Description ==
It is a small tree, with dense branching. The leaves are evergreen, opposite, simple, lanceolate, 5–9 cm long and 1 cm broad. The flowers are produced in dense clusters of 3–15 together; each flower is 1–1.5 cm diameter, with five small yellow petals and numerous conspicuous stamens.
