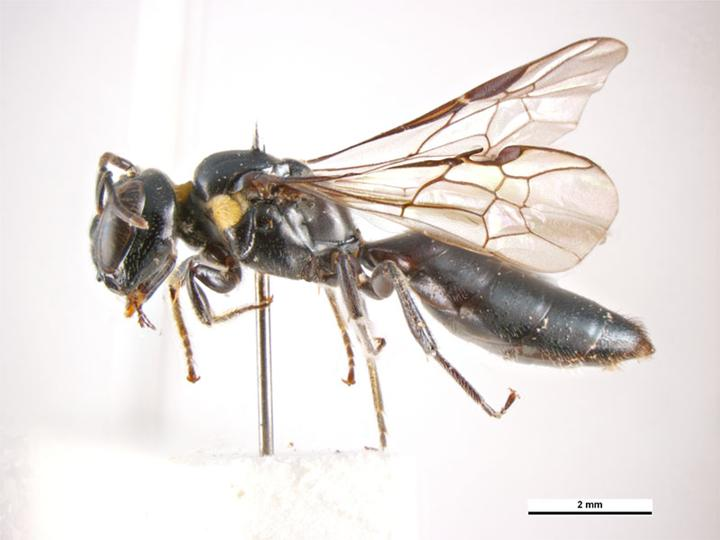
- Male

Scientific classification
- Kingdom: Animalia
- Phylum: Arthropoda
- Clade: Pancrustacea
- Class: Insecta
- Order: Hymenoptera
- Family: Colletidae
- Genus: Heterohesma
- Species: H. clypeata

Binomial name
- Heterohesma clypeata (Rayment, 1954)

Synonyms
- Stilpnosoma clypeata Rayment, 1954

= Heterohesma clypeata =

Species of bee

Heterohesma clypeata is a species of bee in the family Colletidae and the subfamily Euryglossinae. It is endemic to Australia. It was described in 1954 by Australian entomologist Tarlton Rayment.

== Etymology ==
The specific epithet clypeata is an anatomical reference to the "remarkable" structure of the clypeus.

== Description ==
Body length is 10 mm. The head and body are mainly black.

== Distribution and habitat ==
The species occurs in eastern New South Wales. The type locality is Jamberoo. It has also been recorded from Barrington Tops and Mount Tomah.

== Behaviour ==
The adults are flying mellivores.
