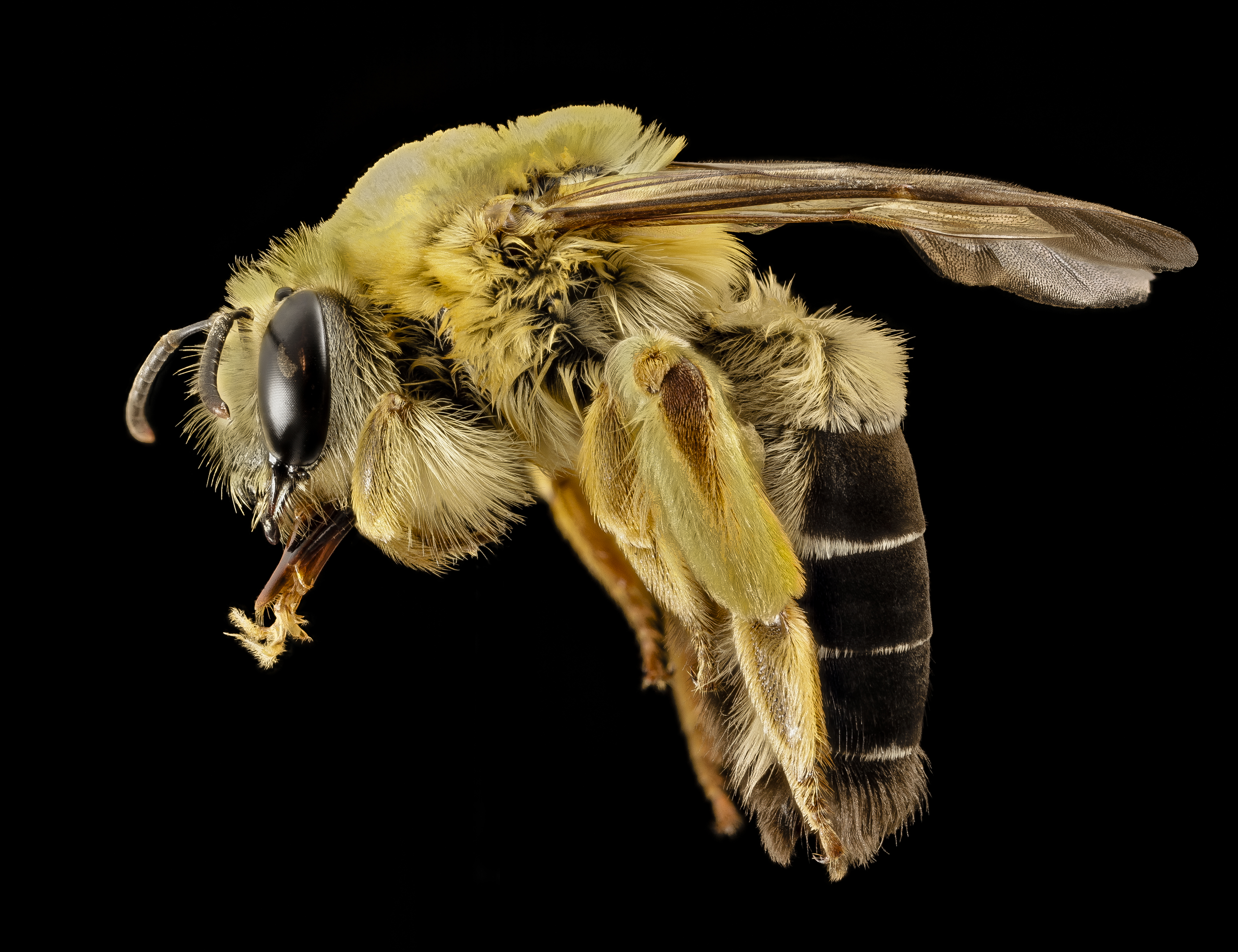
- Caupolicana electa

Scientific classification
- Kingdom: Animalia
- Phylum: Arthropoda
- Clade: Pancrustacea
- Class: Insecta
- Order: Hymenoptera
- Family: Colletidae
- Subfamily: Diphaglossinae

Tribes
- Caupolicanini; Diphaglossini; Dissoglottini

= Diphaglossinae =

Subfamily of bees

Diphaglossinae is a subfamily of bees in the family Colletidae. There are 9 genera and more than 130 described species in Diphaglossinae.

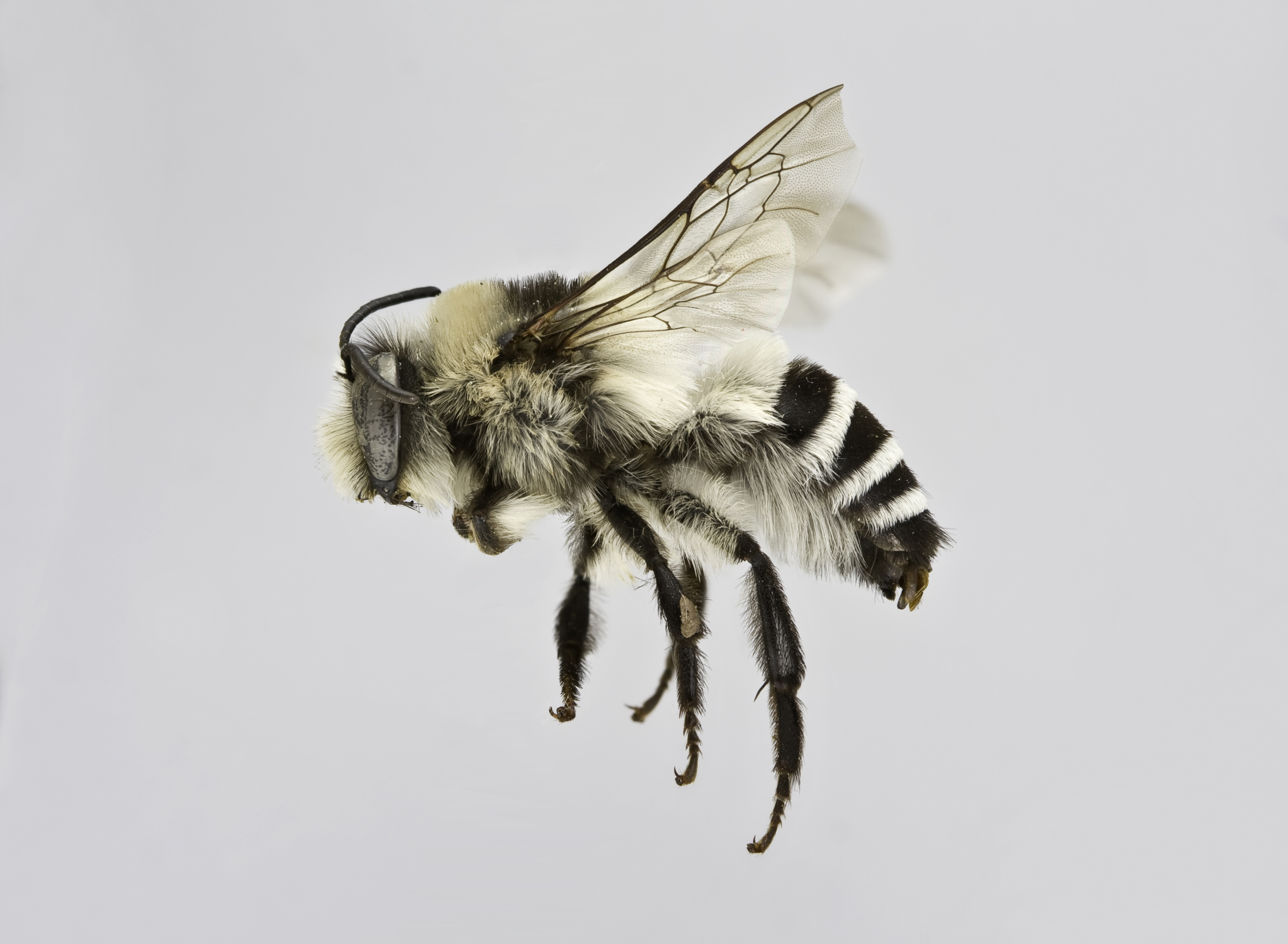
Caupolicana gayi

== Genera ==
- Cadeguala Reed, 1892
- Cadegualina Michener, 1986
- Caupolicana Spinola, 1851
- Crawfordapis Moure, 1964
- Diphaglossa Spinola, 1851
- Mydrosoma Smith, 1879
- Mydrosomella Michener, 1986
- Ptiloglossa Smith, 1853
- Ptiloglossidia Moure, 1953
