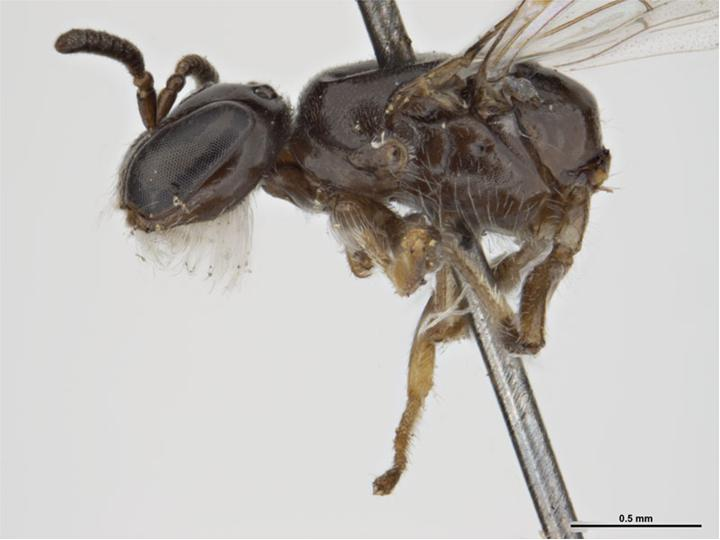
- Female

Scientific classification
- Kingdom: Animalia
- Phylum: Arthropoda
- Clade: Pancrustacea
- Class: Insecta
- Order: Hymenoptera
- Family: Colletidae
- Genus: Euryglossina
- Species: E. proctotrypoides

Binomial name
- Euryglossina proctotrypoides Cockerell, 1913

Synonyms
- Euryglossa minuta Rayment, 1935

= Euryglossina proctotrypoides =

Species of bee

Euryglossina proctotrypoides, or Euryglossina (Euryglossina) proctotrypoides, is a species of bee in the family Colletidae and the subfamily Euryglossinae. It was described in 1913 by British-American entomologist Theodore Dru Alison Cockerell.

== Distribution and habitat ==
The species occurs in eastern Australia. The type locality is Croydon, Victoria. The species has been introduced to New Zealand, and was established there by 1979.

== Behaviour ==
The adults are flying mellivores. They have sedentary larvae, nesting in beetle burrows in wood. Flowering plants visited by the bees include Angophora, Callistemon, Eucalyptus, Leptospermum and Melaleuca species.

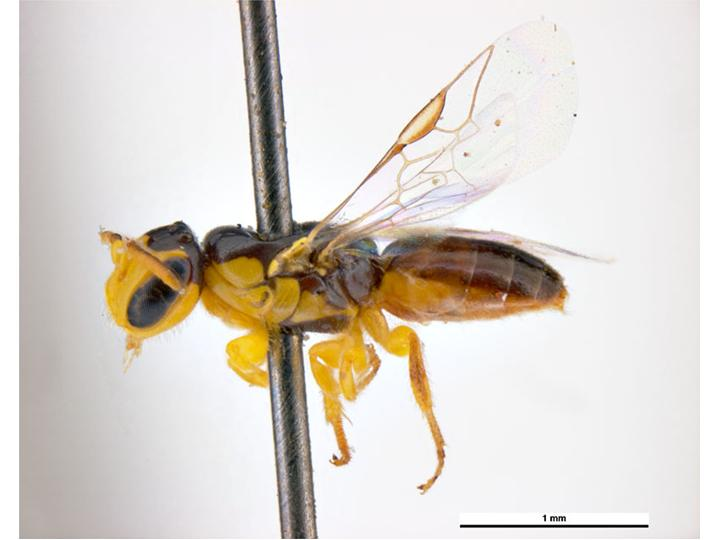
Male
