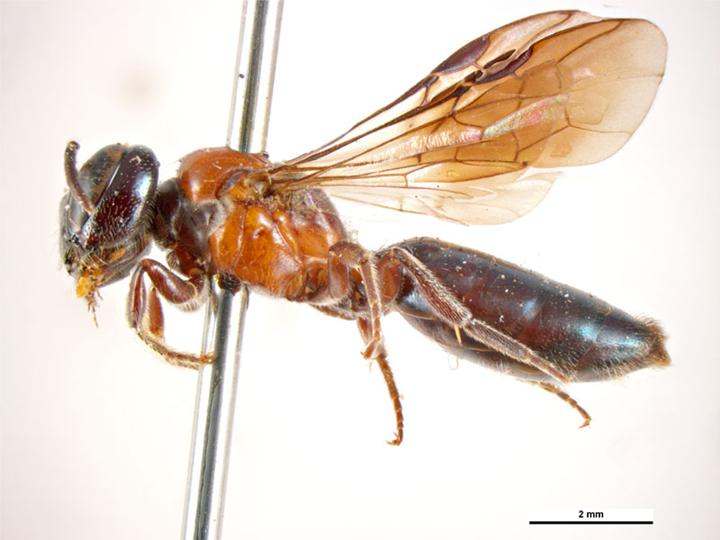
- Male

Scientific classification
- Kingdom: Animalia
- Phylum: Arthropoda
- Clade: Pancrustacea
- Class: Insecta
- Order: Hymenoptera
- Family: Colletidae
- Genus: Heterohesma
- Species: H. weiri

Binomial name
- Heterohesma weiri Exley, 1983

= Heterohesma weiri =

Species of bee

Heterohesma weiri is a species of bee in the family Colletidae and the subfamily Euryglossinae. It is endemic to Australia. It was described in 1983 by Australian entomologist Elizabeth Exley.

== Distribution and habitat ==
The species occurs in south-eastern Australia. The type locality is New England National Park in New South Wales. It has also been recorded from Victoria and from Mount Field National Park in Tasmania.

== Behaviour ==
The adults are flying mellivores.

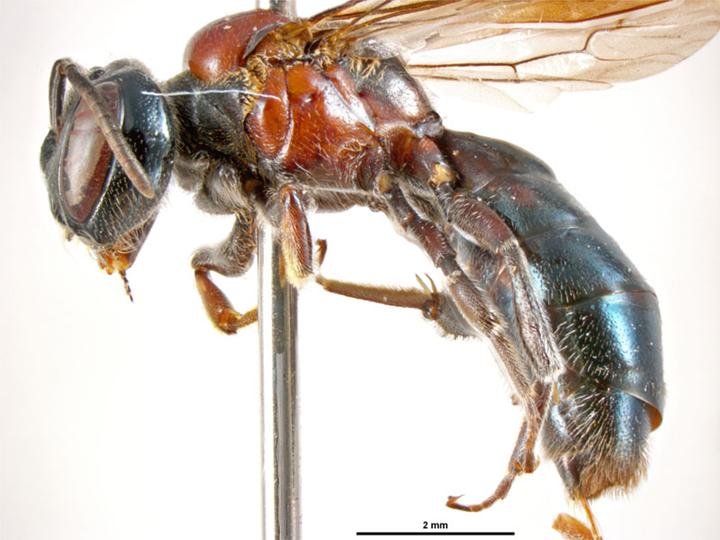
Female
