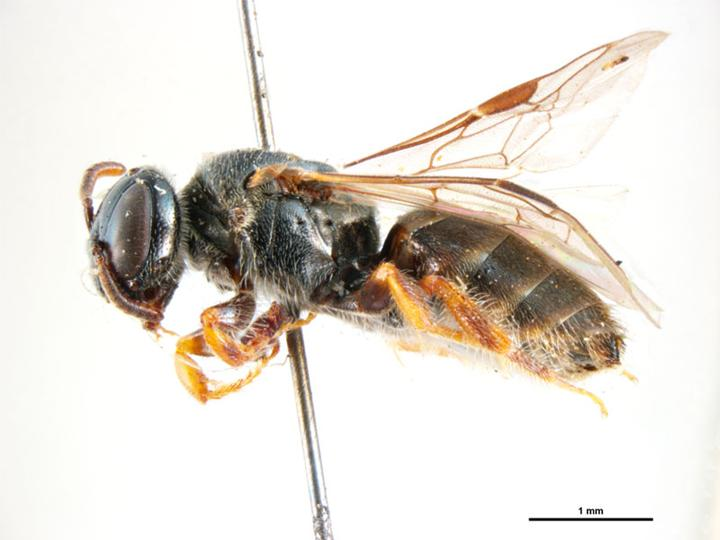
- Female

Scientific classification
- Kingdom: Animalia
- Phylum: Arthropoda
- Clade: Pancrustacea
- Class: Insecta
- Order: Hymenoptera
- Family: Colletidae
- Genus: Hyphesma
- Species: H. atromicans

Binomial name
- Hyphesma atromicans (Cockerell, 1913)

Synonyms
- Pachyprosopis atromicans Cockerell, 1913; Pachyprosopis barbata Cockerell, 1914; Euryglossa oleariae Rayment, 1935; Euryglossa elthamensis Rayment, 1935; Pachyprosopis celmisiae Rayment, 1949

= Hyphesma atromicans =

Species of bee

Hyphesma atromicans is a species of bee in the family Colletidae and the subfamily Euryglossinae. It is endemic to Australia. It was described in 1913 by British-American entomologist Theodore Dru Alison Cockerell.

== Distribution and habitat ==
The species occurs in much of southern Australia. Type localities include Purnong in South Australia, Brisbane in south-east Queensland, as well as Sandringham, Eltham and Mount Buffalo in Victoria.

== Behaviour ==
The adults are flying mellivores that nest in soil. Flowering plants visited by the bees include Leptospermum, Angophora, Bursaria, Celmisia, Eucalyptus, Goodenia, Jacksonia, Olearia and Tristania species.

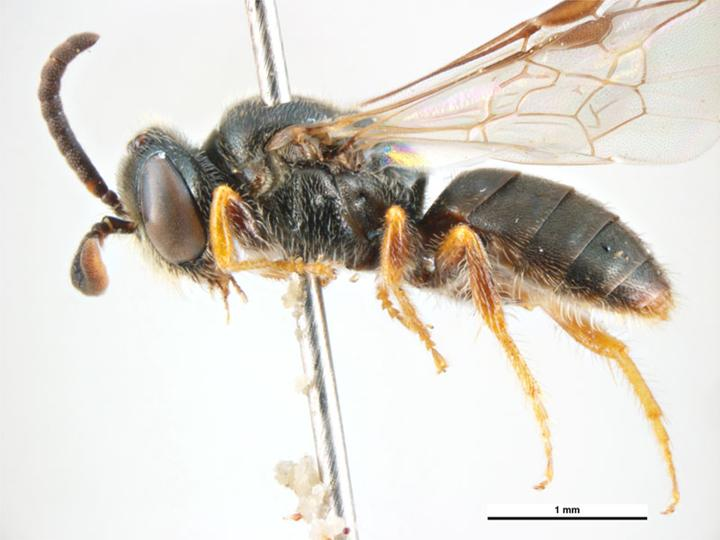
Male
