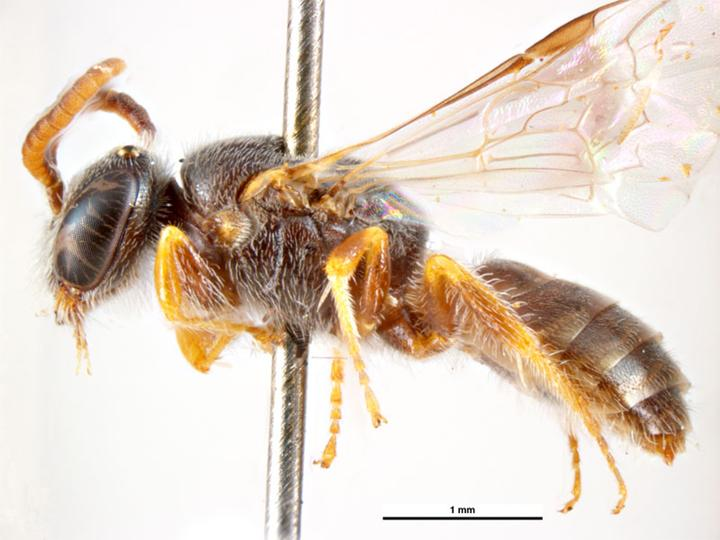
- Female

Scientific classification
- Kingdom: Animalia
- Phylum: Arthropoda
- Clade: Pancrustacea
- Class: Insecta
- Order: Hymenoptera
- Family: Colletidae
- Genus: Hyphesma
- Species: H. nitidiceps

Binomial name
- Hyphesma nitidiceps (Cockerell, 1912)

Synonyms
- Pachyprosopis nitidiceps Cockerell, 1912

= Hyphesma nitidiceps =

Species of bee

Hyphesma nitidiceps is a species of bee in the family Colletidae and the subfamily Euryglossinae. It is endemic to Australia. It was described in 1912 by British-American entomologist Theodore Dru Alison Cockerell.

== Distribution and habitat ==
The species occurs in Queensland. The type locality is Mackay.

== Behaviour ==
The adults are flying mellivores. Flowering plants visited by the bees include Leptospermum species.

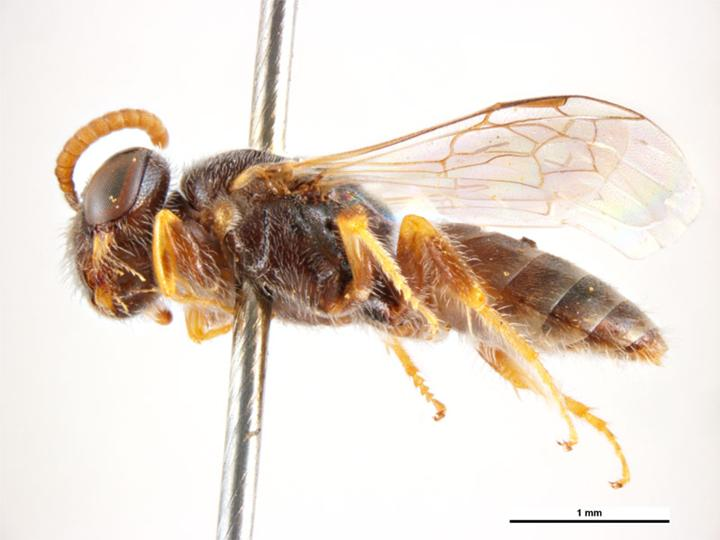
Male
