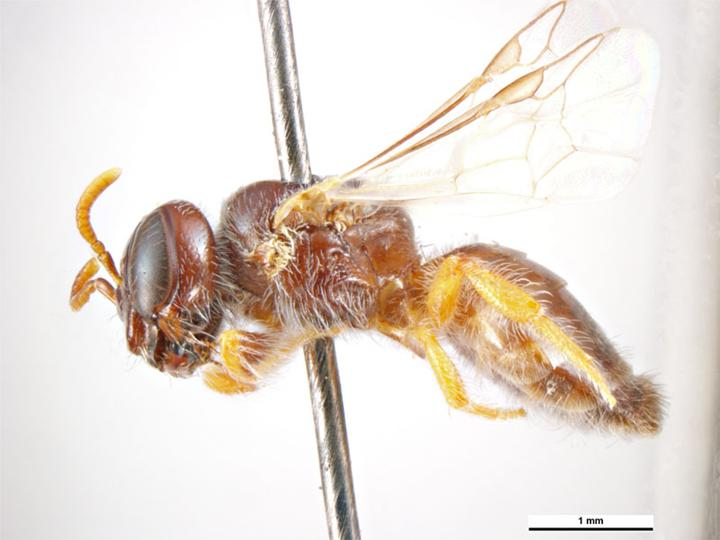
- Female

Scientific classification
- Kingdom: Animalia
- Phylum: Arthropoda
- Clade: Pancrustacea
- Class: Insecta
- Order: Hymenoptera
- Family: Colletidae
- Genus: Tumidihesma
- Species: T. tridentata

Binomial name
- Tumidihesma tridentata Exley, 1996

= Tumidihesma tridentata =

Species of bee

Tumidihesma tridentata is a species of bee in the family Colletidae and the subfamily Euryglossinae. It is endemic to Australia. It was described in 1996 by Australian entomologist Elizabeth Exley.

== Etymology ==
The specific epithet tridentata refers to the three-toothed mandibles characteristic of the genus.

== Description ==
Only female specimens have been collected; males are unknown. Body length is 6 mm, wing length 4 mm. The head is black with a reddish-brown clypeus. The species is distinguished by the colour of the clypeus from that of its congener T. flaviceps, which is golden-yellow.

== Distribution and habitat ==
The species occurs in arid parts of central and southern inland Australia. The type locality is 39 km east of Alice Springs in the Northern Territory. It has also been recorded from Higginsville in Western Australia and Lock on the Eyre Peninsula of South Australia.

== Behaviour ==
The adults are flying mellivores. Flowering plants visited by the bees include Eucalyptus and Leptospermum species.
