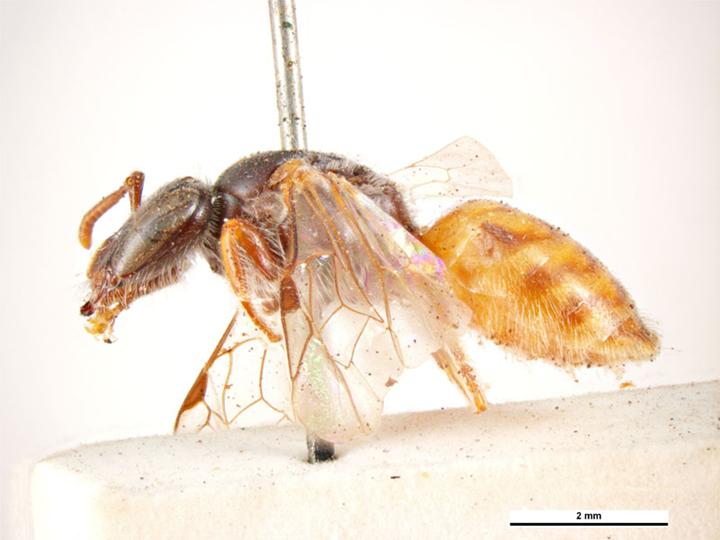
- Female

Scientific classification
- Kingdom: Animalia
- Phylum: Arthropoda
- Clade: Pancrustacea
- Class: Insecta
- Order: Hymenoptera
- Family: Colletidae
- Genus: Melittosmithia
- Species: M. subtilis

Binomial name
- Melittosmithia subtilis Cockerell, 1926

= Melittosmithia subtilis =

Species of bee

Melittosmithia subtilis is a species of bee in the family Colletidae and the subfamily Euryglossinae. It is endemic to Australia. It was described in 1926 by British-American entomologist Theodore Dru Alison Cockerell.

== Distribution and habitat ==
The species occurs in Victoria. The type locality is probably Oakleigh.

== Behaviour ==
The adults are flying mellivores.
