= Melittosmithia adelaidae =

Scientific classification
- Kingdom: Animalia
- Phylum: Arthropoda
- Clade: Pancrustacea
- Class: Insecta
- Order: Hymenoptera
- Family: Colletidae
- Genus: Melittosmithia
- Species: M. adelaidae

Binomial name
- Melittosmithia adelaidae (Friese, 1924)

Synonyms
- Stilpnosoma adelaidae Friese,1924

Species of bee

Melittosmithia adelaidae is a species of bee in the family Colletidae and the subfamily Euryglossinae. It is endemic to Australia. It was described in 1924 by German entomologist Heinrich Friese.

== Distribution and habitat ==
The species occurs in New South Wales. The type locality is Sydney. The location of the female holotype is unknown.

== Behaviour ==
The adults are flying mellivores.
