= Melittosmithia carinata =

Scientific classification
- Kingdom: Animalia
- Phylum: Arthropoda
- Clade: Pancrustacea
- Class: Insecta
- Order: Hymenoptera
- Family: Colletidae
- Genus: Melittosmithia
- Species: M. carinata

Binomial name
- Melittosmithia carinata (Smith, 1862)

Synonyms
- Scrapter carinata Smith,1862

Species of bee

Melittosmithia carinata is a species of bee in the family Colletidae and the subfamily Euryglossinae. It is endemic to Australia. It was described in 1862 by English entomologist Frederick Smith.

== Distribution and habitat ==
The species occurs in Australia. No more precise type locality has been recorded.

== Behaviour ==
The adults are flying mellivores.
