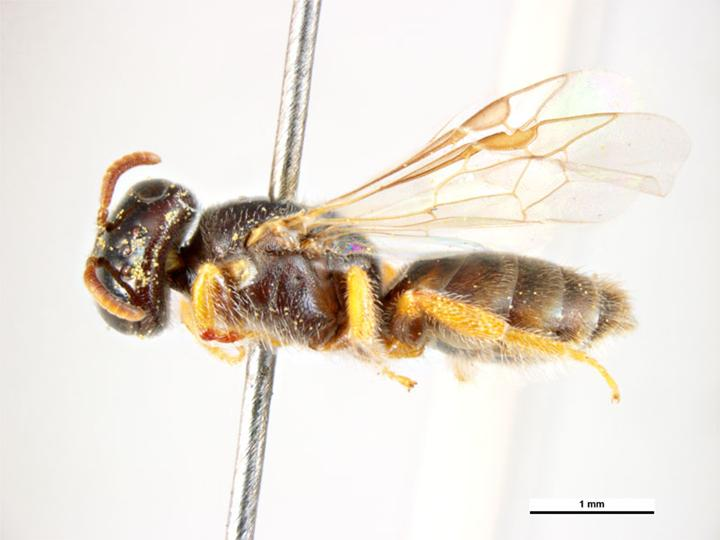
- Male

Scientific classification
- Kingdom: Animalia
- Phylum: Arthropoda
- Clade: Pancrustacea
- Class: Insecta
- Order: Hymenoptera
- Family: Colletidae
- Genus: Hyphesma
- Species: H. barrowensis

Binomial name
- Hyphesma barrowensis Exley, 1975

= Hyphesma barrowensis =

Species of bee

Hyphesma barrowensis is a species of bee in the family Colletidae and the subfamily Euryglossinae. It is endemic to Australia. It was described in 1975 by Australian entomologist Elizabeth Exley.

== Distribution and habitat ==
The species occurs in the Northern Territory. The type locality is 22 km north of Barrow Creek.

== Behaviour ==
The adults are flying mellivores.
