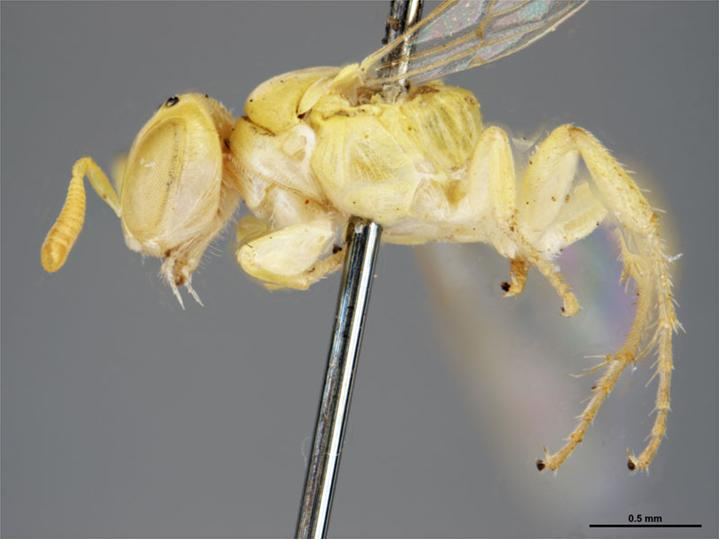
- Female

Scientific classification
- Kingdom: Animalia
- Phylum: Arthropoda
- Clade: Pancrustacea
- Class: Insecta
- Order: Hymenoptera
- Family: Colletidae
- Genus: Tumidihesma
- Species: T. flaviceps

Binomial name
- Tumidihesma flaviceps Exley, 1996

= Tumidihesma flaviceps =

Species of bee

Tumidihesma flaviceps is a species of bee in the family Colletidae and the subfamily Euryglossinae. It is endemic to Australia. It was described in 1996 by Australian entomologist Elizabeth Exley.

== Etymology ==
The specific epithet flaviceps refers to the distinctive golden-yellow colouring on the head.

== Description ==
Only female specimens have been collected; males are unknown. Body length is 6 mm, wing length 4 mm. The head is black with a golden-yellow clypeus. The species is distinguished by the colour of the clypeus from that of its congener T. tridentata, which is reddish-brown.

== Distribution and habitat ==
The species occurs in south-west Western Australia. The type locality is Coolgardie. It has also been recorded from Southern Cross. The habitat is arid, with a desert climate.

== Behaviour ==
The adults are flying mellivores. Flowering plants visited by the bees include Eucalyptus species.
