= Melittosmithia froggattiana =

Scientific classification
- Kingdom: Animalia
- Phylum: Arthropoda
- Clade: Pancrustacea
- Class: Insecta
- Order: Hymenoptera
- Family: Colletidae
- Genus: Melittosmithia
- Species: M. froggattiana

Binomial name
- Melittosmithia froggattiana (Cockerell, 1905)

Synonyms
- Euryglossa froggattiana Cockerell,1905

Species of bee

Melittosmithia froggattiana is a species of bee in the family Colletidae and the subfamily Euryglossinae. It is endemic to Australia. It was described in 1905 by British-American entomologist Theodore Dru Alison Cockerell.

== Distribution and habitat ==
The species occurs in New South Wales. The type locality is Shoalhaven.

== Behaviour ==
The adults are flying mellivores.
