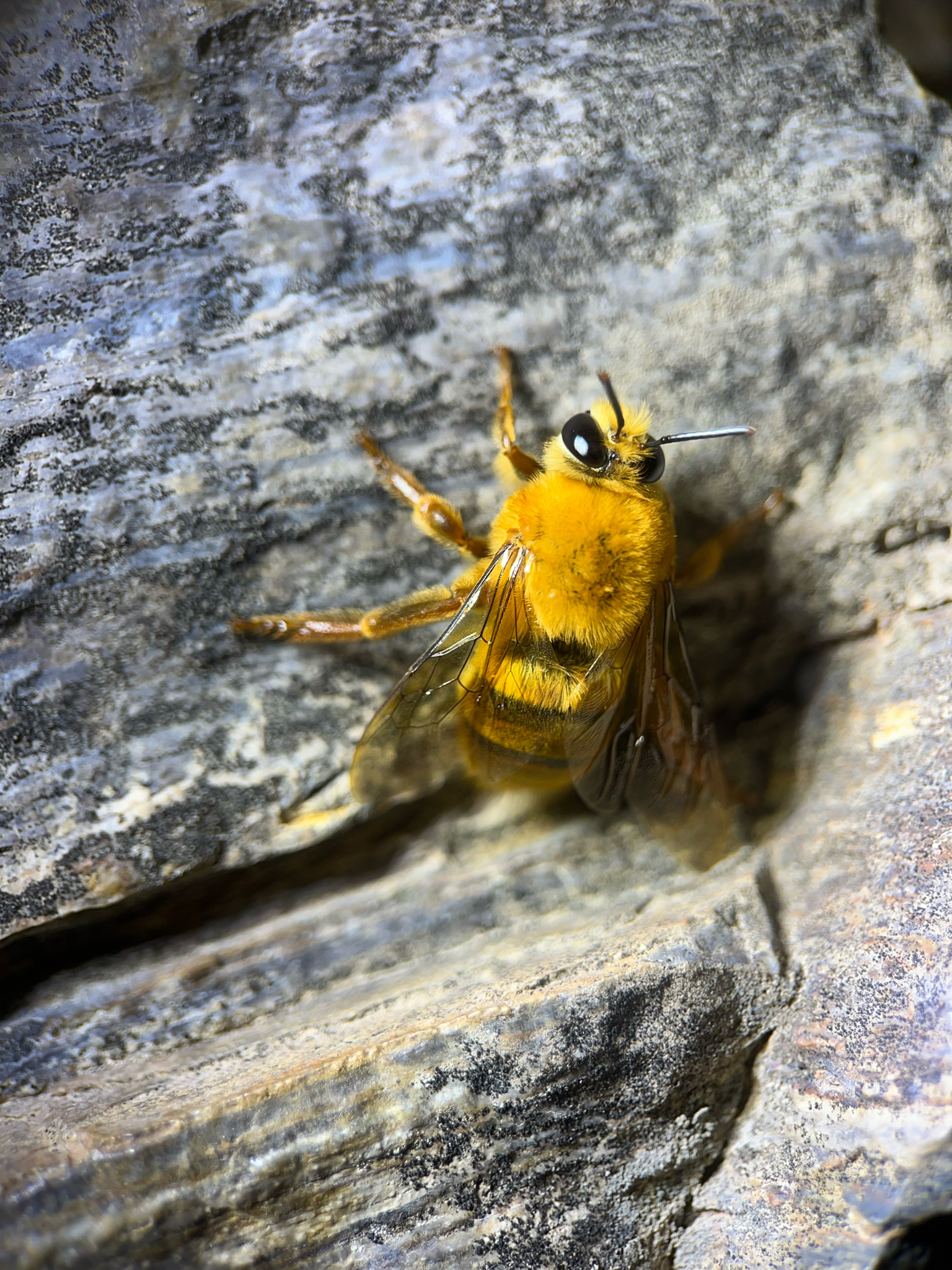

Scientific classification
- Kingdom: Animalia
- Phylum: Arthropoda
- Clade: Pancrustacea
- Class: Insecta
- Order: Hymenoptera
- Family: Colletidae
- Genus: Caupolicana
- Species: C. elegans

Binomial name
- Caupolicana elegans Timberlake, 1965

Synonyms
- Zikanapis elegans (Timberlake, 1965)

= Caupolicana elegans =

Species of bee

Caupolicana elegans is a species of bee in the family Colletidae. It is found in Mexico and the United States (Arizona).
