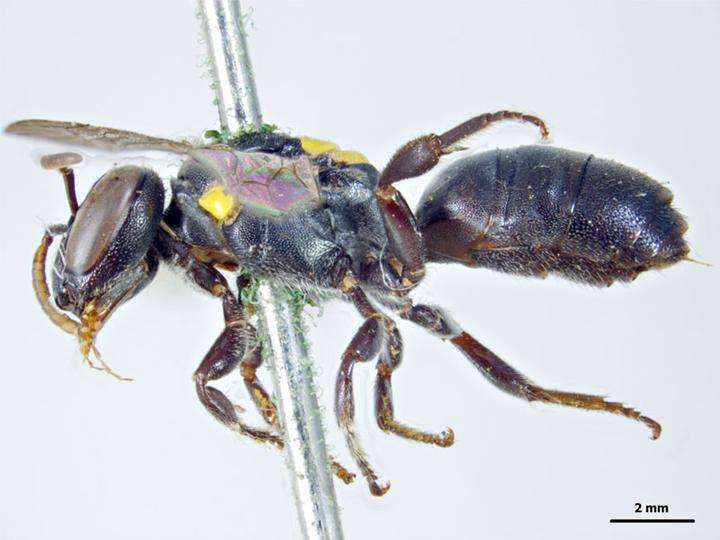
- Female

Scientific classification
- Kingdom: Animalia
- Phylum: Arthropoda
- Clade: Pancrustacea
- Class: Insecta
- Order: Hymenoptera
- Family: Colletidae
- Genus: Amphylaeus
- Species: A. obscuriceps

Binomial name
- Amphylaeus obscuriceps (Friese, 1924)

Synonyms
- Prosopis obscuriceps Friese, 1924; Hylaeus longmani Cockerell, 1929; Hylaeus arnoldi Rayment, 1939

= Amphylaeus obscuriceps =

Species of bee

Amphylaeus obscuriceps, or Amphylaeus (Agogenohylaeus) obscuriceps, is a species of bee in the family Colletidae and the subfamily Hylaeinae. It is endemic to Australia. It was described in 1924 by German entomologist Heinrich Friese.

== Distribution and habitat ==
The species occurs in eastern Australia. Type localities include Emerald, Victoria and Brisbane in south-eastern Queensland.

== Behaviour ==
The adults are flying mellivores. Flowering plants visited by the bees include Banksia, Callistemon, Eucalyptus, Eugenia, Hakea, Loranthus and Xanthorrhoea species.

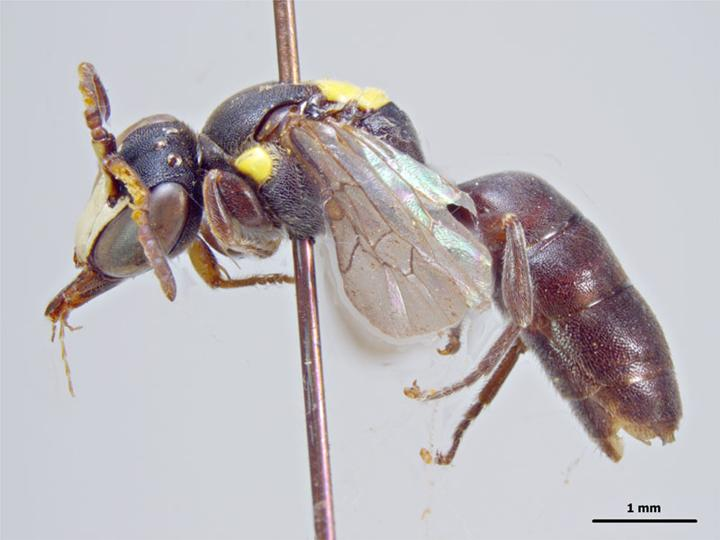
Male
