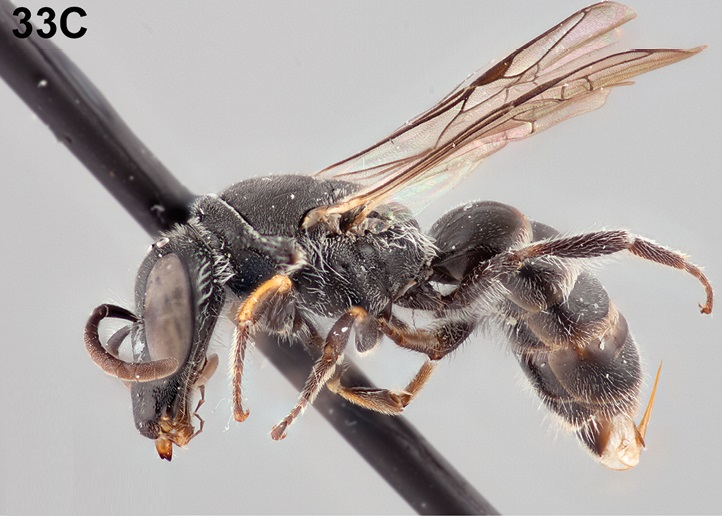
- female

Scientific classification
- Kingdom: Animalia
- Phylum: Arthropoda
- Clade: Pancrustacea
- Class: Insecta
- Order: Hymenoptera
- Family: Colletidae
- Genus: Chilicola
- Species: C. charizard

Binomial name
- Chilicola charizard Monckton, 2016

= Chilicola charizard =

Species of bee

Chilicola charizard is a species of bee. The species is found in the Andes of Chile. It was named after the Pokémon Charizard.
