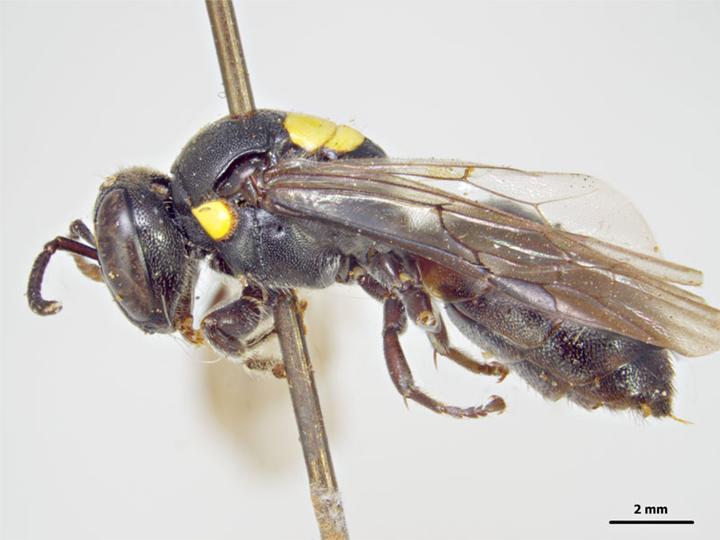
- Female, lateral view

Scientific classification
- Kingdom: Animalia
- Phylum: Arthropoda
- Clade: Pancrustacea
- Class: Insecta
- Order: Hymenoptera
- Family: Colletidae
- Genus: Amphylaeus
- Species: A. nubilosellus

Binomial name
- Amphylaeus nubilosellus (Cockerell, 1910)

Synonyms
- Prosopis nubilosella mediosticta Cockerell, 1912; Prosopis sydneyensis Friese, 1924

= Amphylaeus nubilosellus =

Species of bee

Amphylaeus nubilosellus, or Amphylaeus (Agogenohylaeus) nubilosellus, is a species of bee in the family Colletidae and the subfamily Hylaeinae. It is endemic to Australia. It was described in 1910 by British-American entomologist Theodore Dru Alison Cockerell.

== Description ==
Body length is about 7 mm. Colouration is mainly black, with small yellow markings.

== Distribution and habitat ==
The species occurs in eastern Australia. Type localities include Sydney and Botany, New South Wales.

== Behaviour ==
The adults are solitary flying mellivores which nest in dead Xanthorrhoea flower stalks. Flowering plants visited by the bees include Banksia, Boronia, Daviesia, Goodenia, Jacksonia, Loranthus, Melaleuca, Rubus and Solanum species.

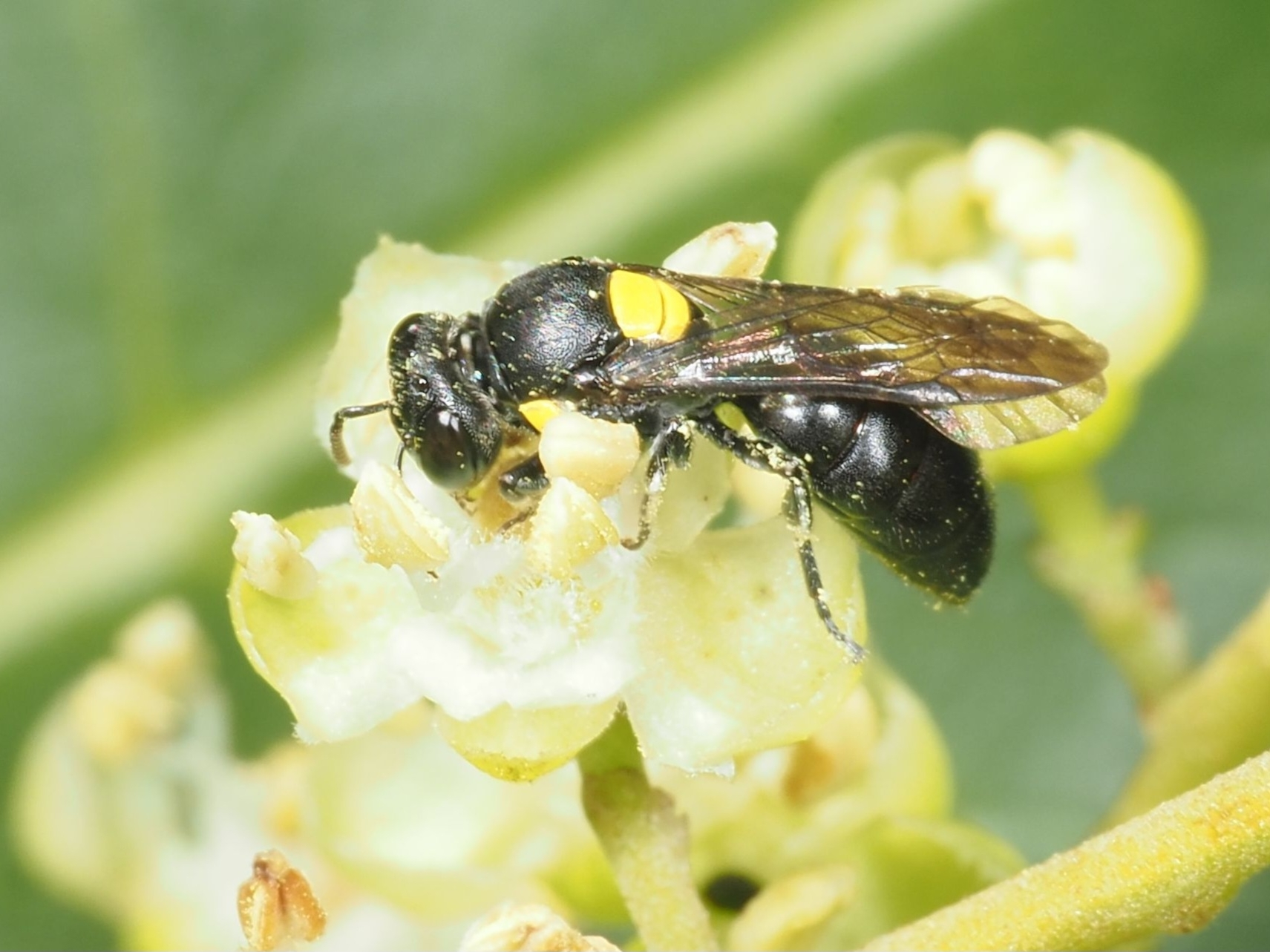
Amphylaeus nubilosellus female at flowers

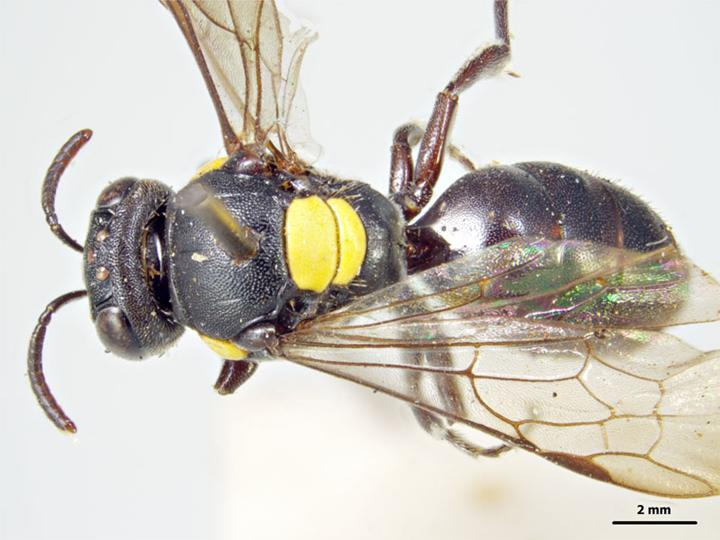
Female, dorsal view
