= Ptiloglossa mexicana =

Scientific classification
- Kingdom: Animalia
- Phylum: Arthropoda
- Clade: Pancrustacea
- Class: Insecta
- Order: Hymenoptera
- Family: Colletidae
- Genus: Ptiloglossa
- Species: P. mexicana

Binomial name
- Ptiloglossa mexicana (Cresson, 1878)

Species of bee

Ptiloglossa mexicana is a species of nocturnal bee in the family Colletidae. It is found from Central America north to Texas.
