= Amphylaeus flavicans =

Scientific classification
- Kingdom: Animalia
- Phylum: Arthropoda
- Clade: Pancrustacea
- Class: Insecta
- Order: Hymenoptera
- Family: Colletidae
- Genus: Amphylaeus
- Species: A. flavicans

Binomial name
- Amphylaeus flavicans Houston, 1975

Species of bee

Amphylaeus flavicans, or Amphylaeus (Agogenohylaeus) flavicans, is a species of bee in the family Colletidae and the subfamily Hylaeinae. It is endemic to Australia. It was described in 1975 by Australian entomologist Terry Houston.

== Distribution and habitat ==
The species occurs in southern Queensland The type locality is some 3 km north of Wallangarra in the Southern Downs Region.

== Behaviour ==
The adults are flying mellivores. Flowering plants visited by the bees include Amyema species.
