= Caupolicana ocellata =

Scientific classification
- Kingdom: Animalia
- Phylum: Arthropoda
- Clade: Pancrustacea
- Class: Insecta
- Order: Hymenoptera
- Family: Colletidae
- Genus: Caupolicana
- Species: C. ocellata

Binomial name
- Caupolicana ocellata Michener, 1966

Species of bee

Caupolicana ocellata is a species of hymenopteran in the family Colletidae. It is found in Central America and North America.
