= Caupolicana yarrowi =

Scientific classification
- Kingdom: Animalia
- Phylum: Arthropoda
- Clade: Pancrustacea
- Class: Insecta
- Order: Hymenoptera
- Family: Colletidae
- Genus: Caupolicana
- Species: C. yarrowi

Binomial name
- Caupolicana yarrowi (Cresson, 1875)

Species of bee

Caupolicana yarrowi is a species of hymenopteran in the family Colletidae. It is found in Central America and North America.
