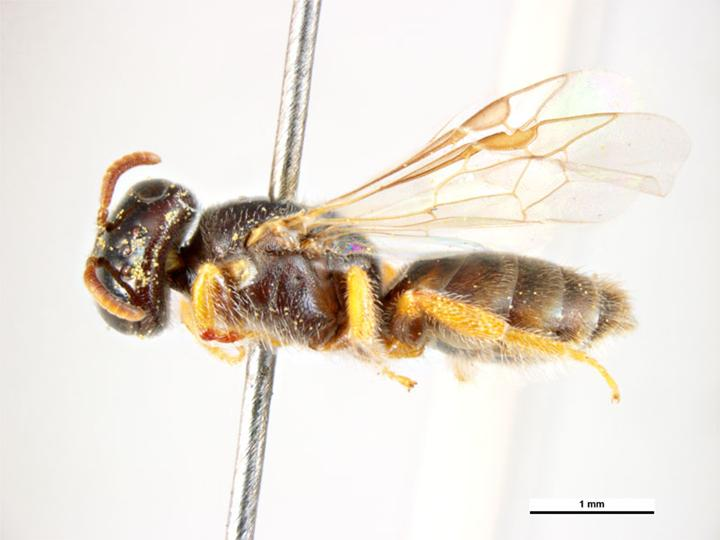
- Hyphesma barrowensis, male

Scientific classification
- Kingdom: Animalia
- Phylum: Arthropoda
- Clade: Pancrustacea
- Class: Insecta
- Order: Hymenoptera
- Superfamily: Apoidea
- Clade: Anthophila
- Family: Colletidae
- Subfamily: Euryglossinae
- Genus: Hyphesma; Michener, 1965

= Hyphesma =

Genus of bees

Hyphesma is a genus of bees in the family Colletidae and the subfamily Euryglossinae. It is endemic to Australia. It was described in 1965 by American entomologist Charles Duncan Michener.

== Species ==
As of 2026 the genus contained seven valid species:

- Hyphesma atromicans (Cockerell, 1913)
- Hyphesma barrowensis Exley, 1975
- Hyphesma cardaleae Exley, 1975
- Hyphesma cooba Exley, 1975
- Hyphesma federalis Exley, 1975
- Hyphesma nitidiceps (Cockerell, 1912)
- Hyphesma nukarnensis Exley, 1975
