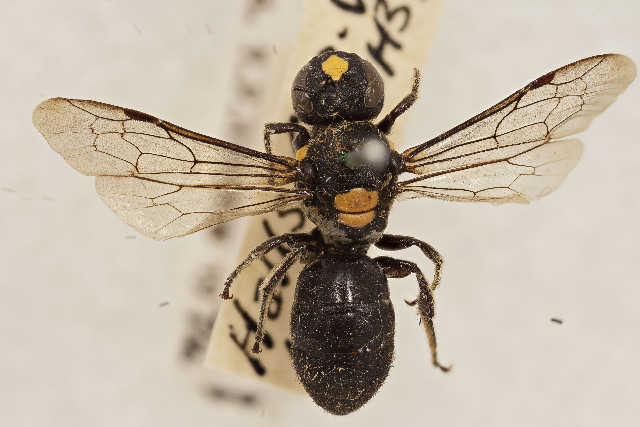
- Amphylaeus morosus

Scientific classification
- Kingdom: Animalia
- Phylum: Arthropoda
- Clade: Pancrustacea
- Class: Insecta
- Order: Hymenoptera
- Family: Colletidae
- Genus: Amphylaeus; Michener, 1965

Type species
- Amphylaeus morosus (Smith, 1879)

= Amphylaeus =

Genus of bees

Amphylaeus is a genus of plasterer bee in the Colletidae family and Hylaeinae subfamily. The genus is endemic to Australia.

== Description ==
Amphylaeus bees are slender, less than 10 mm long, and black with pale, mask-like facial markings. Some have a yellow spot on the thorax. They nest in pithy stems or preexisting holes in wood. Their brood cells are woven from a cellophane-like secretion.

== Taxonomy ==
Amphylaeus contains the following subgenera:

- Agogenohylaeus Michener, 1965
- Amphylaeus Michener, 1965

Species include:

- Amphylaeus flavicans Houston, 1975
- Amphylaeus morosus (Smith, 1879)
- Amphylaeus nubilosellus (Cockerell, 1910)
- Amphylaeus obscuriceps (Friese, 1924)
