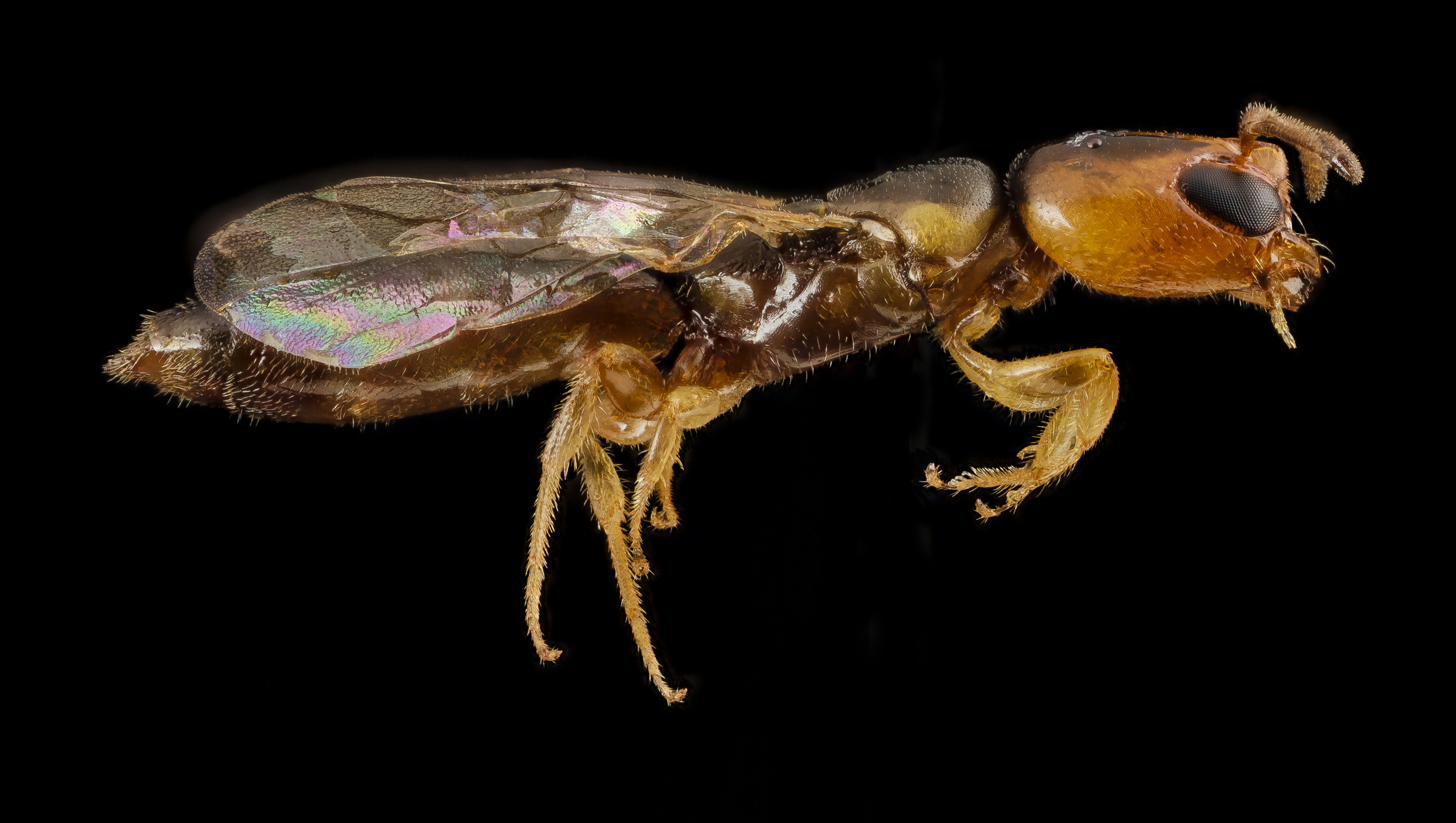
- Euryglossina leyburnensis

Scientific classification
- Kingdom: Animalia
- Phylum: Arthropoda
- Clade: Pancrustacea
- Class: Insecta
- Order: Hymenoptera
- Family: Colletidae
- Genus: Euryglossina; Cockerell, 1910

= Euryglossina =

Genus of bees

Euryglossina is a genus of bees belonging to the family Colletidae and the subfamily Euryglossinae. As of 2026 there were about 73 valid species, which are found almost entirely in Australia, though one species (Euryglossina proctotrypoides) has been introduced to New Zealand. The genus was described in 1910 by British-American entomologist Theodore Dru Alison Cockerell, and revised in 1968 by Australian entomologist Elizabeth Exley.

== Subgenera ==
There are five subgenera:

- Euryglossina (Euryglossella) Cockerell, 1910
- Euryglossina (Euryglossina) Cockerell, 1910
- Euryglossina (Microdontura) Cockerell, 1929
- Euryglossina (Quasihesma) Exley, 1968
- Euryglossina (Turnerella) Cockerell, 1910

== Species ==
- See: List of Euryglossina species
