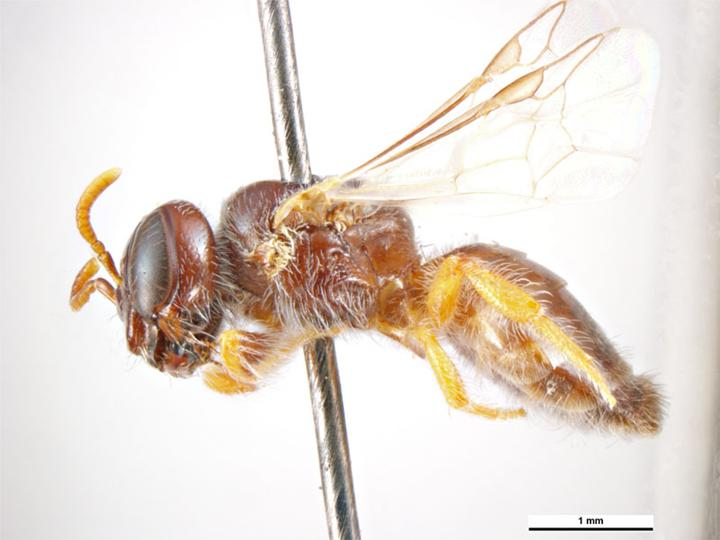
- Tumidihesma tridentata

Scientific classification
- Kingdom: Animalia
- Phylum: Arthropoda
- Clade: Pancrustacea
- Class: Insecta
- Order: Hymenoptera
- Superfamily: Apoidea
- Clade: Anthophila
- Family: Colletidae
- Subfamily: Euryglossinae
- Genus: Tumidihesma; Exley, 1996

= Tumidihesma =

Genus of bees

Tumidihesma is a genus of bees in the family Colletidae and the subfamily Euryglossinae. It is endemic to Australia. It was described in 1996 by Australian entomologist Elizabeth Exley.

== Species ==
As of 2026 the genus contained two valid species:

- Tumidihesma flaviceps Exley, 1996
- Tumidihesma tridentata Exley, 1996 (type species)
