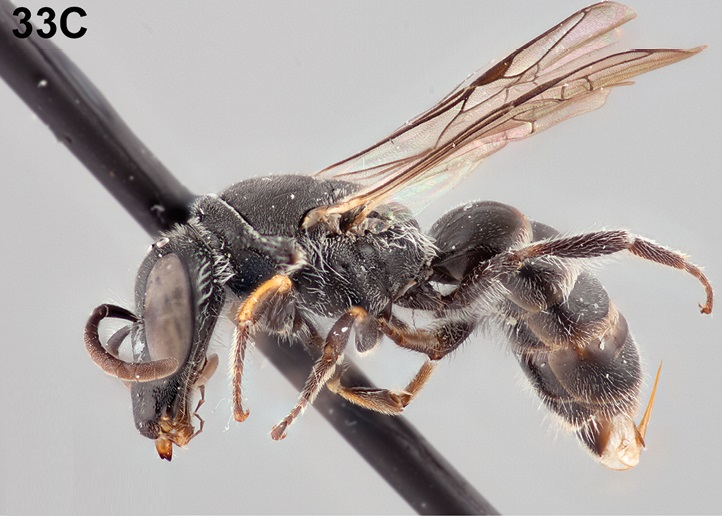
- Female Chilicola charizard

Scientific classification
- Kingdom: Animalia
- Phylum: Arthropoda
- Clade: Pancrustacea
- Class: Insecta
- Order: Hymenoptera
- Family: Colletidae
- Subfamily: Xeromelissinae
- Genus: Chilicola; Spinola, 1851

= Chilicola =

Genus of bees

Chilicola is a genus of bee comprising 15 subgenera.

== Species ==
- Chilicola aenigma
- Chilicola aequatoriensis
- Chilicola aisenensis
- Chilicola andina
- Chilicola araucana
- Chilicola ashmeadi
- Chilicola belli
- Chilicola benoistiana
- Chilicola bigibbosa
- Chilicola biguttata
- Chilicola brooksi
- Chilicola brzoskai
- Chilicola canei
- Chilicola catamarcense
- Chilicola chalcidiformis
- Chilicola charizard (Monckton, 2016)
- Chilicola chubutense
- Chilicola clavillo
- Chilicola colliguay
- Chilicola colombiana
- Chilicola cooperi
- Chilicola cupheae
- Chilicola cuzcoensis
- Chilicola dalmeidai
- Chilicola denisii
- Chilicola deserticola
- Chilicola diaguita
- Chilicola erithropoda
- Chilicola espeleticola
- Chilicola friesei
- Chilicola gibbosa
- Chilicola granulosa
- Chilicola griswoldi
- Chilicola gutierrezi
- Chilicola hahni
- Chilicola herbsti
- Chilicola huberi
- Chilicola inermis
- Chilicola involuta
- Chilicola liliana
- Chilicola lonco
- Chilicola longiceps
- Chilicola longitarsa
- Chilicola luzmarieae
- Chilicola maculipes
- Chilicola mailen
- Chilicola mantagua
- Chilicola mavida
- Chilicola megalostigma
- Chilicola mexicana
- Chilicola michelbacheri
- Chilicola minima
- Chilicola minor
- Chilicola mirzamalae
- Chilicola mistica
- Chilicola muruimuinane
- Chilicola nanula
- Chilicola neffi
- Chilicola obesifrons
- Chilicola olmue
- Chilicola orophila
- Chilicola pangue
- Chilicola paramo
- Chilicola patagonica
- Chilicola pedunculata
- Chilicola penai
- Chilicola plebeia
- Chilicola polita
- Chilicola prosopoides
- Chilicola quitensis
- Chilicola rostrata
- Chilicola rubriventris
- Chilicola sardonyx
- Chilicola setosicornis
- Chilicola simplex
- Chilicola smithpardoi
- Chilicola solervicensi
- Chilicola stenocephala
- Chilicola styliventris
- Chilicola transversaria
- Chilicola travesia
- Chilicola tregualemu
- Chilicola tricarinata
- Chilicola tricarinatoides
- Chilicola umbonata
- Chilicola unicarinata
- Chilicola valparaiso
- Chilicola venezuelana
- Chilicola venticola
- Chilicola vernalis
- Chilicola vicugna
- Chilicola vina
- Chilicola wygodzinskyi
- Chilicola xanthognatha
- Chilicola xanthostoma
- Chilicola yali
- Chilicola yanezae
