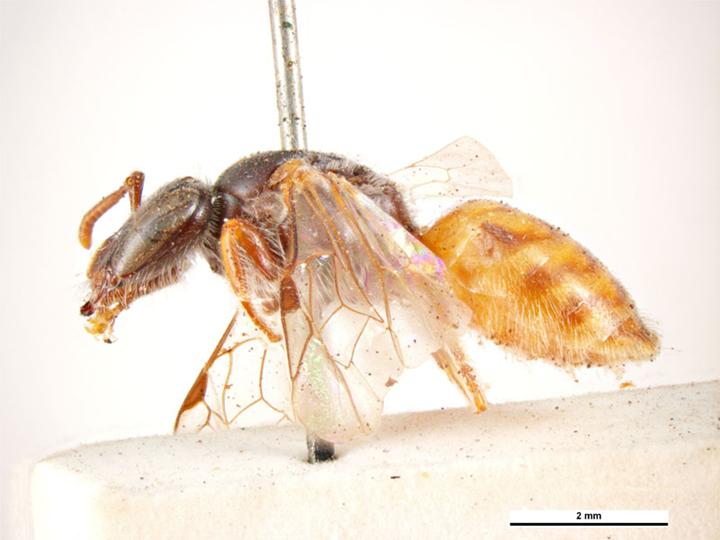
- Melittosmithia subtilis, female

Scientific classification
- Kingdom: Animalia
- Phylum: Arthropoda
- Clade: Pancrustacea
- Class: Insecta
- Order: Hymenoptera
- Superfamily: Apoidea
- Clade: Anthophila
- Family: Colletidae
- Subfamily: Euryglossinae
- Genus: Melittosmithia; Schulz, 1906

= Melittosmithia =

Genus of bees

Melittosmithia is a genus of bees in the family Colletidae and the subfamily Euryglossinae. It is endemic to Australia. It was described in 1906 by German entomologist Wilhelm Albert Schulz.

== Species ==
As of 2026 the genus contained four valid species:

- Melittosmithia adelaidae (Friese, 1924)
- Melittosmithia carinata (Smith, 1862)
- Melittosmithia froggattiana (Cockerell, 1905)
- Melittosmithia subtilis Cockerell, 1926
