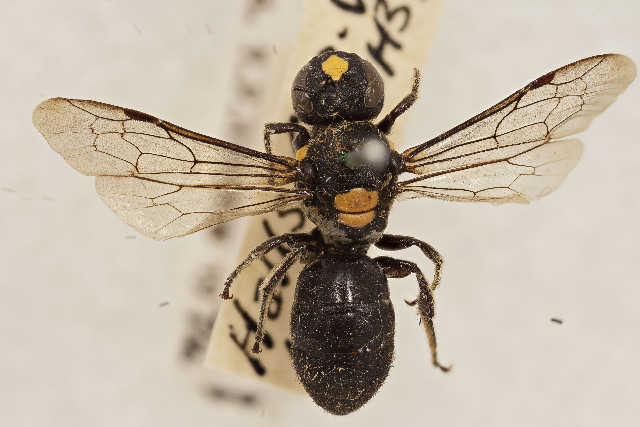

Scientific classification
- Kingdom: Animalia
- Phylum: Arthropoda
- Clade: Pancrustacea
- Class: Insecta
- Order: Hymenoptera
- Family: Colletidae
- Genus: Amphylaeus
- Species: A. morosus

Binomial name
- Amphylaeus morosus Smith, 1879

= Amphylaeus morosus =

Species of bee

Amphylaeus morosus is a species of plasterer bee, known by the common name capricious dimorphic-masked bee. It is endemic to Australia.

== Behaviour ==
A. morosus is the only species of the Colletidae family that unambiguously practices social nesting. Social nesting in this species is relatively simple, lacking reproductive hierarchies or morphological differences between nestmates.

== Ecology ==
A. morosus is known to construct linear nests out of the pithy interior of the tree-fern Alsophila australis. Species of Gasteruption wasps have been observed attacking A. morosus nests.

Alsophila australis (rough tree-fern), a nesting plant of the bees
