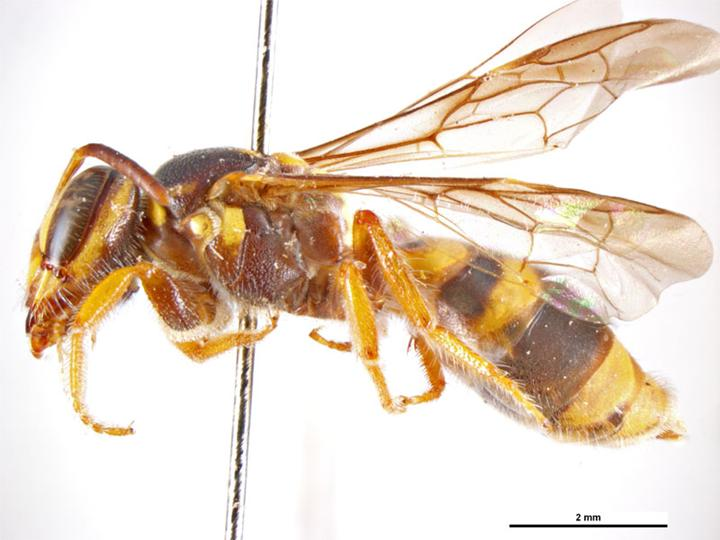
- Stenohesma nomadiformis, female

Scientific classification
- Kingdom: Animalia
- Phylum: Arthropoda
- Clade: Pancrustacea
- Class: Insecta
- Order: Hymenoptera
- Superfamily: Apoidea
- Clade: Anthophila
- Family: Colletidae
- Subfamily: Euryglossinae
- Genus: Stenohesma; Michener, 1965

= Stenohesma =

Genus of bees

Stenohesma is a monotypic genus of bees in the family Colletidae and the subfamily Euryglossinae. It is endemic to Australia. It was described in 1965 by American entomologist Charles Duncan Michener.

== Species ==
As of 2026 the genus contained one valid species:

- Stenohesma nomadiformis Michener, 1965

=== Distribution and habitat ===
The species occurs in Queensland. The type locality is Meringa. Other published localities include Herberton and Edungalba.

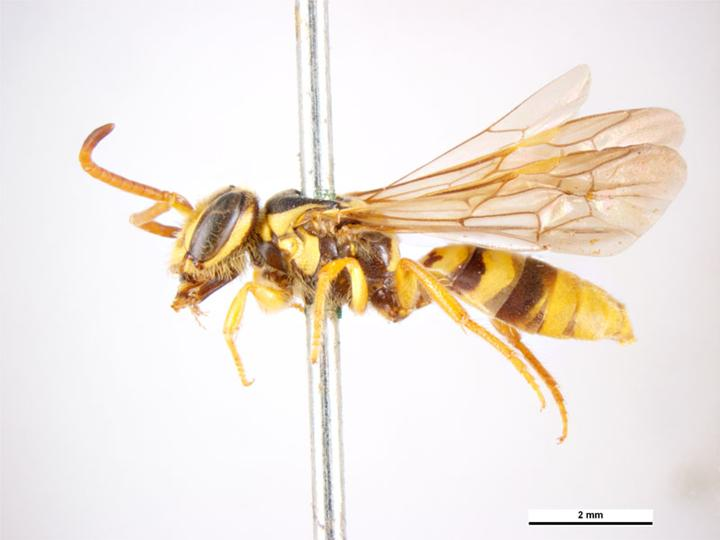
Stenohesma nomadiformis, male
