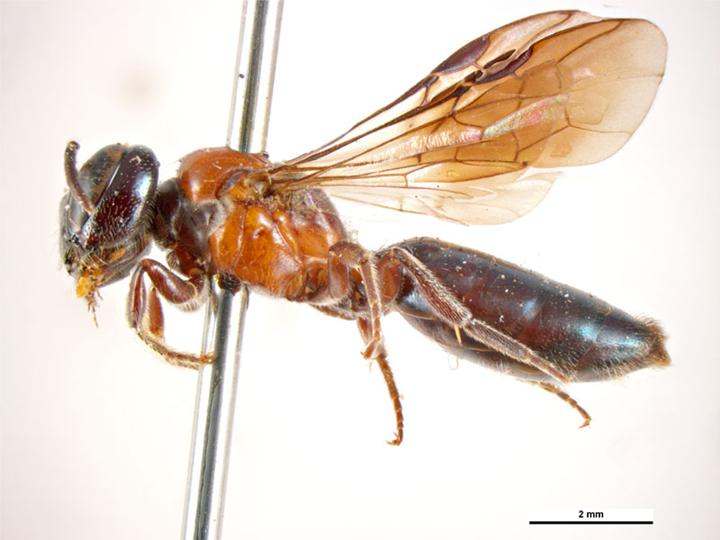
- Heterohesma weiri, male

Scientific classification
- Kingdom: Animalia
- Phylum: Arthropoda
- Clade: Pancrustacea
- Class: Insecta
- Order: Hymenoptera
- Superfamily: Apoidea
- Clade: Anthophila
- Family: Colletidae
- Subfamily: Euryglossinae
- Genus: Heterohesma; Michener, 1965

= Heterohesma =

Genus of bees

Heterohesma is a genus of bees in the family Colletidae and the subfamily Euryglossinae. It is endemic to Australia. It was described in 1965 by American entomologist Charles Duncan Michener.

== Species ==
As of 2026 the genus contained two valid species:

- Heterohesma clypeata (Rayment, 1954)
- Heterohesma weiri Exley, 1983
