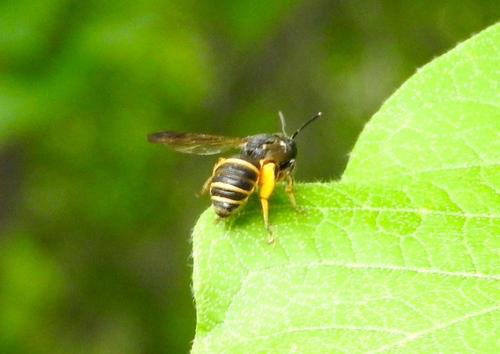

Scientific classification
- Kingdom: Animalia
- Phylum: Arthropoda
- Clade: Pancrustacea
- Class: Insecta
- Order: Hymenoptera
- Family: Colletidae
- Genus: Eulonchopria; Brèthes, 1909

= Eulonchopria =

Genus of bees

Eulonchopria is a genus of plasterer bees. They are found from Arizona to Argentina, mostly in arid or savanna areas.

== Description ==
Eulonchopria bees have yellow integumental bands and darkened costal margins that causes them to superficially resemble Eumenes wasps. Females of the species are able to fold their wings longitudinally, an unusual trait for bees, possibly to enhance this mimicry.

== Taxonomy ==
Eulonchopria contains the following species:

- Eulonchopria punctatissima
- Eulonchopria oaxacana
- Eulonchopria psaenythioides
