= Xeromelissinae =

Scientific classification
- Kingdom: Animalia
- Phylum: Arthropoda
- Clade: Pancrustacea
- Class: Insecta
- Order: Hymenoptera
- Family: Colletidae
- Subfamily: Xeromelissinae

Subfamily of plasterer bees

Xeromelissinae is a subfamily of plasterer bees. It contains approximately 200 species, all of which are endemic to the New World. They are generally found in arid habitats, mostly in temperate areas of southern South America. They are generally small in size and slender.

== Taxonomy ==
Xeromelissinae contains the following genera:

- Patagonicola
- Xenochilicola
- Geodiscelis
- Chilicola
- Xeromelissa
