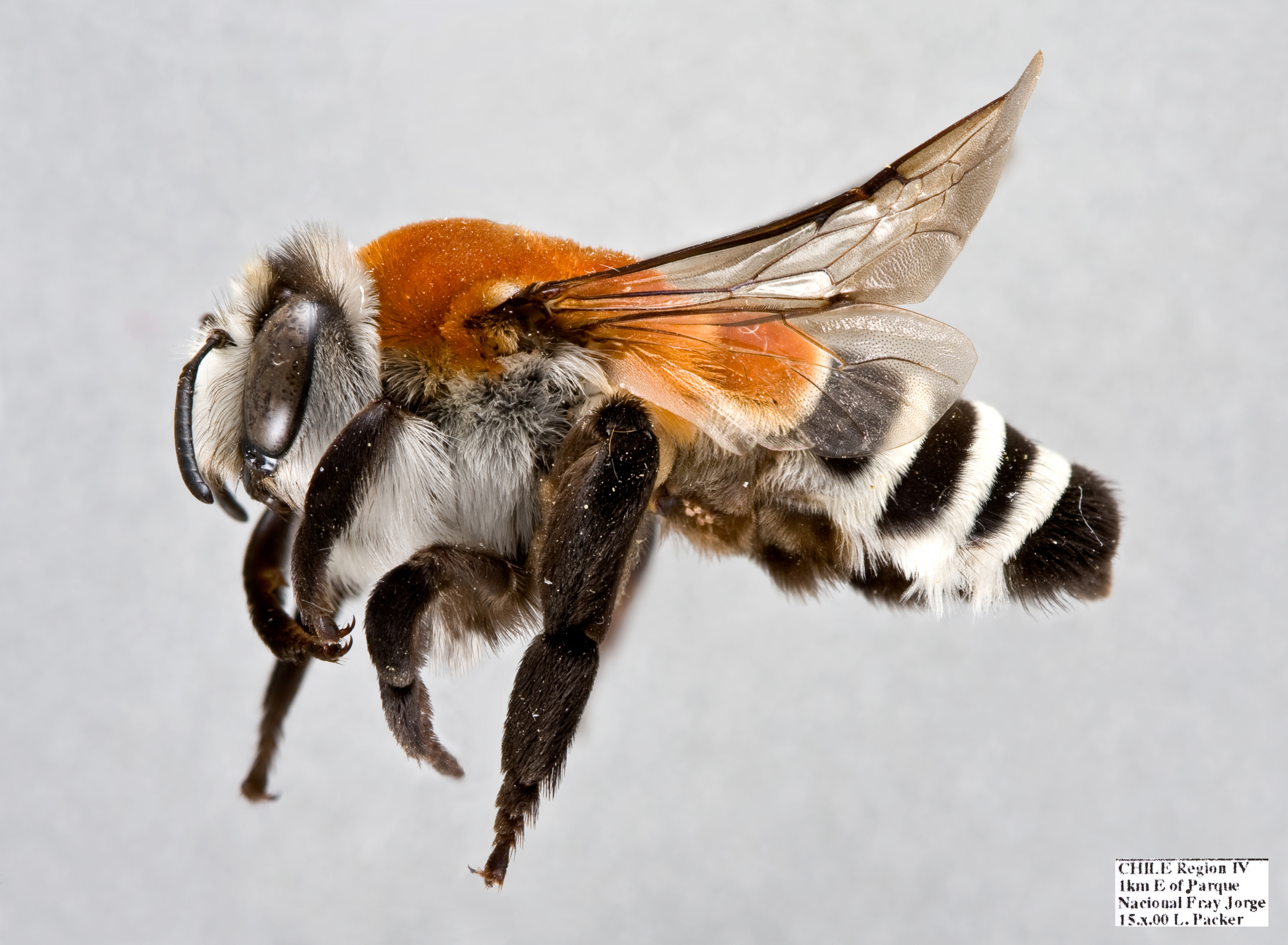
- Caupolicana fulvicollis

Scientific classification
- Kingdom: Animalia
- Phylum: Arthropoda
- Clade: Pancrustacea
- Class: Insecta
- Order: Hymenoptera
- Family: Colletidae
- Tribe: Caupolicanini
- Genus: Caupolicana; Spinola in Gay, 1851

Species
- See text

Synonyms
- Caupolicanoides Michener 1966; Megacilissa Smith 1853; Caupolicania Schulz 1906 (Lapsus); Megalocilissa Schulz 1906 (Lapsus); Zikanapis (Foersterapis) Moure, 1964

= Caupolicana =

Genus of bees

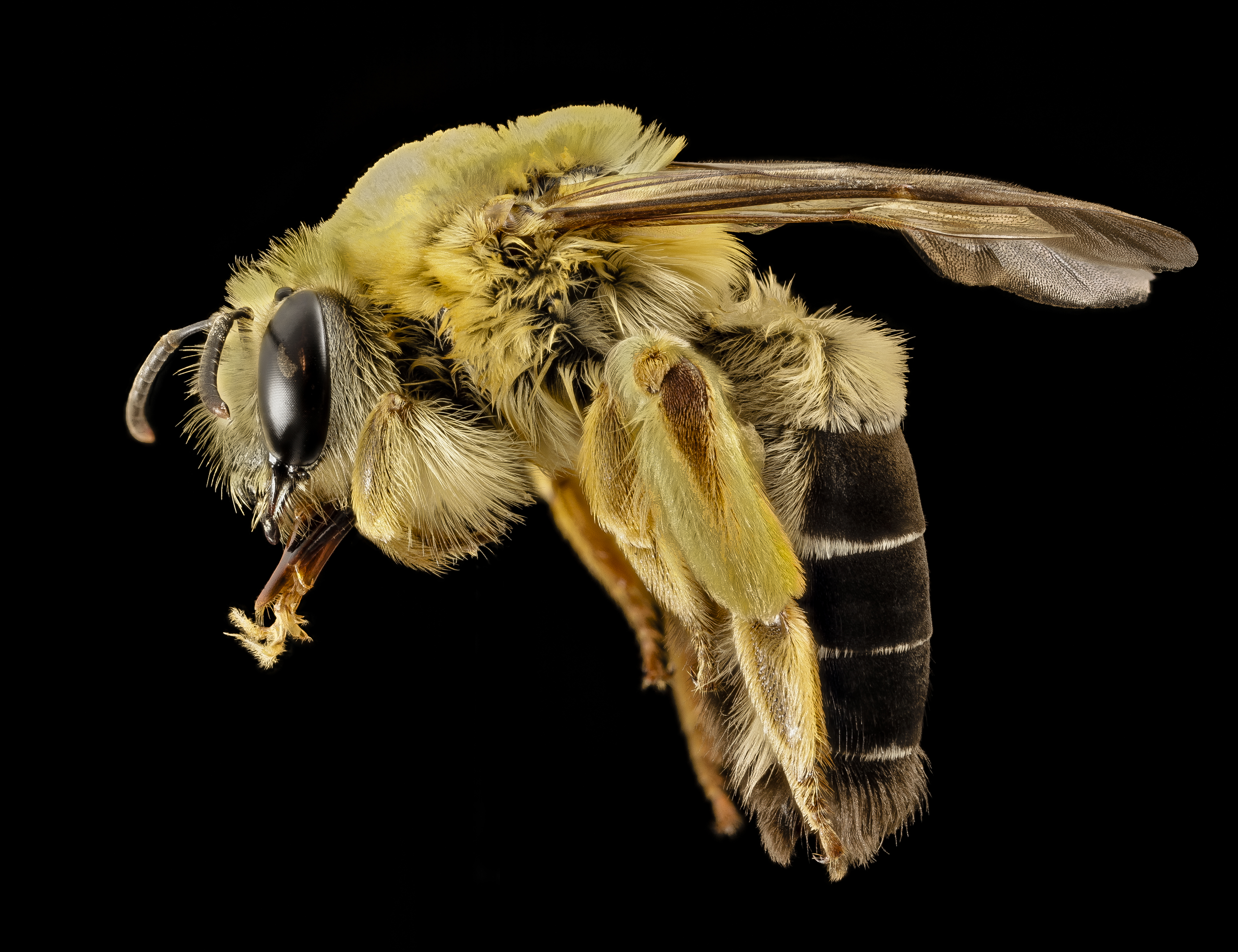
Caupolicana electa

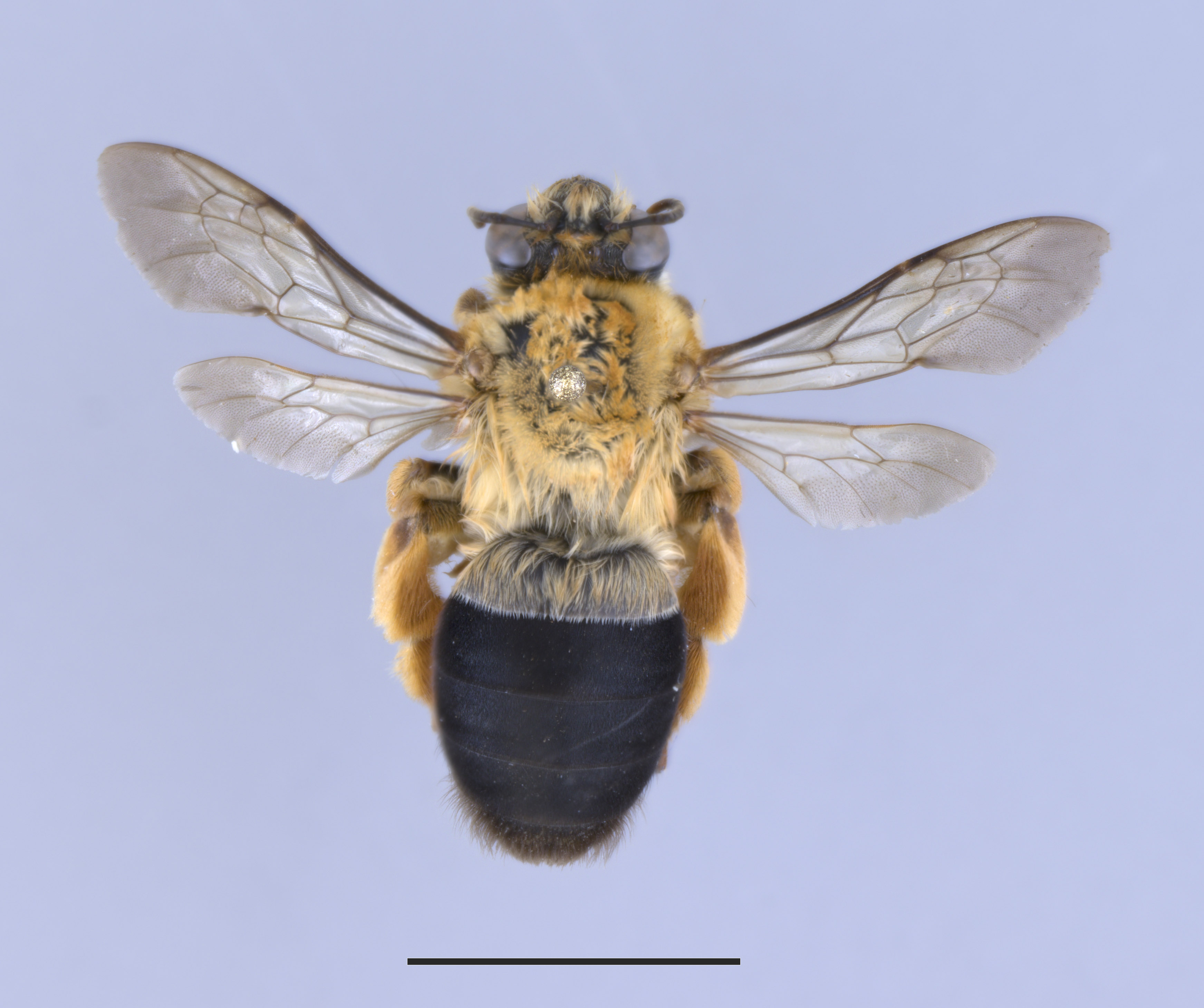
Dorsal view of a Caupolicana electa Cresson, 1878 specimen collected from Treutlen County, Georgia on October 3, 2024. Scale bar indicates 10 mm.

Caupolicana is a genus of bees in the family Colletidae, native to the Americas; most species are crepuscular in habit, visiting flowers only at dawn and/or dusk. There are over 50 known species, in 4 subgenera (some of which have been historically treated as valid genera).

== Subgenera and Species ==
Subgenus Alayoapis Michener, 1966

- Caupolicana nigrescens (Cresson, 1869)
- Caupolicana notabilis (Smith, 1861)
- Caupolicana subaurata (Cresson, 1869)

Subgenus Caupolicana (s.s.)

- Caupolicana adusta Friese, 1899
- Caupolicana albiventris Friese, 1904
- Caupolicana bicolor Friese, 1899
- Caupolicana curvipes Friese, 1898
- Caupolicana dimidiata Herbst, 1917
- Caupolicana egregia Friese, 1906
- Caupolicana electa (Cresson, 1878)
- Caupolicana evansi Vergara and Michener, 2004
- Caupolicana floridana Michener and Deyrup, 2004
- Caupolicana friesei Jörgensen, 1909
- Caupolicana fulvicollis Spinola, 1851
- Caupolicana funebris Smith, 1879
- Caupolicana gaullei Vachal, 1901
- Caupolicana gayi Spinola, 1851
- Caupolicana hirsuta Spinola, 1851
- Caupolicana lugubris Smith, 1879
- Caupolicana mendocina Jörgensen, 1909
- Caupolicana mystica Schrottky, 1902
- Caupolicana nigriventris Friese, 1904
- Caupolicana niveofasciata Friese, 1898
- Caupolicana ocellata Michener, 1966
- Caupolicana ochracea (Friese, 1906)
- Caupolicana peruviana Friese, 1900
- Caupolicana piurensis Cockerell, 1911
- Caupolicana pubescens Smith, 1879
- Caupolicana quadrifasciata Friese, 1898
- Caupolicana ruficollis Friese, 1906
- Caupolicana smithiana Friese, 1908
- Caupolicana specca Snelling, 1975
- Caupolicana steinbachi Friese, 1906
- Caupolicana vestita (Smith, 1879)
- Caupolicana weyrauchi Moure, 1953
- Caupolicana yarrowi (Cresson, 1875)

Subgenus Willinkapis Moure, 1953

- Caupolicana chalybaea (Friese, 1906)
- Caupolicana melanotricha (Moure, 1969)
- Caupolicana perornata (Moure, 1969)

Subgenus Zikanapis Moure, 1945

- Caupolicana brethesi (Compagnucci, 2006)
- Caupolicana clypeata (Smith, 1879)
- Caupolicana copo (Compagnucci, 2006)
- Caupolicana elegans Timberlake, 1965
- Caupolicana foersteri (Moure & Seabra, 1962)
- Caupolicana funeraria (Moure, 1964)
- Caupolicana inbio Michener, Engel & Ayala, 2003
- Caupolicana megalopta (Moure, 1948)
- Caupolicana modesta (Moure, 1964)
- Caupolicana rozenorum Michener, Engel & Ayala, 2003
- Caupolicana seabrai (Moure, 1953)
- Caupolicana tucumana Moure, 1945
- Caupolicana wileyi Michener & Engel, 2009
- Caupolicana zikani (Friese, 1925)
