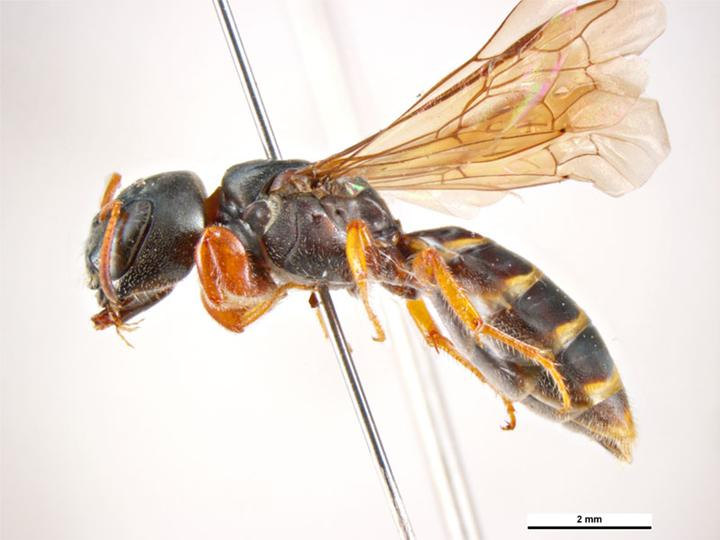
- Sericogaster fasciata

Scientific classification
- Kingdom: Animalia
- Phylum: Arthropoda
- Class: Insecta
- Order: Hymenoptera
- Family: Colletidae
- Genus: Sericogaster; Westwood, 1835
- Species: S. fasciata

Binomial name
- Sericogaster fasciata Westwood, 1835

= Sericogaster =

Genus of bees

Sericogaster is a monotypic genus of bees belonging to the family Colletidae. The only species is Sericogaster fasciata.

The species is found in Australia.
