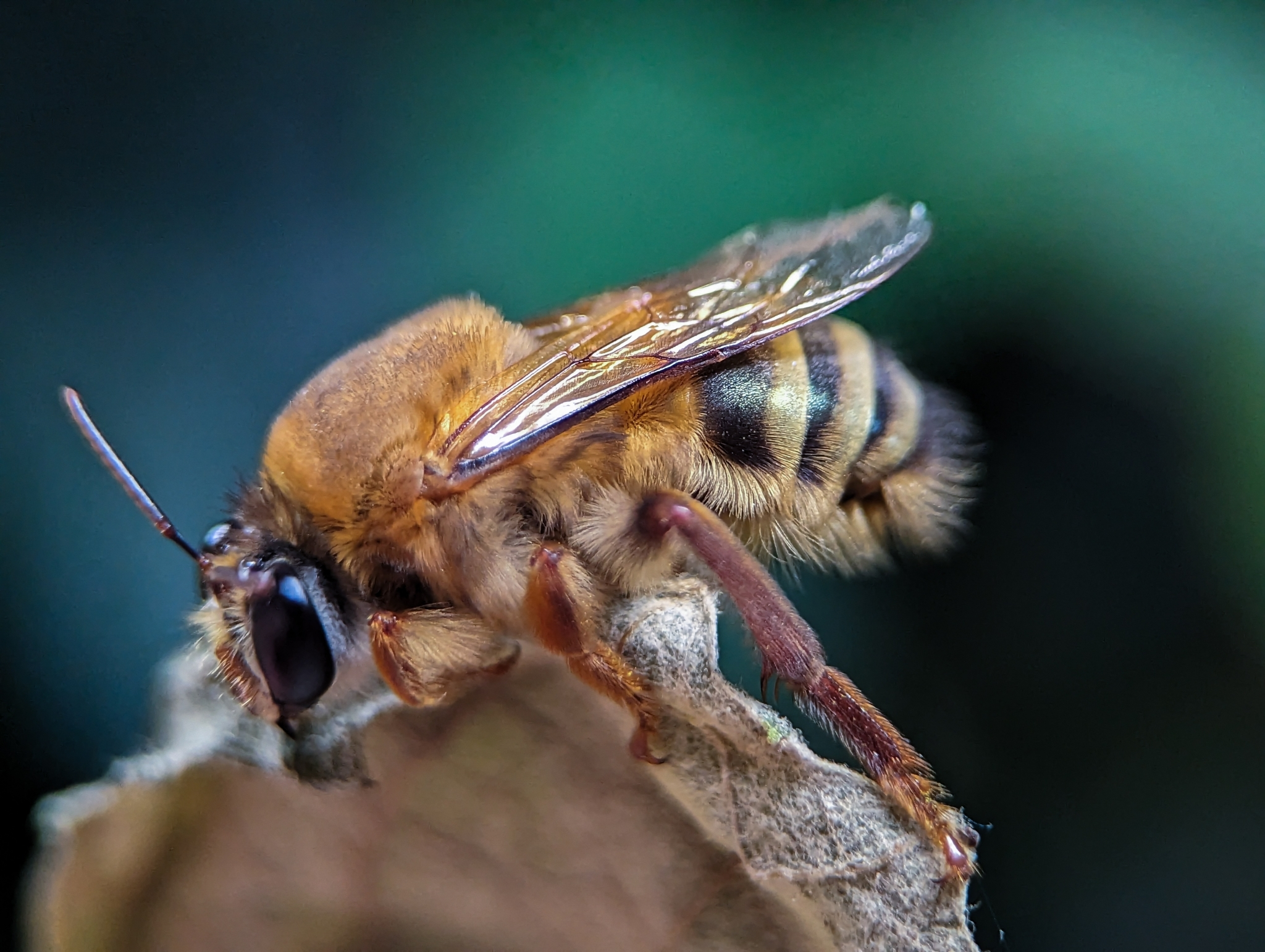
- Ptiloglossa styphlaspis

Scientific classification
- Kingdom: Animalia
- Phylum: Arthropoda
- Class: Insecta
- Order: Hymenoptera
- Family: Colletidae
- Tribe: Caupolicanini
- Genus: Ptiloglossa; Smith, 1853

= Ptiloglossa =

Genus of bees

Ptiloglossa is a small genus of bees within the family Colletidae, endemic to the Americas. Ptiloglossa is one of the most common nocturnal groups of colletids.

== Distribution ==
The species of Ptiloglossa are most diverse (over 50 species) in South America and Central America. Three species, Ptiloglossa arizonensis, P. jonesi, and P. mexicana, occur in the Southwestern United States.

== Description ==
Ptiloglossa consists of generally large, hairy species which are temporally-specialized crepuscular pollinators. They have greatly enlarged ocelli to assist them in flying under very low light levels.

== Life History ==
They are active only at sundown (vespertine) or more typically at pre-dawn (matinal). They often utilize a pollen-extraction behavior known as buzz pollination. Like most colletids, these bees have liquid larval provisions sealed inside a membranous, cellophane-like cell lining, and it is believed that yeasts in the liquid may act as the primary protein source.

== Species ==
These 55 species belong to the genus Ptiloglossa:

- Ptiloglossa absurdipes Friese, 1908^{i c g}
- Ptiloglossa aculeata Friese, 1904^{i c g}
- Ptiloglossa aenigmatica Moure, 1945^{i c g}
- Ptiloglossa amita Moure, 1987^{i c g}
- Ptiloglossa arizonensis Timberlake, 1946^{i c g}
- Ptiloglossa buchwaldi Friese, 1908^{i c g}
- Ptiloglossa concinna Moure, 1987^{i c g}
- Ptiloglossa costaricana Moure, 1945^{i c g}
- Ptiloglossa cyaniventris Friese, 1925^{i c g}
- Ptiloglossa decipiens Moure, 1987^{i c g}
- Ptiloglossa decora Moure, 1945^{i c g}
- Ptiloglossa dubia Moure, 1945^{i c g}
- Ptiloglossa ducalis Smith, 1853^{i c g}
- Ptiloglossa eburnea Friese, 1904^{i c g}
- Ptiloglossa eximia (Smith, 1861)^{i c g}
- Ptiloglossa fassli Friese, 1925^{i c g}
- Ptiloglossa fulvonigra Moure, 1987^{i c g}
- Ptiloglossa fulvopilosa (Cameron, 1903)^{i c g}
- Ptiloglossa generosa (Smith, 1879)^{i c g}
- Ptiloglossa giacomelli Schrottky, 1914^{i c g}
- Ptiloglossa goffergei Moure, 1953^{i c g}
- Ptiloglossa guinnae Roberts, 1971^{i c g}
- Ptiloglossa hemileuca Moure, 1944^{i c g}
- Ptiloglossa hondurasica Cockerell, 1949^{i c g}
- Ptiloglossa hoplopoda Moure, 1987^{i c g}
- Ptiloglossa immixta Moure, 1945^{i c g}
- Ptiloglossa jonesi Timberlake, 1946^{i c g}
- Ptiloglossa lanosa Moure, 1945^{i c g}
- Ptiloglossa latecalcarata Moure, 1945^{i c g}
- Ptiloglossa lucernarum Cockerell, 1923^{i c g}
- Ptiloglossa magrettii (Friese, 1899)^{i c g}
- Ptiloglossa matutina (Schrottky, 1904)^{i c g}
- Ptiloglossa mayarum Cockerell, 1912^{i c g}
- Ptiloglossa mexicana (Cresson, 1878)^{i c g b}
- Ptiloglossa olivacea (Friese, 1898)^{i c g}
- Ptiloglossa ollantayi Cockerell, 1911^{i c g}
- Ptiloglossa pallida Friese, 1925^{i c g}
- Ptiloglossa pallipes Friese, 1908^{i c g}
- Ptiloglossa pretiosa (Friese, 1898)^{i c g}
- Ptiloglossa psednozona Moure, 1947^{i c g}
- Ptiloglossa rugata Moure, 1945^{i c g}
- Ptiloglossa stafuzzai Moure, 1945^{i c g}
- Ptiloglossa steinheili Friese, 1899^{i c g}
- Ptiloglossa styphlaspis Moure, 1945^{i c g}
- Ptiloglossa tarsata (Friese, 1900)^{i c g}
- Ptiloglossa tenuimarginata (Smith, 1879)^{i c g}
- Ptiloglossa thoracica (Fox, 1895)^{i c g}
- Ptiloglossa tomentosa (Friese, 1898)^{i c}
- Ptiloglossa torquata Moure, 1987^{i c g}
- Ptiloglossa trichrootricha Moure, 1987^{i c g}
- Ptiloglossa virgili (Friese, 1900)^{i c g}
- Ptiloglossa willinki Moure, 1953^{i c g}
- Ptiloglossa wilmattae Cockerell, 1949^{i c g}
- Ptiloglossa xanthorhina Moure, 1945^{i c g}
- Ptiloglossa xanthotricha Moure, 1945^{i c g}

Data sources: i = ITIS, c = Catalogue of Life, g = GBIF, b = Bugguide.net

== See also ==
- Bees−related topics
- Colletidae genera and species
- Hymenoptera of North America
- Hymenoptera of South America
