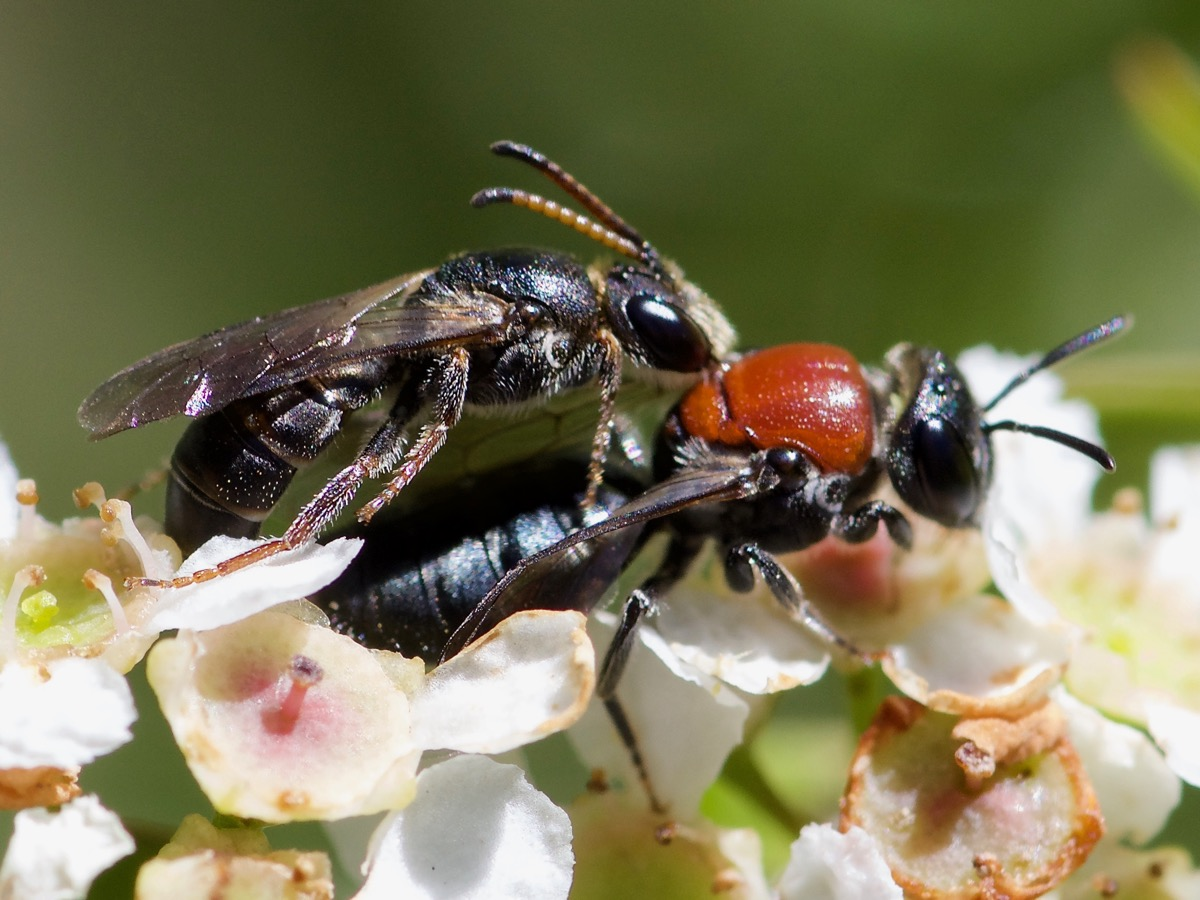
- Euryglossa adelaidae in copula

Scientific classification
- Kingdom: Animalia
- Phylum: Arthropoda
- Clade: Pancrustacea
- Class: Insecta
- Order: Hymenoptera
- Family: Colletidae
- Subfamily: Euryglossinae; Michener, 1965

= Euryglossinae =

Subfamily of bees

Euryglossinae is a subfamily of plasterer bees endemic to Australia. Most of the 400+ species in the subfamily are very small, with the largest reaching 10 mm in length. Females of this subfamily carry pollen internally, in the crop.

== Taxonomy ==
Euryglossinae contains the following genera:

- Brachyhesma Michener, 1965
- Callohesma Michener, 1965
- Dasyhesma Michener, 1965
- Euhesma Michener, 1965
- Euryglossa Smith, 1853
- Euryglossina Cockerell, 1910
- Euryglossula Michener, 1965
- Heterohesma Michener, 1965
- Hyphesma Michener, 1965
- Melittosmithia Schulz, 1906
- Pachyprosopis Perkins, 1908
- Sericogaster Westwood, 1835
- Stenohesma Michener, 1965
- Tumidihesma Exley, 1996
- Xanthesma Michener, 1965
