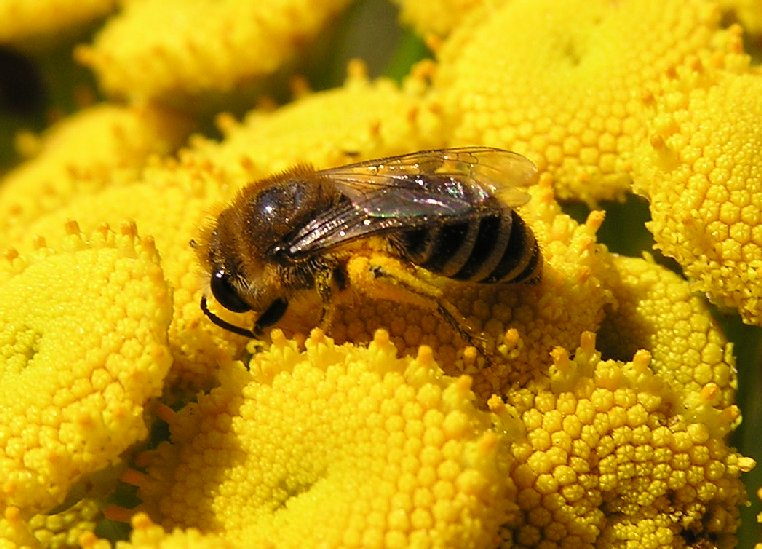
- Colletes daviesanus

Scientific classification
- Kingdom: Animalia
- Phylum: Arthropoda
- Clade: Pancrustacea
- Class: Insecta
- Order: Hymenoptera
- Clade: Anthophila
- Family: Colletidae; Lepeletier, 1841

Subfamilies
- Colletinae; Diphaglossinae; Euryglossinae; Hylaeinae; Xeromelissinae

= Colletidae =

Family of bees

The Colletidae are a family of bees, and are often referred to collectively as plasterer bees or polyester bees, due to the method of smoothing the walls of their nest cells with secretions applied with their mouthparts; these secretions dry into a cellophane-like lining. The five subfamilies, 54 genera, and over 2000 species are all evidently solitary (with the known exception of but one species, Amphylaeus morosus), though many nest in aggregations. Two of the subfamilies, Euryglossinae and Hylaeinae, lack the external pollen-carrying apparatus (the scopa) that otherwise characterizes most bees, and instead carry the pollen in their crops. These groups, and most genera in this family, have liquid or semiliquid pollen masses on which the larvae develop.

They can be found all over the world, but the most species live in South America and Australia. Over 50% of all bee species living in Australia belong to this family. Only the genera Colletes and Hylaeus can be found in Europe, while in the Western Hemisphere, in addition to these two, the genera Caupolicana, Eulonchopria, and Ptiloglossa are found.

Australian genera include Euhesma, a large genus, members of which has been split off into other genera such as Euryglossa and Callohesma.

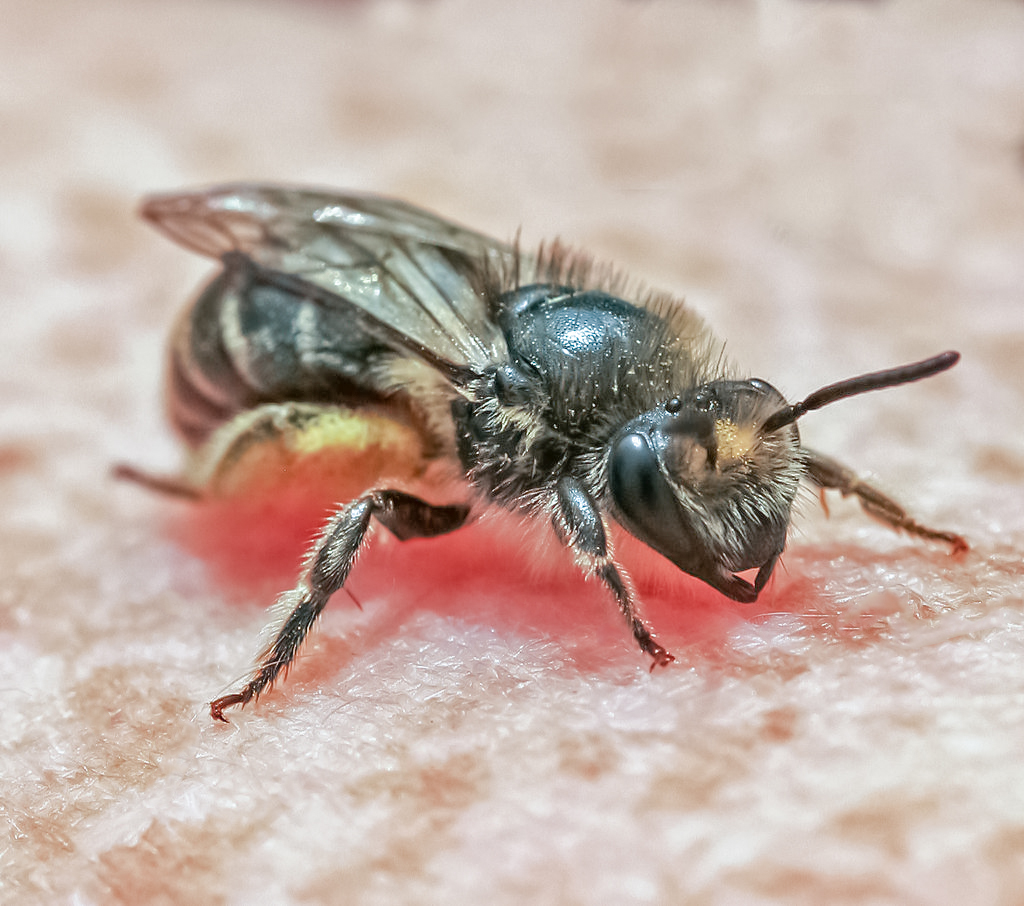
Unequal cellophane bee (Colletes inaequalis)

Traditionally, this family was believed to be likely the most "primitive" among extant bees, based primarily on the similarities of their mouthparts (the unique possession among bees of a bilobed glossa) to those of the Crabronidae, a paraphyletic group some of whose members are sister to the Anthophila (bees). However, recent molecular studies have shown that the Melittidae (sensu lato) are actually sister to all other bees.

== "Nocturnal" species ==
The Colletidae are one of the four bee families that contain some crepuscular species (of both the "vespertine" and "matinal" types). These bees, as is typical in such cases, have greatly enlarged ocelli. The other families with some crepuscular species are Andrenidae, Halictidae, and Apidae.

== Systematics ==
- Subfamily Colletinae — worldwide
  - Tribe Paracolletini
    - Brachyglossula
    - Callomelitta
    - Chrysocolletes
    - Eulonchopria
    - Glossurocolletes
    - Hesperocolletes
    - Leioproctus
    - Lonchopria
    - Lonchorhyncha
    - Neopasiphae
    - Niltonia
    - Paracolletes
    - Phenacolletes
    - Trichocolletes
  - Tribe Colletini
    - Colletes
    - Mourecotelles
  - Tribe Scraptrini
    - Scrapter
- Subfamily Diphaglossinae — Americas
  - Tribe Caupolicanini
    - Caupolicana
    - Crawfordapis
    - Ptiloglossa
  - Tribe Diphaglossini
    - Cadeguala
    - Cadegualina
    - Diphaglossa
  - Tribe Dissoglottini
    - Mydrosoma
    - Mydrosomella
    - Ptiloglossidia
- Subfamily Xeromelissinae — tropical Americas
  - Chilicola
  - Chilimelissa
  - Geodiscelis
  - Xenochilicola
  - Xeromelissa

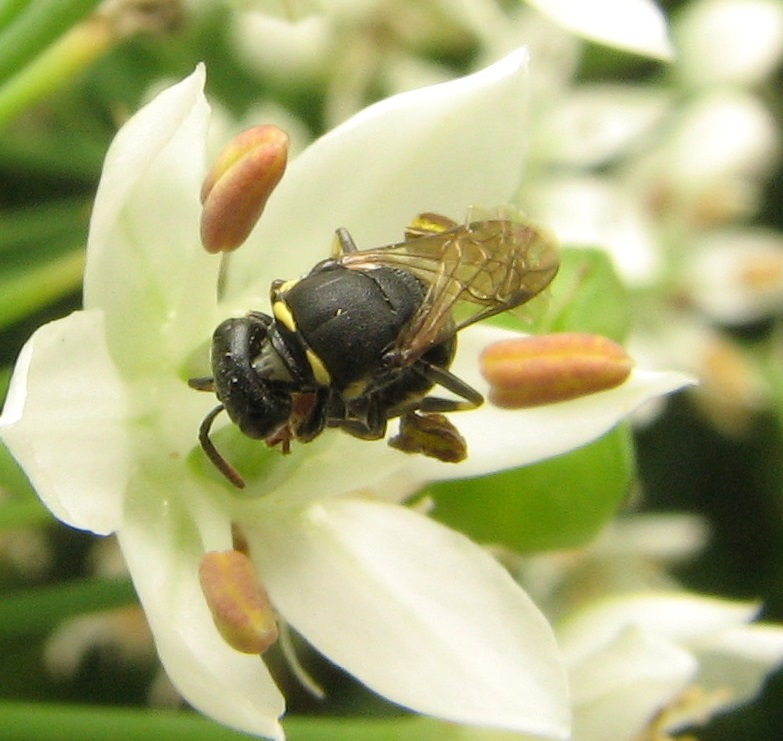
Hylaeus sp. on Allium flower.

- Subfamily Hylaeinae — yellow-faced bees, worldwide
  - Amphylaeus
  - Hemirhiza
  - Hylaeus
  - Hyleoides
  - Meroglossa
  - Palaeorhiza
  - Xenorhiza
- Subfamily Euryglossinae — Australian
  - Brachyhesma
  - Callohesma
  - Dasyhesma
  - Euhesma
  - Euryglossa
  - Euryglossina
  - Euryglossula
  - Heterohesma
  - Hyphesma
  - Melittosmithia
  - Pachyprosopis
  - Sericogaster
  - Stenohesma
  - Tumidihesma
  - Xanthesma
