= List of Euhesma species =

This is a list of 90 described species in the bee genus Euhesma:

== Species ==
- Euhesma acantha Exley, 2004
- Euhesma albamala Hogendoorn & Leijs, 2015
- Euhesma alicia (Exley, 1998)
- Euhesma allunga Exley, 2001
- Euhesma altitudinis (Cockerell, 1914)
- Euhesma anthracocephala (Cockerell, 1914)
- Euhesma atra (Exley, 1998)
- Euhesma aulaca Hogendoorn & Leijs, 2015
- Euhesma aurata (Exley, 1998)
- Euhesma aureophila (Houston, 1992)
- Euhesma australis (Michener, 1965)
- Euhesma balladonia (Exley, 1998)
- Euhesma banksia Exley, 2001
- Euhesma bronzus Exley, 2001
- Euhesma catanii (Rayment, 1949)
- Euhesma collaris Exley, 2004
- Euhesma coppinensis (Exley, 1998)
- Euhesma crabronica (Cockerell, 1914)
- Euhesma cuneifolia (Exley, 1998)
- Euhesma dolichocephala (Rayment, 1953)
- Euhesma dongara Exley, 2001
- Euhesma endeavouricola (Strand, 1921)
- Euhesma evansi Exley, 2002
- Euhesma fasciatella (Cockerell, 1907)
- Euhesma filicis (Cockerell, 1926)
- Euhesma flavocuneata (Cockerell, 1915)
- Euhesma goodeniae (Cockerell, 1926)
- Euhesma granitica (Exley, 1998)
- Euhesma grisea (Alfken, 1907)
- Euhesma halictina (Cockerell, 1920)
- Euhesma hemichlora (Cockerell, 1914)
- Euhesma hemixantha (Cockerell, 1914)
- Euhesma hyphesmoides (Michener, 1965)
- Euhesma inconspicua (Cockerell, 1913)
- Euhesma latissima (Cockerell, 1914)
- Euhesma leonora (Exley, 1998)
- Euhesma lobata Exley, 2001
- Euhesma loorea Exley, 2004
- Euhesma lucida Exley, 2002
- Euhesma lutea (Rayment, 1934)
- Euhesma lyngouriae Hogendoorn & Leijs, 2015
- Euhesma macrayae (Exley, 1998)
- Euhesma maculifera (Michener, 1965)
- Euhesma malaris (Michener, 1965)
- Euhesma maura (Cockerell, 1927)
- Euhesma meeka (Exley, 1998)
- Euhesma melanosoma (Cockerell, 1914)
- Euhesma micans Hogendoorn & Leijs, 2015
- Euhesma morrisoni (Houston, 1992)
- Euhesma nalbarra (Exley, 1998)
- Euhesma neglectula (Cockerell, 1905)
- Euhesma newmanensis (Exley, 1998)
- Euhesma nitidifrons (Smith, 1879)
- Euhesma nubifera (Cockerell, 1922)
- Euhesma palpalis (Michener, 1965)
- Euhesma pantoni (Exley, 1998)
- Euhesma perditiformis (Cockerell, 1910)
- Euhesma perkinsi (Michener, 1965)
- Euhesma pernana (Cockerell, 1905)
- Euhesma platyrhina (Cockerell, 1915)
- Euhesma rainbowi (Cockerell, 1929)
- Euhesma ricae (Rayment, 1948)
- Euhesma ridens (Cockerell, 1913)
- Euhesma rufiventris (Michener, 1965)
- Euhesma scoparia (Exley, 1998)
- Euhesma semaphore (Houston, 1992)
- Euhesma serrata (Cockerell, 1927)
- Euhesma spinola Exley, 2001
- Euhesma sturtiensis (Exley, 1998)
- Euhesma subinconspicua (Rayment, 1934)
- Euhesma sulcata (Exley, 1998)
- Euhesma sybilae Exley, 2001
- Euhesma symmetra (Exley, 1998)
- Euhesma tarsata (Alfken, 1907)
- Euhesma tasmanica (Cockerell, 1918)
- Euhesma thala Exley, 2002
- Euhesma tuberculata (Rayment, 1939)
- Euhesma tuberculipes (Michener, 1965)
- Euhesma tubulifera (Houston, 1983)
- Euhesma undeneya Exley, 2002
- Euhesma undulata (Cockerell, 1914)
- Euhesma viridescens Exley, 2001
- Euhesma wahlenbergiae (Michener, 1965)
- Euhesma walkeri (Exley, 1998)
- Euhesma walkeriana (Cockerell, 1905)
- Euhesma wiluna (Exley, 1998)
- Euhesma wowine Exley, 2002
- Euhesma xana Exley, 2001
- Euhesma yeatsi Exley, 2002
- Euhesma yellowdinensis (Exley, 1998)
