= Euhesma symmetra =

Scientific classification
- Kingdom: Animalia
- Phylum: Arthropoda
- Clade: Pancrustacea
- Class: Insecta
- Order: Hymenoptera
- Family: Colletidae
- Genus: Euhesma
- Species: E. symmetra

Binomial name
- Euhesma symmetra (Exley, 1998)

Synonyms
- Euryglossa (Euhesma) symmetra Exley, 1998

Species of bee

Euhesma symmetra, or Euhesma (Euhesma) symmetra, is a species of bee in the family Colletidae and the subfamily Euryglossinae. It is endemic to Australia. It was described in 1998 by Australian entomologist Elizabeth Exley.

== Etymology ==
The specific epithet symmetra (Latin: 'similar') refers to the similarity of this species to Euhesma nalbarra.

== Description ==
Body length of the female is 6.8 mm, wing length 4.0 mm. Colouration is mainly black, brown and yellow.

== Distribution and habitat ==
The species occurs in Western Australia. The type locality is 21 km east of Meekatharra, in the Mid West region.

== Behaviour ==
The adults are flying mellivores. Flowering plants visited by the bees include Eremophila species.
