= Euhesma nubifera =

Scientific classification
- Kingdom: Animalia
- Phylum: Arthropoda
- Clade: Pancrustacea
- Class: Insecta
- Order: Hymenoptera
- Family: Colletidae
- Genus: Euhesma
- Species: E. nubifera

Binomial name
- Euhesma nubifera (Cockerell, 1922)

Synonyms
- Euryglossa nubifera Cockerell, 1922

Species of bee

Euhesma nubifera, or Euhesma (Euhesma) nubifera, is a species of bee in the family Colletidae and the subfamily Euryglossinae. It is endemic to Australia. It was described in 1922 by British-American entomologist Theodore Dru Alison Cockerell.

== Description ==
Female body length is nearly 8 mm; male body length is about 6 mm. Colouring is mainly black.

== Distribution and habitat ==
The species occurs in Queensland. The type locality is Coolangatta.

== Behaviour ==
The adults are flying mellivores.
