= Euhesma tuberculata =

Scientific classification
- Kingdom: Animalia
- Phylum: Arthropoda
- Clade: Pancrustacea
- Class: Insecta
- Order: Hymenoptera
- Family: Colletidae
- Genus: Euhesma
- Species: E. tuberculata

Binomial name
- Euhesma tuberculata (Rayment, 1939)

Synonyms
- Euryglossa maculata tuberculata Rayment, 1939

Species of bee

Euhesma tuberculata, or Euhesma (Euhesma) tuberculata, is a species of bee in the family Colletidae and the subfamily Euryglossinae. It is endemic to Australia. It was described in 1939 by Australian entomologist Tarlton Rayment.

== Distribution and habitat ==
The species occurs in New South Wales. The type locality is Gosford, on the Central Coast.

== Behaviour ==
The adults are flying mellivores.
