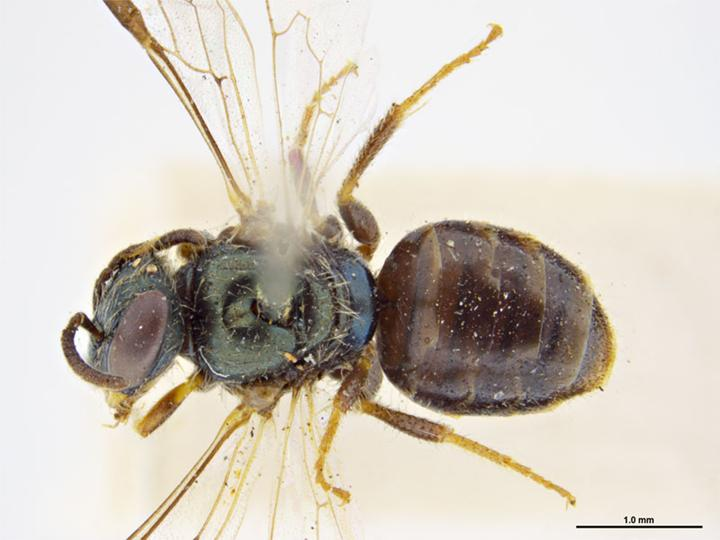
- Female

Scientific classification
- Kingdom: Animalia
- Phylum: Arthropoda
- Clade: Pancrustacea
- Class: Insecta
- Order: Hymenoptera
- Family: Colletidae
- Genus: Euhesma
- Species: E. walkeriana

Binomial name
- Euhesma walkeriana (Cockerell, 1905)

Synonyms
- Euryglossa walkeriana Cockerell, 1905

= Euhesma walkeriana =

Species of bee

Euhesma walkeriana, or Euhesma (Euhesma) walkeriana, is a species of bee in the family Colletidae and the subfamily Euryglossinae. It is endemic to Australia. It was described in 1905 by British-American entomologist Theodore Dru Alison Cockerell.

== Distribution and habitat ==
The species occurs in eastern Australia. The type locality is Launceston, Tasmania. It has also been recorded from Hobart in Tasmania as well as from south-eastern Queensland.

== Behaviour ==
The adults are flying mellivores. Flowering plants visited by the bees include Banksia species.
