= Euhesma filicis =

Scientific classification
- Kingdom: Animalia
- Phylum: Arthropoda
- Clade: Pancrustacea
- Class: Insecta
- Order: Hymenoptera
- Family: Colletidae
- Genus: Euhesma
- Species: E. filicis

Binomial name
- Euhesma filicis (Cockerell, 1926)

Synonyms
- Euryglossa nitidifrons filicis Cockerell, 1926

Species of bee

Euhesma filicis, or Euhesma (Euhesma) filicis, is a species of bee in the family Colletidae and the subfamily Euryglossinae. It is endemic to Australia. It was described in 1926 by British-American entomologist Theodore Dru Alison Cockerell.

== Distribution and habitat ==
The species occurs in Victoria. The type locality is Ferntree Gully.

== Behaviour ==
The adults are flying mellivores.
