= Euhesma serrata =

Scientific classification
- Kingdom: Animalia
- Phylum: Arthropoda
- Clade: Pancrustacea
- Class: Insecta
- Order: Hymenoptera
- Family: Colletidae
- Genus: Euhesma
- Species: E. serrata

Binomial name
- Euhesma serrata (Cockerell, 1927)

Synonyms
- Euryglossa nitidifrons serrata Cockerell, 1927

Species of bee

Euhesma serrata, or Euhesma (Euhesma) serrata, is a species of bee in the family Colletidae and the subfamily Euryglossinae. It is endemic to Australia. It was described in 1927 by British-American entomologist Theodore Dru Alison Cockerell.

== Distribution and habitat ==
The species occurs in Victoria. The type locality is Beaumaris.

== Behaviour ==
The adults are solitary flying mellivores, which nest in soil, with sedentary larvae. Flowering plants visited by the bees include Leptospermum species.
