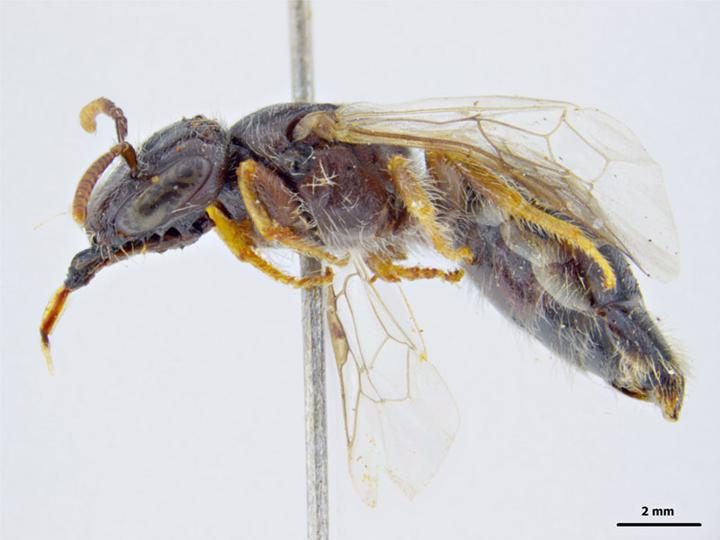
- Female

Scientific classification
- Kingdom: Animalia
- Phylum: Arthropoda
- Clade: Pancrustacea
- Class: Insecta
- Order: Hymenoptera
- Family: Colletidae
- Genus: Euhesma
- Species: E. wiluna

Binomial name
- Euhesma wiluna (Exley, 1998)

Synonyms
- Euryglossa (Euhesma) wiluna Exley, 1998

= Euhesma wiluna =

Species of bee

Euhesma wiluna, or Euhesma (Euhesma) wiluna, is a species of bee in the family Colletidae and the subfamily Euryglossinae. It is endemic to Australia. It was described in 1998 by Australian entomologist Elizabeth Exley.

== Etymology ==
The specific epithet wiluna refers to the type locality.

== Description ==
Body length of the female is 6.0 mm, wing length 4.0 mm. Colouration is mainly black, dark brown and yellowish.

== Distribution and habitat ==
The species occurs in inland Western Australia. The type locality is 42 km south-south-east of Wiluna, in the Goldfields–Esperance region.

== Behaviour ==
The adults are flying mellivores. Flowering plants visited by the bees include Eremophila species.
