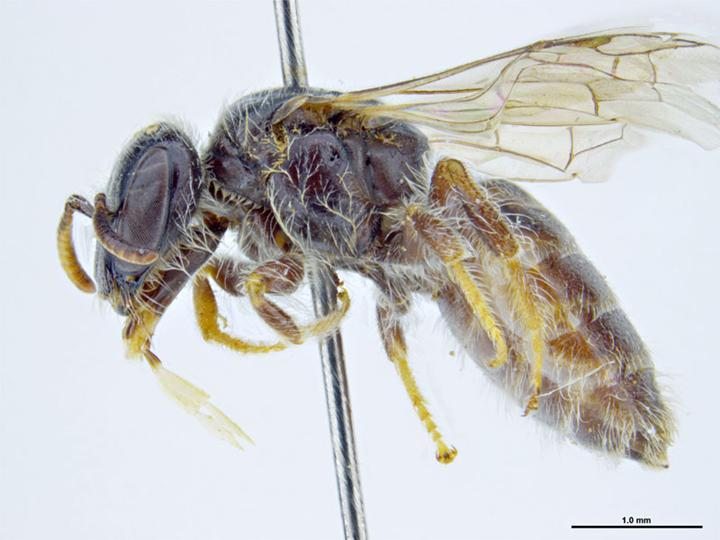
- Female

Scientific classification
- Kingdom: Animalia
- Phylum: Arthropoda
- Clade: Pancrustacea
- Class: Insecta
- Order: Hymenoptera
- Family: Colletidae
- Genus: Euhesma
- Species: E. yellowdinensis

Binomial name
- Euhesma yellowdinensis (Exley, 1998)

Synonyms
- Euryglossa (Euhesma) yellowdinensis Exley, 1998

= Euhesma yellowdinensis =

Species of bee

Euhesma yellowdinensis, or Euhesma (Euhesma) yellowdinensis, is a species of bee in the family Colletidae and the subfamily Euryglossinae. It is endemic to Australia. It was described in 1998 by Australian entomologist Elizabeth Exley.

== Etymology ==
The specific epithet yellowdinensis refers to the type locality.

== Description ==
Body length of the female is 5.0 mm, wing length 4.0 mm; that of the male is body length 4.0 mm, wing length 3 mm. Colouration is mainly black, dark brown and yellow.

== Distribution and habitat ==
The species occurs in southern inland Western Australia. The type locality is 6 km east of Yellowdine, in the Goldfields–Esperance region.

== Behaviour ==
The adults are flying mellivores. Flowering plants visited by the bees include Eremophila and Melaleuca species.
