= Euhesma micans =

Scientific classification
- Kingdom: Animalia
- Phylum: Arthropoda
- Clade: Pancrustacea
- Class: Insecta
- Order: Hymenoptera
- Family: Colletidae
- Genus: Euhesma
- Species: E. micans

Binomial name
- Euhesma micans Hogendoorn & Leijs, 2015

Species of bee

Euhesma micans, or Euhesma (Euhesma) micans, is a species of bee in the family Colletidae and the subfamily Euryglossinae. It is endemic to Australia. It was described in 2015 by entomologists Katja Hogendoorn and Remko Leijs.

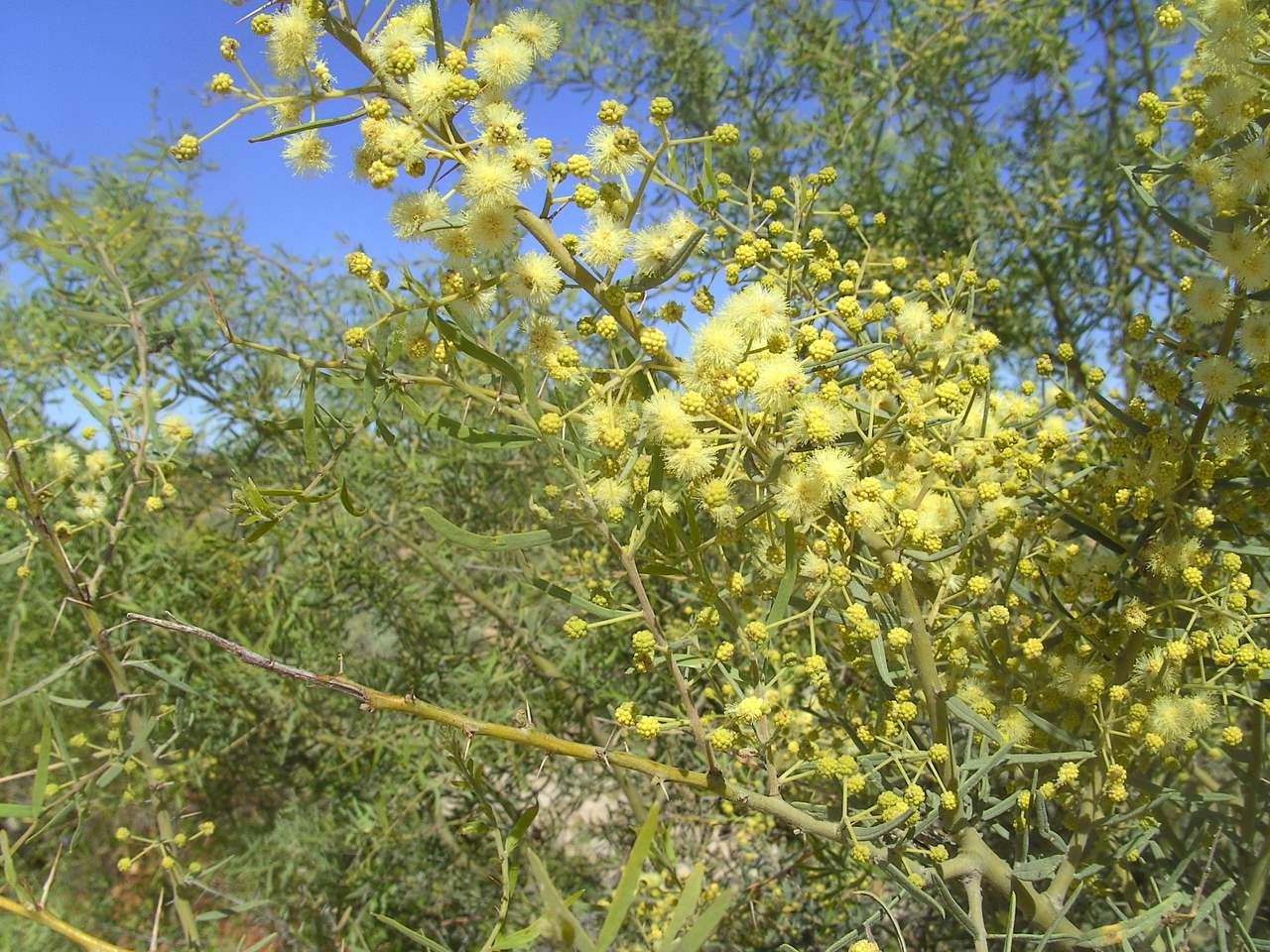
Acacia victoriae, or elegant wattle, a forage plant of the bees

== Etymology ==
The specific epithet micans refers to the shiny frons.

== Description ==
The female holotype has a body length of 4.5 mm, wing length 3.1 mm, and head width 0.9 mm. The male paratype has a body length of 3.6 mm, wing length 2.6 mm, and head width 0.8 mm. Colouration is mainly black, dark brown and yellowish.

== Distribution and habitat ==
The species occurs in South Australia. The type locality is Bon Bon Reserve.

== Behaviour ==
The adults are flying mellivores. Flowering plants visited by the bees include Acacia victoriae.
