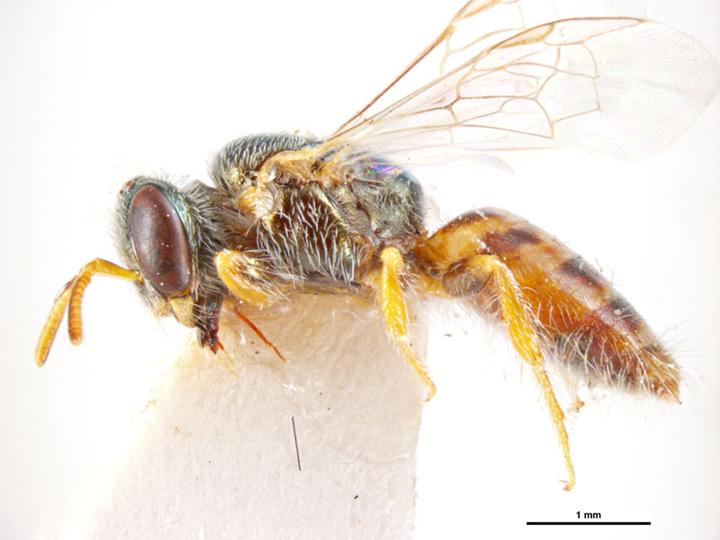
- Female

Scientific classification
- Kingdom: Animalia
- Phylum: Arthropoda
- Clade: Pancrustacea
- Class: Insecta
- Order: Hymenoptera
- Family: Colletidae
- Genus: Euhesma
- Species: E. allunga

Binomial name
- Euhesma allunga Exley, 2001

= Euhesma allunga =

Species of bee

Euhesma allunga, or Euhesma (Euhesma) allunga, is a species of bee in the family Colletidae and the subfamily Euryglossinae. It is endemic to Australia. It was described in 2001 by Australian entomologist Elizabeth Exley.

== Distribution and habitat ==
The species occurs in Western Australia. The type locality is 9 km north-north-east of Geraldton in the Mid West region.

== Behaviour ==
The adults are flying mellivores. Flowering plants reported to be visited by the bees include Banksia prionotes.

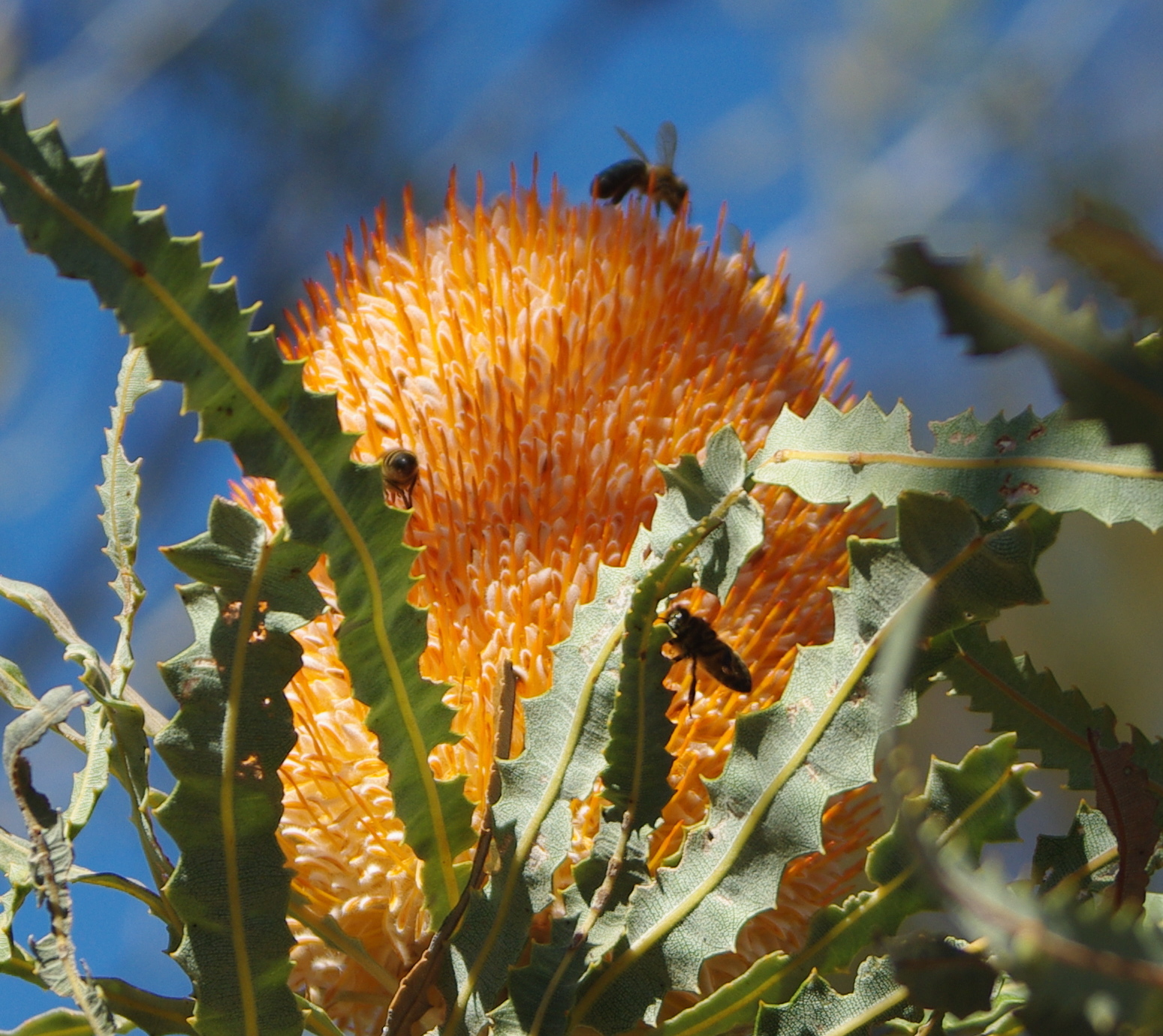
Banksia prionotes flower

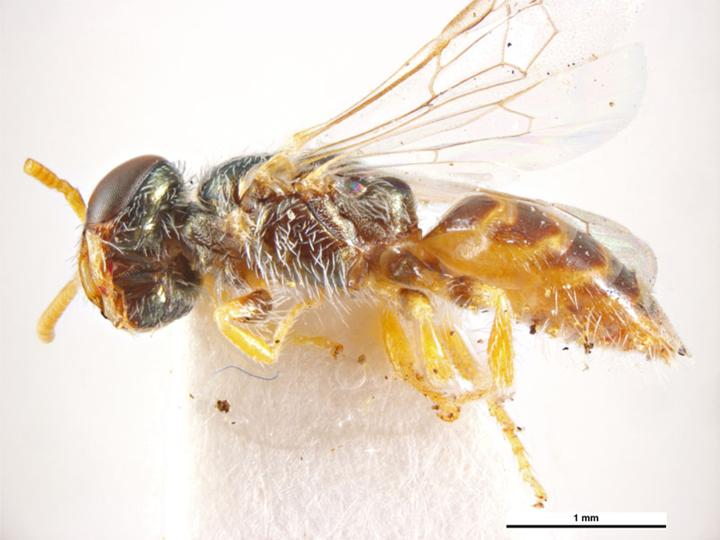
Male
