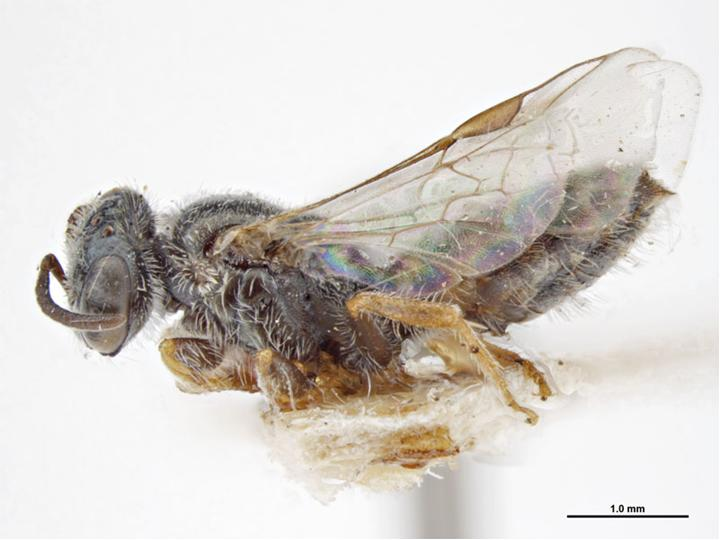
- Female

Scientific classification
- Kingdom: Animalia
- Phylum: Arthropoda
- Clade: Pancrustacea
- Class: Insecta
- Order: Hymenoptera
- Family: Colletidae
- Genus: Euhesma
- Species: E. subinconspicua

Binomial name
- Euhesma subinconspicua (Rayment, 1934)

Synonyms
- Euryglossa subinconspicua Rayment, 1934

= Euhesma subinconspicua =

Species of bee

Euhesma subinconspicua, or Euhesma (Euhesma) subinconspicua, is a species of bee in the family Colletidae and the subfamily Euryglossinae. It is endemic to Australia. It was described in 1934 by Australian entomologist Tarlton Rayment.

== Distribution and habitat ==
The species occurs in Victoria. The type locality is Kiata in the Wimmera region.

== Behaviour ==
The adults are flying mellivores. Flowering plants visited by the bees include Bursaria species.
