= Euhesma aulaca =

Scientific classification
- Kingdom: Animalia
- Phylum: Arthropoda
- Clade: Pancrustacea
- Class: Insecta
- Order: Hymenoptera
- Family: Colletidae
- Genus: Euhesma
- Species: E. aulaca

Binomial name
- Euhesma aulaca Hogendoorn & Leijs, 2015

Species of bee

Euhesma aulaca, or Euhesma (Euhesma) aulaca, is a species of bee in the family Colletidae and the subfamily Euryglossinae. It is endemic to Australia. It was described in 2015 by entomologists Katja Hogendoorn and Remko Leijs.

== Etymology ==
The specific epithet aulaca (‘furrowed’) refers to a distinctive deep median furrow in the clypeus.

== Description ==
The female holotype has a body length of 5.5 mm, wing length 3.5 mm, and head width 1.6 mm. A male paratype has a body length of 5.2 mm, wing length 3.6 mm, and head width 1.2 mm. Colouration is mainly black, brown and yellow.

== Distribution and habitat ==
The species occurs in South Australia. The type locality is Bon Bon Reserve.

== Behaviour ==
The adults are flying mellivores. Flowering plants visited by the bees include Eremophila scoparia.
