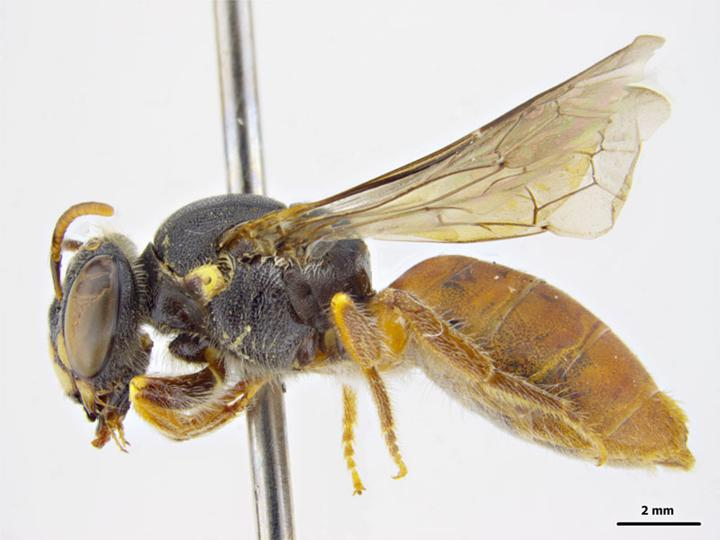
- Female

Scientific classification
- Kingdom: Animalia
- Phylum: Arthropoda
- Clade: Pancrustacea
- Class: Insecta
- Order: Hymenoptera
- Family: Colletidae
- Genus: Euhesma
- Species: E. sulcata

Binomial name
- Euhesma sulcata (Exley, 1998)

Synonyms
- Euryglossa (Euhesma) sulcata Exley, 1998

= Euhesma sulcata =

Species of bee

Euhesma sulcata, or Euhesma (Euhesma) sulcata, is a species of bee in the family Colletidae and the subfamily Euryglossinae. It is endemic to Australia. It was described in 1998 by Australian entomologist Elizabeth Exley.

== Etymology ==
The specific epithet sulcata is an anatomical Latin reference to the median furrow on the clypeus.

== Description ==
Body length of the female is 6.5 mm, wing length 4.5 mm; that of the male is body length 5.5 mm, wing length 4.2 mm. Colouration is mainly black, brown and yellow.

== Distribution and habitat ==
The species occurs in Western Australia. The type locality is 136 km north-north-east of Meekatharra, in the Mid West region.

== Behaviour ==
The adults are flying mellivores. Flowering plants visited by the bees include Eremophila species.

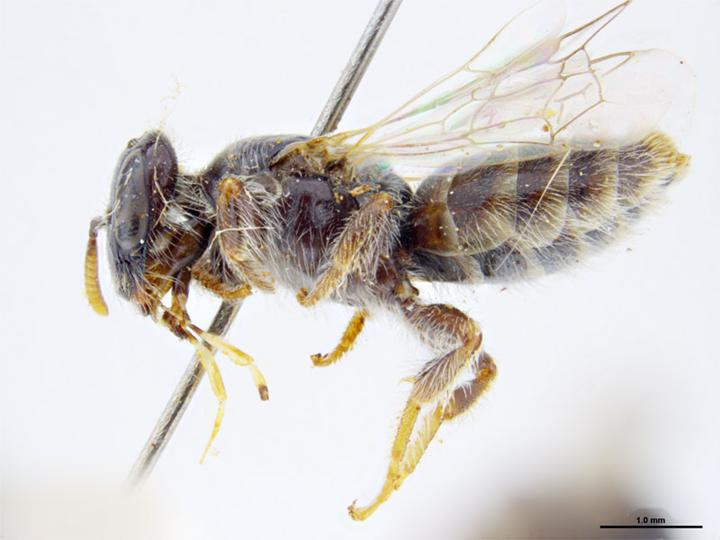
Male
