= Euhesma ricae =

Scientific classification
- Kingdom: Animalia
- Phylum: Arthropoda
- Clade: Pancrustacea
- Class: Insecta
- Order: Hymenoptera
- Family: Colletidae
- Genus: Euhesma
- Species: E. ricae

Binomial name
- Euhesma ricae (Rayment, 1948)

Synonyms
- Euryglossa ricae Rayment, 1948

Species of bee

Euhesma ricae, or Euhesma (Euhesma) ricae, is a species of bee in the family Colletidae and the subfamily Euryglossinae. It is endemic to Australia. It was described in 1948 by Australian entomologist Tarlton Rayment.

== Etymology ==
The specific epithet ricae honours the collector of the holotype specimen, writer and naturalist Rica Erickson.

== Description ==
The female body length is 9 mm; the colouring is black with yellow markings.

== Distribution and habitat ==
The species occurs in south-west Western Australia. The type locality is Bolgart in the Wheatbelt.

== Behaviour ==
The adults are flying mellivores. Flowering plants visited by the bees include Baeckea species.
