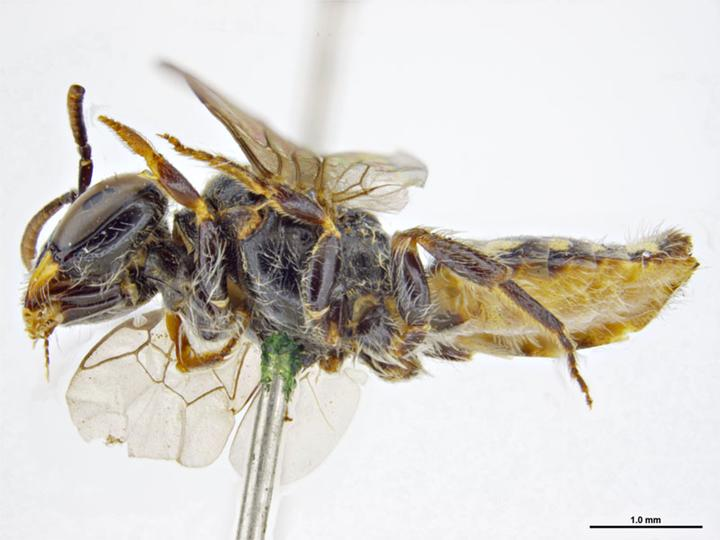
- Female

Scientific classification
- Kingdom: Animalia
- Phylum: Arthropoda
- Clade: Pancrustacea
- Class: Insecta
- Order: Hymenoptera
- Family: Colletidae
- Genus: Euhesma
- Species: E. maculifera

Binomial name
- Euhesma maculifera (Michener, 1965)

Synonyms
- Euryglossa (Euhesma) maculifera Michener, 1965; Melittosmithia maculata Rayment, 1935

= Euhesma maculifera =

Species of bee

Euhesma maculifera, or Euhesma (Euhesma) maculifera, is a species of bee in the family Colletidae and the subfamily Euryglossinae. It is endemic to Australia. It was described in 1965 by American entomologist Charles Duncan Michener.

== Distribution and habitat ==
The species occurs in south-eastern Australia. The type locality is Beaumaris, Victoria.

== Behaviour ==
The adults are flying mellivores. Flowering plants visited by the bees include Leptospermum species.
