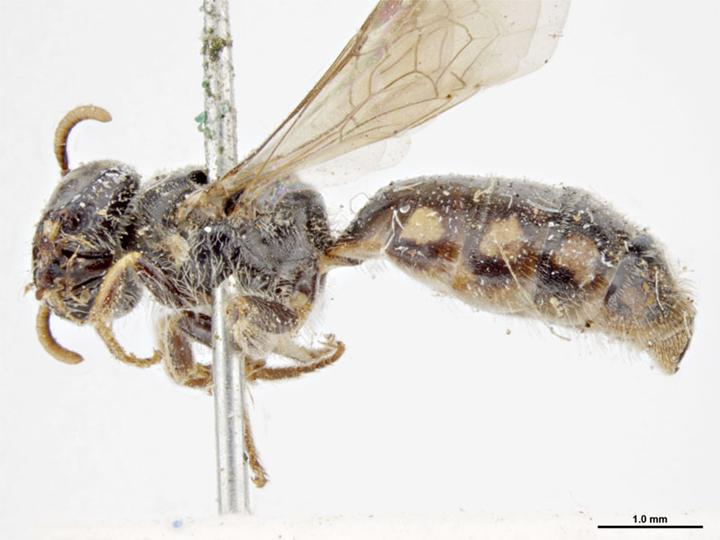
- Female

Scientific classification
- Kingdom: Animalia
- Phylum: Arthropoda
- Clade: Pancrustacea
- Class: Insecta
- Order: Hymenoptera
- Family: Colletidae
- Genus: Euhesma
- Species: E. nitidifrons

Binomial name
- Euhesma nitidifrons (Smith, 1879)

Synonyms
- Euryglossa nitidifrons Smith, 1879

= Euhesma nitidifrons =

Species of bee

Euhesma nitidifrons, or Euhesma (Euhesma) nitidifrons, is a species of bee in the family Colletidae and the subfamily Euryglossinae. It is endemic to Australia. It was described in 1879 by English entomologist Frederick Smith.

== Distribution and habitat ==
The type locality is noted as "Australia" only, with no further details.

== Behaviour ==
The adults are solitary flying mellivores which nest gregariously in soil. Flowering plants visited by the bees include Leptospermum species.
