= Euhesma hemixantha =

Scientific classification
- Kingdom: Animalia
- Phylum: Arthropoda
- Clade: Pancrustacea
- Class: Insecta
- Order: Hymenoptera
- Family: Colletidae
- Genus: Euhesma
- Species: E. hemixantha

Binomial name
- Euhesma hemixantha (Cockerell, 1914)

Synonyms
- Euryglossa hemixantha Cockerell, 1914

Species of bee

Euhesma hemixantha, or Euhesma (Euhesma) hemixantha, is a species of bee in the family Colletidae and the subfamily Euryglossinae. It is endemic to Australia. It was described in 1914 by British-American entomologist Theodore Dru Alison Cockerell.

== Description ==
Male body length is about 4.5 mm. Colouring is mainly black, yellow and dark reddish-brown.

== Distribution and habitat ==
The species occurs in eastern Australia. The type locality is Brisbane.

== Behaviour ==
The adults are flying mellivores.
