= Euhesma albamala =

Scientific classification
- Kingdom: Animalia
- Phylum: Arthropoda
- Clade: Pancrustacea
- Class: Insecta
- Order: Hymenoptera
- Family: Colletidae
- Genus: Euhesma
- Species: E. albamala

Binomial name
- Euhesma albamala Hogendoorn & Leijs, 2015

Species of bee

Euhesma albamala, or Euhesma (Euhesma) albamala, is a species of bee in the family Colletidae and the subfamily Euryglossinae. It is endemic to Australia. It was described in 2015 by entomologists Katja Hogendoorn and Remko Leijs.

== Etymology ==
The specific epithet albamala refers to the bees’ white mandibles.

== Description ==
The female holotype has a body length of 5.0 mm, wing length 3.2 mm, and head width 1.5 mm. A male paratype has a body length of 3.8 mm, wing length 3 mm, and head width 1.2 mm. Colouration is mainly brown and yellow, with a metallic sheen. The species has distinctive white mandibles with dark tips.

== Distribution and habitat ==
The species occurs in north-west Western Australia. The type locality is the Cane River Conservation Park in the Pilbara.

== Behaviour ==
The adults are flying mellivores. Flowering plants visited by the bees include Grevillea species.
