= Euhesma atra =

Scientific classification
- Kingdom: Animalia
- Phylum: Arthropoda
- Clade: Pancrustacea
- Class: Insecta
- Order: Hymenoptera
- Family: Colletidae
- Genus: Euhesma
- Species: E. atra

Binomial name
- Euhesma atra (Exley, 1998)

Synonyms
- Euryglossa (Euhesma) atra Exley, 1998

Species of bee

Euhesma atra, or Euhesma (Euhesma) atra, is a species of bee in the family Colletidae and the subfamily Euryglossinae. It is endemic to Australia. It was described in 1998 by Australian entomologist Elizabeth Exley.

== Etymology ==
The specific epithet atra refers to the dull black colour of head and thorax.

== Description ==
Body length of the female holotype is 5.0 mm, wing length 4.0 mm. Colouration is black, dark brown and yellowish.

== Distribution and habitat ==
The species occurs in southern inland Western Australia. The type locality is Boorabbin Rock.

== Behaviour ==
The adults are flying mellivores. Flowering plants visited by the bees include Eremophila species.
