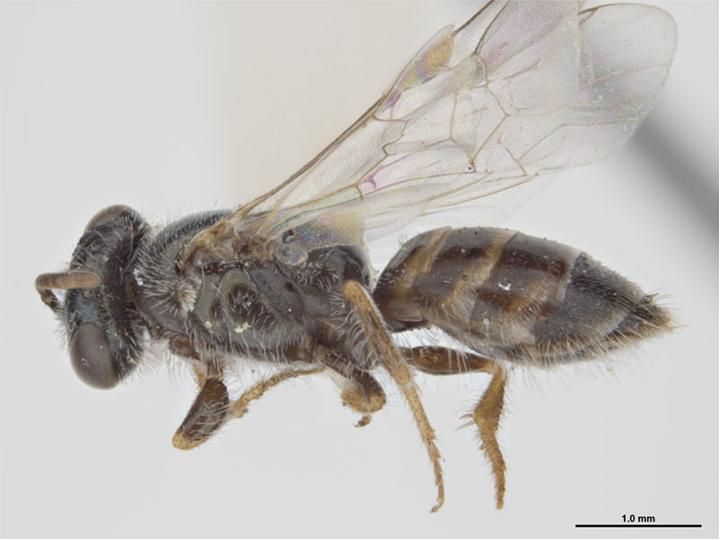
- Female

Scientific classification
- Kingdom: Animalia
- Phylum: Arthropoda
- Clade: Pancrustacea
- Class: Insecta
- Order: Hymenoptera
- Family: Colletidae
- Genus: Euhesma
- Species: E. banksia

Binomial name
- Euhesma banksia Exley, 2001

= Euhesma banksia =

Species of bee

Euhesma banksia, or Euhesma (Euhesma) banksia, is a species of bee in the family Colletidae and the subfamily Euryglossinae. It is endemic to Australia. It was described in 2001 by Australian entomologist Elizabeth Exley.

== Distribution and habitat ==
The species occurs widely in Australia. The type locality is East Mount Barren, in the Fitzgerald River National Park of south-west Western Australia.

== Behaviour ==
The adults are flying mellivores. Flowering plants visited by the bees include Banksia and Melaleuca species.
