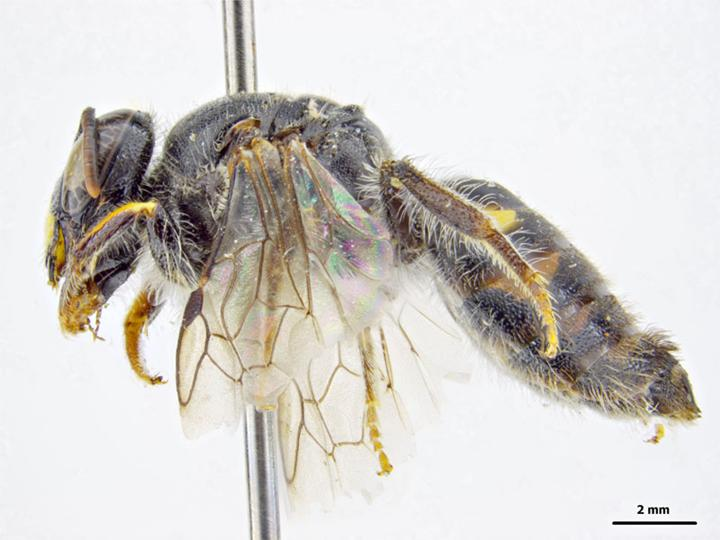
- Female

Scientific classification
- Kingdom: Animalia
- Phylum: Arthropoda
- Clade: Pancrustacea
- Class: Insecta
- Order: Hymenoptera
- Family: Colletidae
- Genus: Euhesma
- Species: E. undeneya

Binomial name
- Euhesma undeneya Exley, 2002

= Euhesma undeneya =

Species of bee

Euhesma undeneya, or Euhesma (Euhesma) undeneya, is a species of bee in the family Colletidae and the subfamily Euryglossinae. It is endemic to Australia. It was described in 2002 by Australian entomologist Elizabeth Exley.

== Etymology ==
The specific epithet undeneya is an Aboriginal word for 'wasp', referring to a perceived likeness.

== Description ==
The body length of the female is 10 mm, wing length 6 mm. Colouration is mainly black and yellow.

== Distribution and habitat ==
The species occurs in Western Australia. The type locality is Eneabba, in the Wheatbelt region.

== Behaviour ==
The adults are flying mellivores. Flowering plants visited by the bees include Verticordia species.
