= Euhesma tasmanica =

Scientific classification
- Kingdom: Animalia
- Phylum: Arthropoda
- Clade: Pancrustacea
- Class: Insecta
- Order: Hymenoptera
- Family: Colletidae
- Genus: Euhesma
- Species: E. tasmanica

Binomial name
- Euhesma tasmanica (Cockerell, 1918)

Synonyms
- Euryglossa tasmanica Cockerell, 1918

Species of bee

Euhesma tasmanica, or Euhesma (Euhesma) tasmanica, is a species of bee in the family Colletidae and the subfamily Euryglossinae. It is endemic to Australia. It was described in 1918 by British-American entomologist Theodore Dru Alison Cockerell.

== Description ==
Female body length is about 6.5 mm. Colouring is mainly black, yellow and dark reddish.

== Distribution and habitat ==
The species occurs in Tasmania. The type locality is Launceston.

== Behaviour ==
The adults are flying mellivores.
