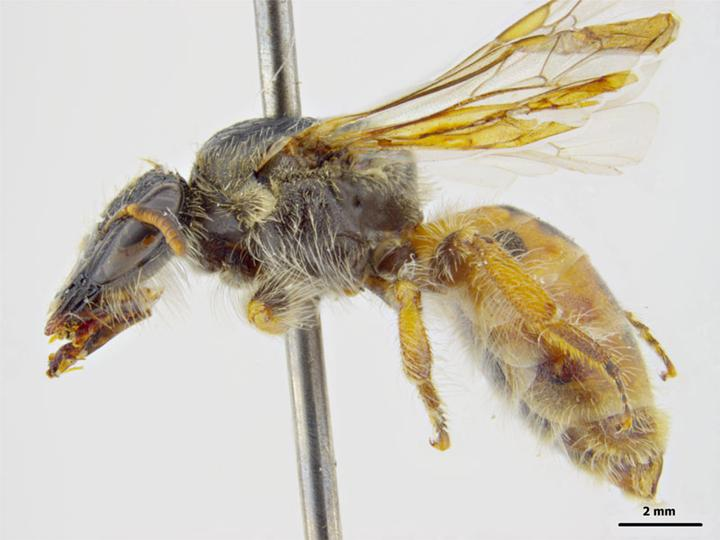
- Female

Scientific classification
- Kingdom: Animalia
- Phylum: Arthropoda
- Clade: Pancrustacea
- Class: Insecta
- Order: Hymenoptera
- Family: Colletidae
- Genus: Euhesma
- Species: E. platyrhina

Binomial name
- Euhesma platyrhina (Cockerell, 1915)

Synonyms
- Euryglossa platyrhina Cockerell, 1915

= Euhesma platyrhina =

Species of bee

Euhesma platyrhina, or Euhesma (Euhesma) platyrhina, is a species of bee in the family Colletidae and the subfamily Euryglossinae. It is endemic to Australia. It was described in 1915 by British-American entomologist Theodore Dru Alison Cockerell.

== Description ==
Female body length is about 6.5 mm. Colouring is mainly black, yellow and reddish-brown.

== Distribution and habitat ==
The species occurs in south-west Western Australia. The type locality is Yallingup.

== Behaviour ==
The adults are flying mellivores.

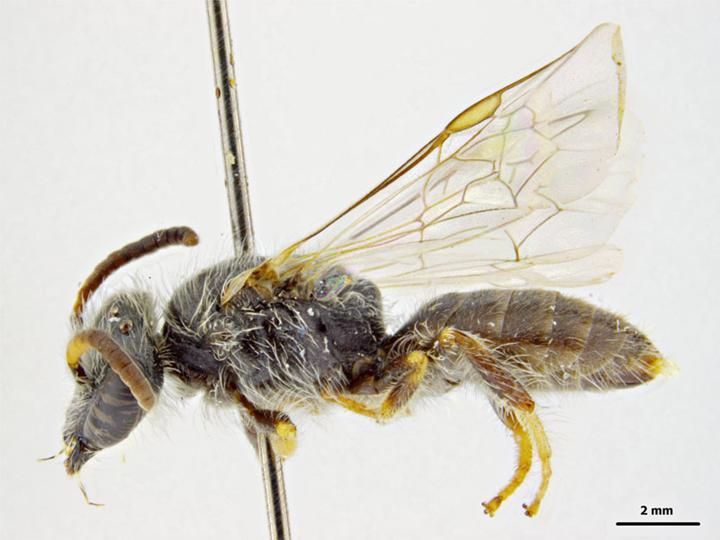
Male
