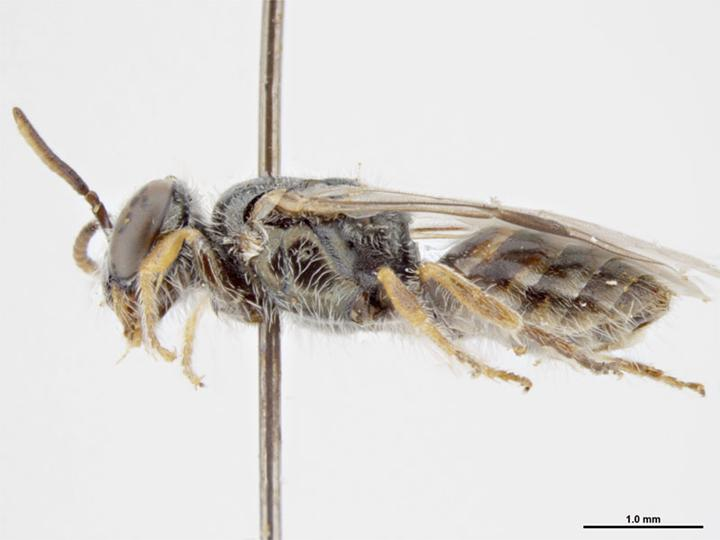
- Female

Scientific classification
- Kingdom: Animalia
- Phylum: Arthropoda
- Clade: Pancrustacea
- Class: Insecta
- Order: Hymenoptera
- Family: Colletidae
- Genus: Euhesma
- Species: E. dongara

Binomial name
- Euhesma dongara Exley, 2001

= Euhesma dongara =

Species of bee

Euhesma dongara, or Euhesma (Euhesma) dongara, is a species of bee in the family Colletidae and the subfamily Euryglossinae. It is endemic to Australia. It was described in 2001 by Australian entomologist Elizabeth Exley.

== Distribution and habitat ==
The species occurs in Western Australia. The type locality is 23 km east by north of Dongara, in the Mid West region.

== Behaviour ==
The adults are flying mellivores. Flowering plants visited by the bees include Calothamnus species.
