= Euhesma collaris =

Scientific classification
- Kingdom: Animalia
- Phylum: Arthropoda
- Clade: Pancrustacea
- Class: Insecta
- Order: Hymenoptera
- Family: Colletidae
- Genus: Euhesma
- Species: E. collaris

Binomial name
- Euhesma collaris Exley, 2004

Species of bee

Euhesma collaris, or Euhesma (Euhesma) collaris, is a species of bee in the family Colletidae and the subfamily Euryglossinae. It is endemic to Australia. It was described in 2004 by Australian entomologist Elizabeth Exley.

== Distribution and habitat ==
The species occurs in central Australia. The type locality is 48 km north of Windorah in Central West Queensland.

== Behaviour ==
The adults are flying mellivores.
