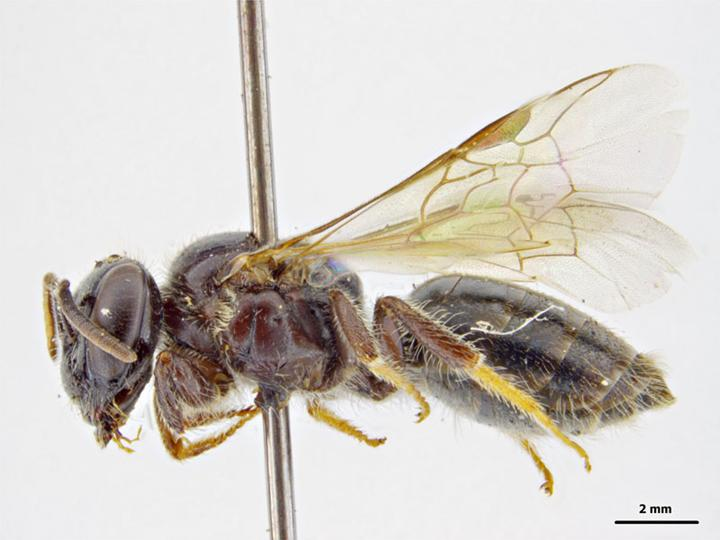
- Female

Scientific classification
- Kingdom: Animalia
- Phylum: Arthropoda
- Clade: Pancrustacea
- Class: Insecta
- Order: Hymenoptera
- Family: Colletidae
- Genus: Euhesma
- Species: E. neglectula

Binomial name
- Euhesma neglectula (Cockerell, 1905)

Synonyms
- Euryglossa neglectula Cockerell, 1905; Euryglossa neglectula mica Cockerell, 1918

= Euhesma neglectula =

Species of bee

Euhesma neglectula, or Euhesma (Euhesma) neglectula, is a species of bee in the family Colletidae and the subfamily Euryglossinae. It is endemic to Australia. It was described in 1905 by British-American entomologist Theodore Dru Alison Cockerell.

== Distribution and habitat ==
The species occurs in eastern Australia. A type locality is Brisbane.

== Behaviour ==
The adults are flying mellivores. Flowering plants visited by the bees include Angophora, Eucalyptus and Melaleuca species.

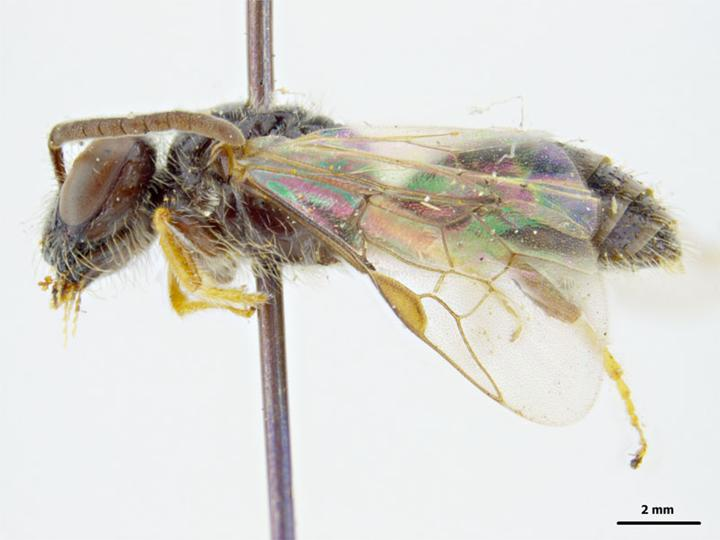
Male
