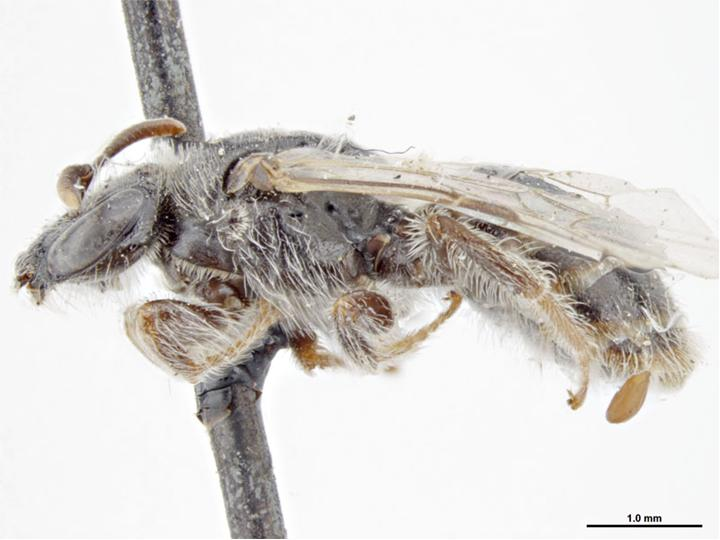
- Female

Scientific classification
- Kingdom: Animalia
- Phylum: Arthropoda
- Clade: Pancrustacea
- Class: Insecta
- Order: Hymenoptera
- Family: Colletidae
- Genus: Euhesma
- Species: E. perkinsi

Binomial name
- Euhesma perkinsi (Michener, 1965)

Synonyms
- Euryglossa (Euhesma) perkinsi Michener, 1965

= Euhesma perkinsi =

Species of bee

Euhesma perkinsi, or Euhesma (Euhesma) perkinsi, is a species of bee in the family Colletidae and the subfamily Euryglossinae. It is endemic to Australia. It was described in 1965 by American entomologist Charles Duncan Michener.

== Distribution and habitat ==
The species occurs in Queensland. The type locality is Dalby in the Western Downs Region.

== Behaviour ==
The adults are flying mellivores. Flowering plants visited by the bees include Wahlenbergia species.
