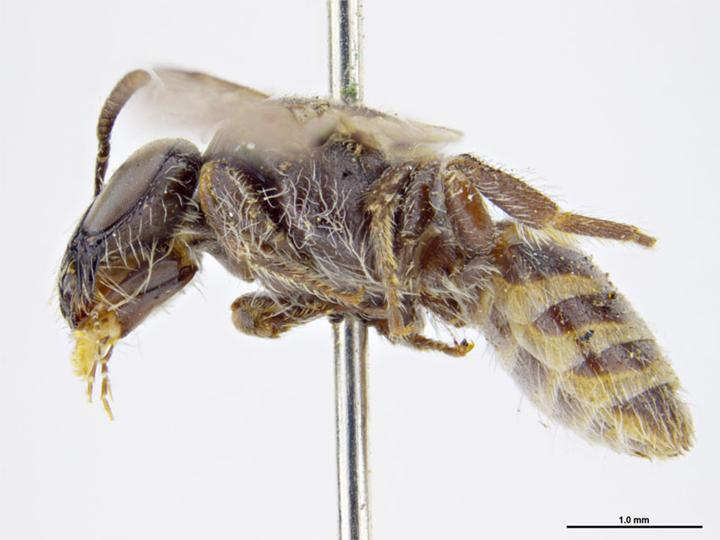
- Female

Scientific classification
- Kingdom: Animalia
- Phylum: Arthropoda
- Clade: Pancrustacea
- Class: Insecta
- Order: Hymenoptera
- Family: Colletidae
- Genus: Euhesma
- Species: E. palpalis

Binomial name
- Euhesma palpalis (Michener, 1965)

Synonyms
- Euryglossa (Euhesma) palpalis Michener, 1965

= Euhesma palpalis =

Species of bee

Euhesma palpalis, or Euhesma (Euhesma) palpalis, is a species of bee in the family Colletidae and the subfamily Euryglossinae. It is endemic to Australia. It was described in 1965 by American entomologist Charles Duncan Michener.

== Distribution and habitat ==
The species occurs in Victoria. The type locality is Mount Hotham at an elevation of 5,000 ft (1,524 m). It has also been recorded from Mount Buffalo.

== Behaviour ==
The adults are flying mellivores.
