= Euhesma grisea =

Scientific classification
- Kingdom: Animalia
- Phylum: Arthropoda
- Clade: Pancrustacea
- Class: Insecta
- Order: Hymenoptera
- Family: Colletidae
- Genus: Euhesma
- Species: E. grisea

Binomial name
- Euhesma grisea (Alfken, 1907)

Synonyms
- Allodape grisea Alfken, 1907

Species of bee

Euhesma grisea, or Euhesma (Euhesma) grisea, is a species of bee in the family Colletidae and the subfamily Euryglossinae. It is endemic to Australia. It was described in 1907 by German entomologist Johann Dietrich Alfken.

== Distribution and habitat ==
The species occurs in Western Australia. The type locality is Denham in the Gascoyne region.

== Behaviour ==
The adults are flying mellivores.
