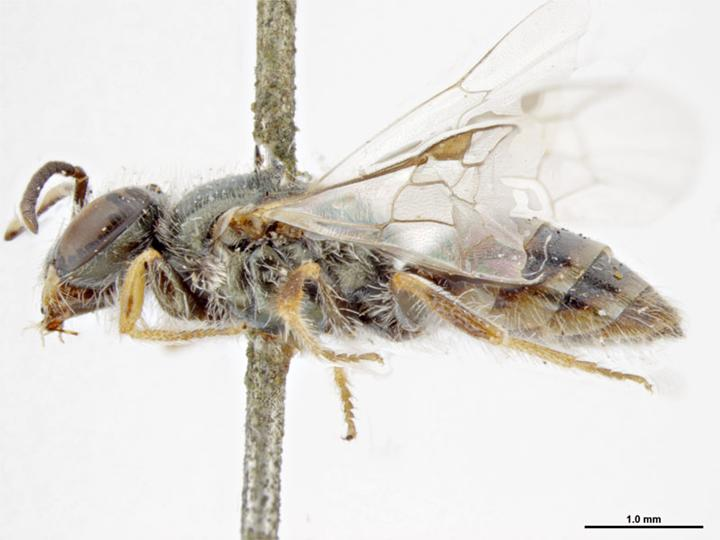
- Female

Scientific classification
- Kingdom: Animalia
- Phylum: Arthropoda
- Clade: Pancrustacea
- Class: Insecta
- Order: Hymenoptera
- Family: Colletidae
- Genus: Euhesma
- Species: E. latissima

Binomial name
- Euhesma latissima (Cockerell, 1914)

Synonyms
- Euryglossa latissima Cockerell, 1914; Euryglossa halictoides Rayment, 1939

= Euhesma latissima =

Species of bee

Euhesma latissima, or Euhesma (Euhesma) latissima, is a species of bee in the family Colletidae and the subfamily Euryglossinae. It is endemic to Australia. It was described in 1914 by British-American entomologist Theodore Dru Alison Cockerell.

== Description ==
Male body length is about 4.5 mm. Colouring is mainly dark olive-green and dark reddish-brown.

== Distribution and habitat ==
The species occurs in south-eastern Australia. The type locality is Eaglehawk Neck, Tasmania. It has also been recorded from Frankston, Victoria.

== Behaviour ==
The adults are flying mellivores. Flowering plants visited by the bees include Melaleuca lanceolata, Melaleuca linariifolia and Eucalyptus species.
