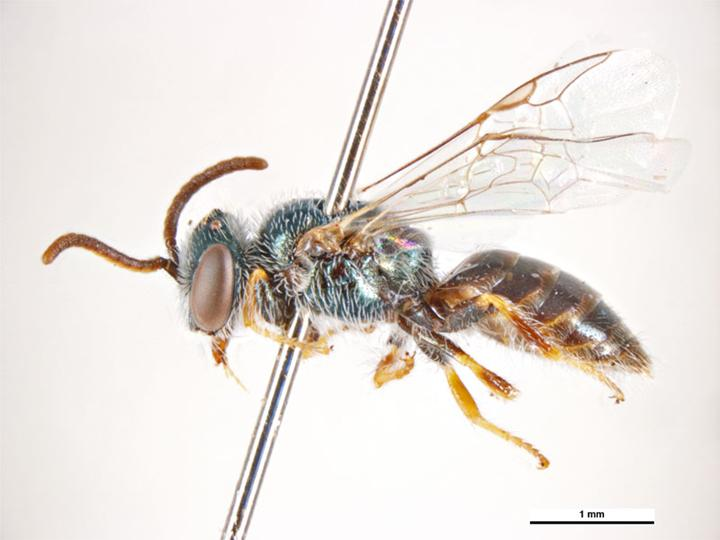
- Female

Scientific classification
- Kingdom: Animalia
- Phylum: Arthropoda
- Clade: Pancrustacea
- Class: Insecta
- Order: Hymenoptera
- Family: Colletidae
- Genus: Euhesma
- Species: E. spinola

Binomial name
- Euhesma spinola Exley, 2001

= Euhesma spinola =

Species of bee

Euhesma spinola, or Euhesma (Euhesma) spinola, is a species of bee in the family Colletidae and the subfamily Euryglossinae. It is endemic to Australia. It was described in 2001 by Australian entomologist Elizabeth Exley.

== Distribution and habitat ==
The species occurs in Western Australia. The type locality is Pinjarrega Lake Nature Reserve, 24 km south-west of Coorow, in the Mid West region.

== Behaviour ==
The adults are flying mellivores.
