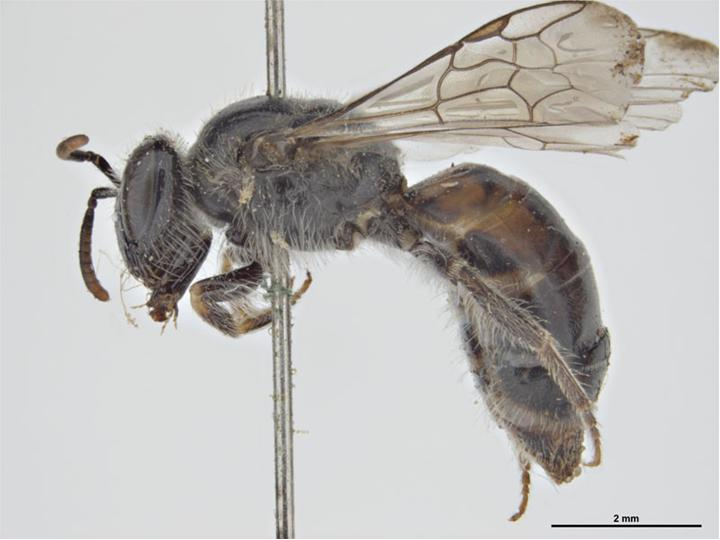
- Female

Scientific classification
- Kingdom: Animalia
- Phylum: Arthropoda
- Clade: Pancrustacea
- Class: Insecta
- Order: Hymenoptera
- Family: Colletidae
- Genus: Euhesma
- Species: E. maura

Binomial name
- Euhesma maura (Cockerell, 1927)

Synonyms
- Euryglossa nubifera maura Cockerell, 1927

= Euhesma maura =

Species of bee

Euhesma maura, or Euhesma (Euhesma) maura, is a species of bee in the family Colletidae and the subfamily Euryglossinae. It is endemic to Australia. It was described in 1927 by British-American entomologist Theodore Dru Alison Cockerell.

== Distribution and habitat ==
The species occurs in New South Wales. The type locality is Barellan in the Riverina region.

== Behaviour ==
The adults are flying mellivores. Flowering plants visited by the bees include Leptospermum species.

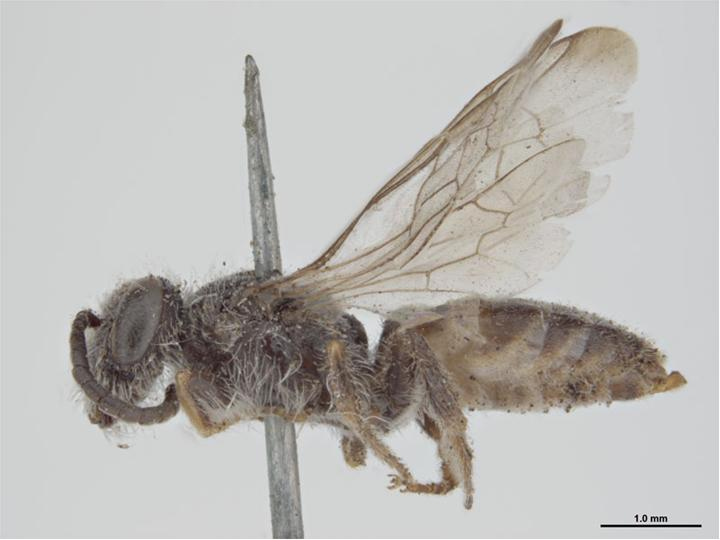
Male
