= Euhesma rainbowi =

Scientific classification
- Kingdom: Animalia
- Phylum: Arthropoda
- Clade: Pancrustacea
- Class: Insecta
- Order: Hymenoptera
- Family: Colletidae
- Genus: Euhesma
- Species: E. rainbowi

Binomial name
- Euhesma rainbowi (Cockerell, 1929)

Synonyms
- Euryglossa rainbowi Cockerell, 1929

Species of bee

Euhesma rainbowi, or Euhesma (Euhesma) rainbowi, is a species of bee in the family Colletidae and the subfamily Euryglossinae. It is endemic to Australia. It was described in 1929 by British-American entomologist Theodore Dru Alison Cockerell.

== Description ==
Body length of females is about 8.0–8.3 mm. Colouring is mainly black and dark reddish.

== Distribution and habitat ==
The species occurs in South Australia. The type locality is Blackwood, in the Adelaide Hills.

== Behaviour ==
The adults are flying mellivores.
