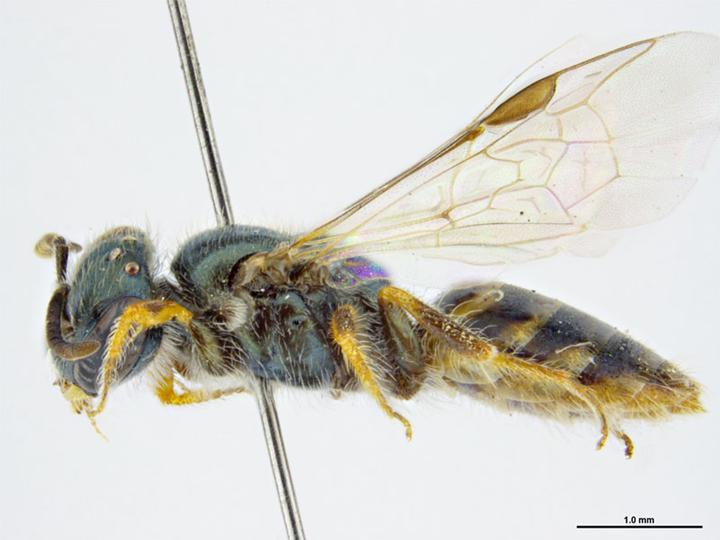
- Female

Scientific classification
- Kingdom: Animalia
- Phylum: Arthropoda
- Clade: Pancrustacea
- Class: Insecta
- Order: Hymenoptera
- Family: Colletidae
- Genus: Euhesma
- Species: E. halictina

Binomial name
- Euhesma halictina (Cockerell, 1920)

Synonyms
- Euryglossa halictina Cockerell, 1920

= Euhesma halictina =

Species of bee

Euhesma halictina, or Euhesma (Euhesma) halictina, is a species of bee in the family Colletidae and the subfamily Euryglossinae. It is endemic to Australia. It was described in 1920 by British-American entomologist Theodore Dru Alison Cockerell.

== Description ==
Female body length is about 8 mm. Colouring is mainly black.

== Distribution and habitat ==
The species occurs in Tasmania. The type locality is Bridport.

== Behaviour ==
The adults are flying mellivores.

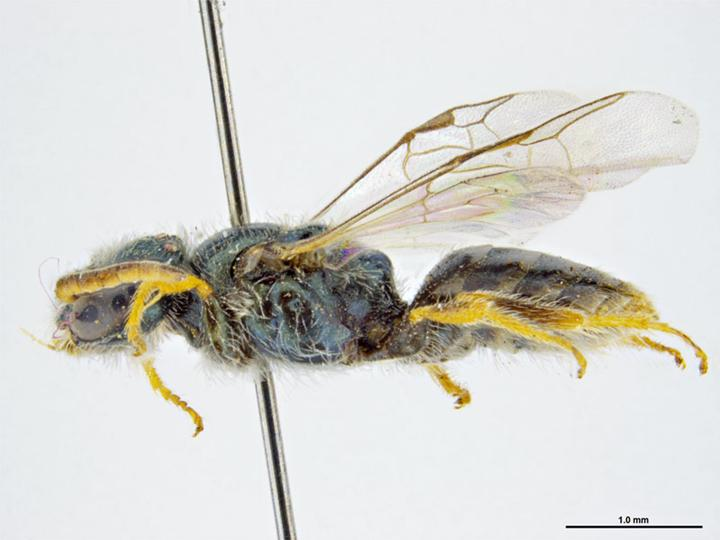
Male
