= Euhesma flavocuneata =

Scientific classification
- Kingdom: Animalia
- Phylum: Arthropoda
- Clade: Pancrustacea
- Class: Insecta
- Order: Hymenoptera
- Family: Colletidae
- Genus: Euhesma
- Species: E. flavocuneata

Binomial name
- Euhesma flavocuneata (Cockerell, 1915)

Synonyms
- Euryglossa flavocuneata Cockerell, 1915

Species of bee

Euhesma flavocuneata, or Euhesma (Euhesma) flavocuneata, is a species of bee in the family Colletidae and the subfamily Euryglossinae. It is endemic to Australia. It was described in 1915 by British-American entomologist Theodore Dru Alison Cockerell.

== Description ==
Female body length is about 8 mm. Colouring is mainly black, yellow and reddish-brown.

== Distribution and habitat ==
The species occurs in south-west Western Australia. The type locality is Yallingup.

== Behaviour ==
The adults are flying mellivores.
