= Euhesma newmanensis =

Scientific classification
- Kingdom: Animalia
- Phylum: Arthropoda
- Clade: Pancrustacea
- Class: Insecta
- Order: Hymenoptera
- Family: Colletidae
- Genus: Euhesma
- Species: E. newmanensis

Binomial name
- Euhesma newmanensis (Exley, 1998)

Synonyms
- Euryglossa (Euhesma) newmanensis Exley, 1998

Species of bee

Euhesma newmanensis, or Euhesma (Euhesma) newmanensis, is a species of bee in the family Colletidae and the subfamily Euryglossinae. It is endemic to Australia. It was described in 1998 by Australian entomologist Elizabeth Exley.

== Etymology ==
The specific epithet newmanensis refers to the type locality.

== Description ==
Body length of the female is 7.0 mm, wing length 5.0 mm. Colouration is mainly black.

== Distribution and habitat ==
The species occurs in inland Western Australia. The type locality is 22 km north-east of Newman, in the Pilbara region.

== Behaviour ==
The adults are flying mellivores. Flowering plants visited by the bees include Eremophila species.
