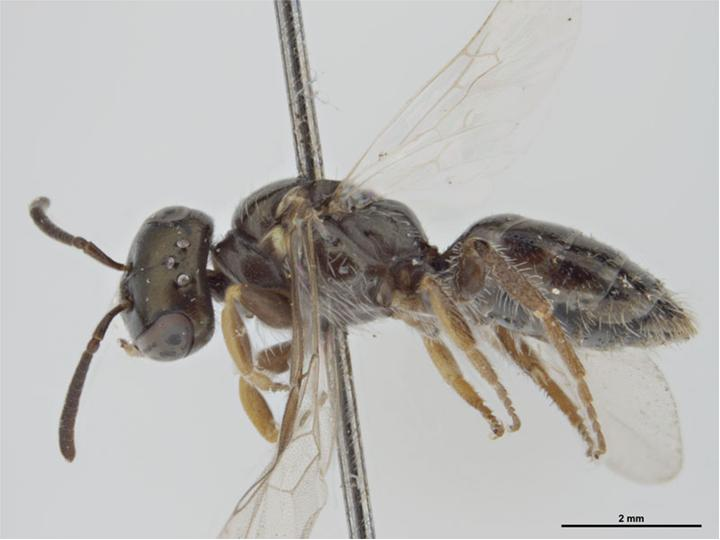
- Female

Scientific classification
- Kingdom: Animalia
- Phylum: Arthropoda
- Clade: Pancrustacea
- Class: Insecta
- Order: Hymenoptera
- Family: Colletidae
- Genus: Euhesma
- Species: E. hemichlora

Binomial name
- Euhesma hemichlora (Cockerell, 1914)

Synonyms
- Euryglossa hemichlora Cockerell, 1914

= Euhesma hemichlora =

Species of bee

Euhesma hemichlora, or Euhesma (Euhesma) hemichlora, is a species of bee in the family Colletidae and the subfamily Euryglossinae. It is endemic to Australia. It was described in 1914 by British-American entomologist Theodore Dru Alison Cockerell.

== Description ==
Male body length is about 4 mm; female body length "a little larger". Colouring is mainly dark olive-green, yellow and reddish-brown.

== Distribution and habitat ==
The species occurs in south-west Western Australia. The type locality is Yallingup.

== Behaviour ==
The adults are flying mellivores.

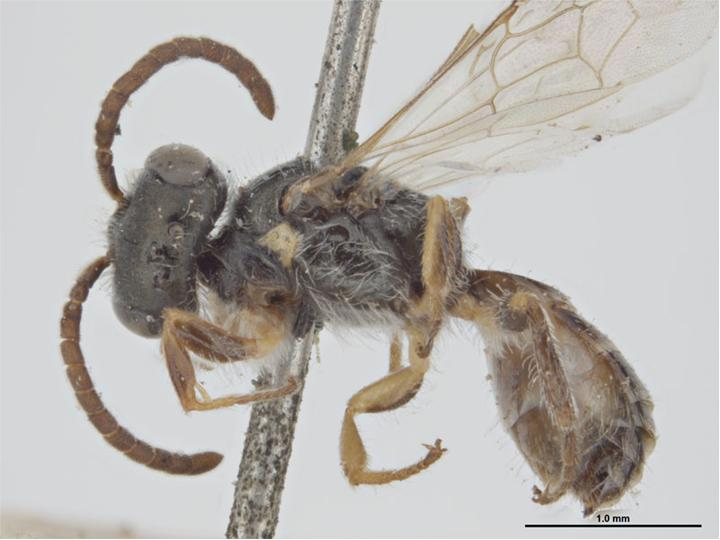
Male
