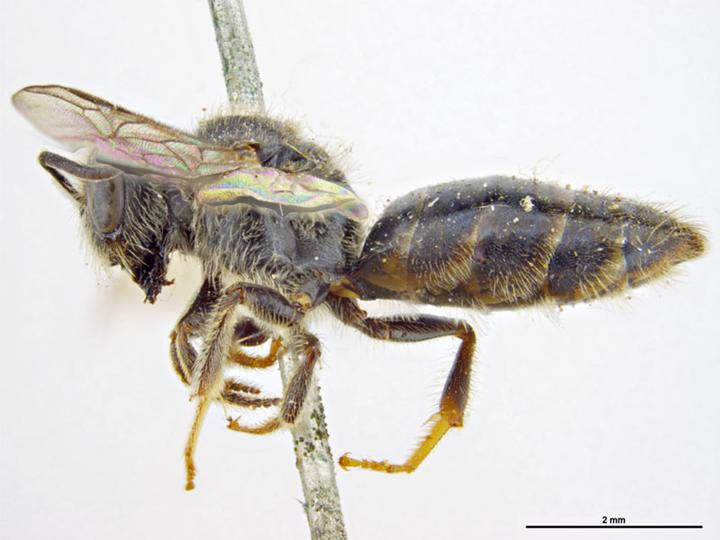
- Female

Scientific classification
- Kingdom: Animalia
- Phylum: Arthropoda
- Clade: Pancrustacea
- Class: Insecta
- Order: Hymenoptera
- Family: Colletidae
- Genus: Euhesma
- Species: E. fasciatella

Binomial name
- Euhesma fasciatella (Cockerell, 1907)

Synonyms
- Euryglossa fasciatella Cockerell, 1907; Stilpnosoma nigrum Friese, 1924

= Euhesma fasciatella =

Species of bee

Euhesma fasciatella, or Euhesma (Euhesma) fasciatella, is a species of bee in the family Colletidae and the subfamily Euryglossinae. It is endemic to Australia. It was described in 1907 by British-American entomologist Theodore Dru Alison Cockerell.

== Distribution and habitat ==
The species occurs in south-eastern Australia. The type locality is Adelaide. It has also been recorded from Tasmania and Victoria.

== Behaviour ==
The adults are solitary flying mellivores with sedentary larvae. Flowering plants visited by the bees include Leptospermum species.
