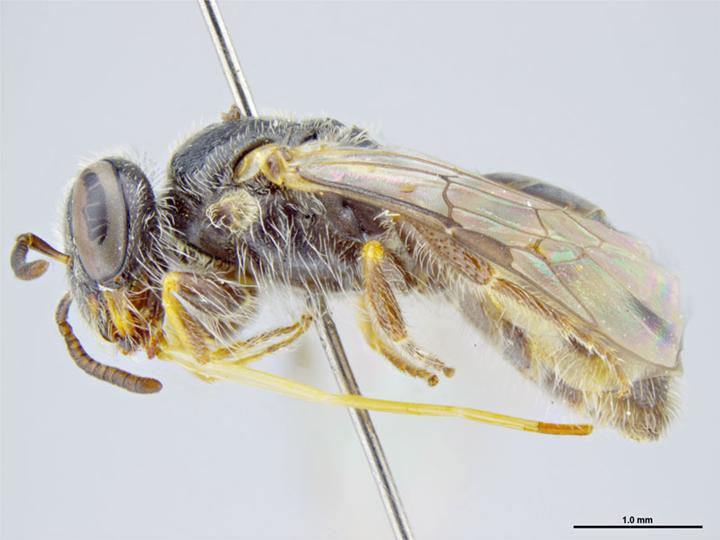
- Female

Scientific classification
- Kingdom: Animalia
- Phylum: Arthropoda
- Clade: Pancrustacea
- Class: Insecta
- Order: Hymenoptera
- Family: Colletidae
- Genus: Euhesma
- Species: E. tubulifera

Binomial name
- Euhesma tubulifera (Houston, 1983)

Synonyms
- Euryglossa (Euhesma) tubulifera Houston, 1983

= Euhesma tubulifera =

Species of bee

Euhesma tubulifera, or Euhesma (Euhesma) tubulifera, is a species of bee in the family Colletidae and the subfamily Euryglossinae. It is endemic to Australia. It was described in 1983 by Australian entomologist Terry Houston.

== Description ==
Body length of females is 5.2–6.4 mm, that of males 3.7–5.2 mm. Colouration is mainly black, brown and yellow. The species is distinguished by its "enormously elongated maxillary palpi (70-80% as long as head and body)".

== Distribution and habitat ==
The species occurs in south-west Western Australia. The type locality is Kenwick. It has also been recorded from Tutanning Reserve, near Pingelly in the Wheatbelt region.

== Behaviour ==
The adults are flying mellivores. Flowering plants visited by the bees include Calothamnus species.

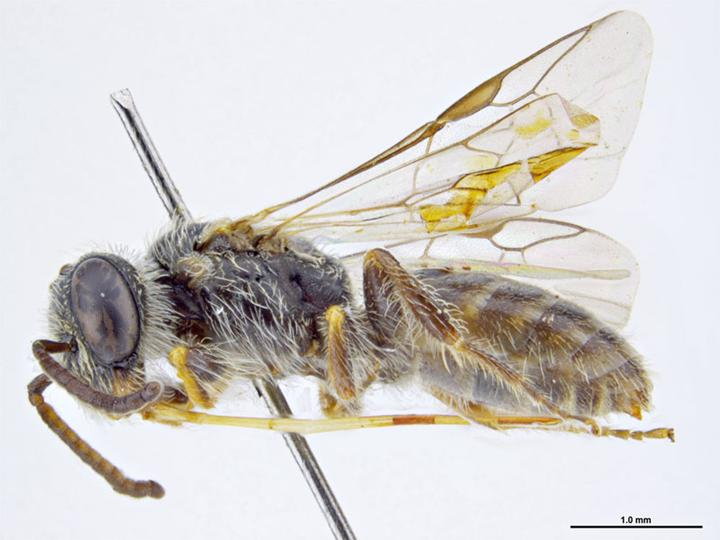
Male
