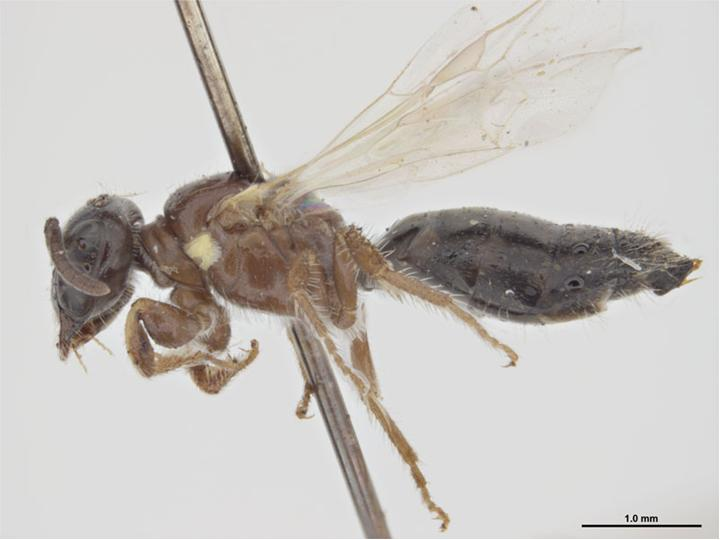
- Female

Scientific classification
- Kingdom: Animalia
- Phylum: Arthropoda
- Clade: Pancrustacea
- Class: Insecta
- Order: Hymenoptera
- Family: Colletidae
- Genus: Euhesma
- Species: E. anthracocephala

Binomial name
- Euhesma anthracocephala (Cockerell, 1914)

Synonyms
- Euryglossa anthracocephala Cockerell, 1914

= Euhesma anthracocephala =

Species of bee

Euhesma anthracocephala, or Euhesma (Euhesma) anthracocephala, is a species of bee in the family Colletidae and the subfamily Euryglossinae. It is endemic to Australia. It was described in 1914 by British-American entomologist Theodore Dru Alison Cockerell.

== Description ==
Female body length is 5.75 mm. Colouring is mainly black and yellow with dull reddish markings.

== Distribution and habitat ==
The species occurs in eastern Australia. The type locality is Brisbane.

== Behaviour ==
The adults are flying mellivores. Flowering plants visited by the bees include Eugenia species.

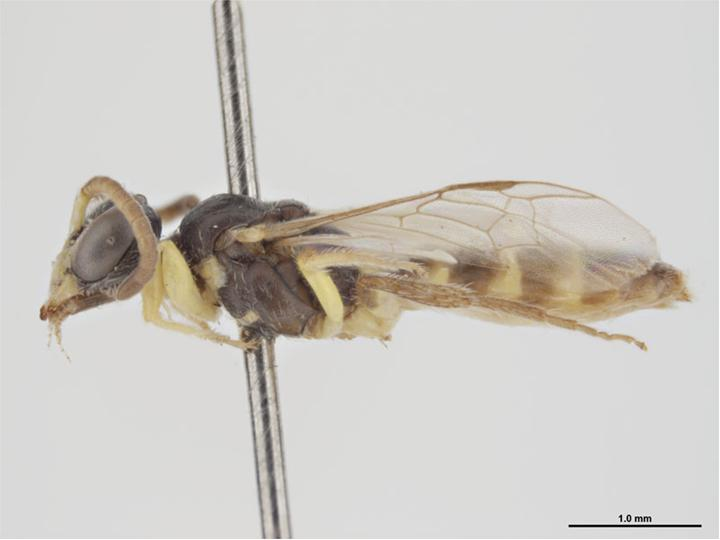
Male
