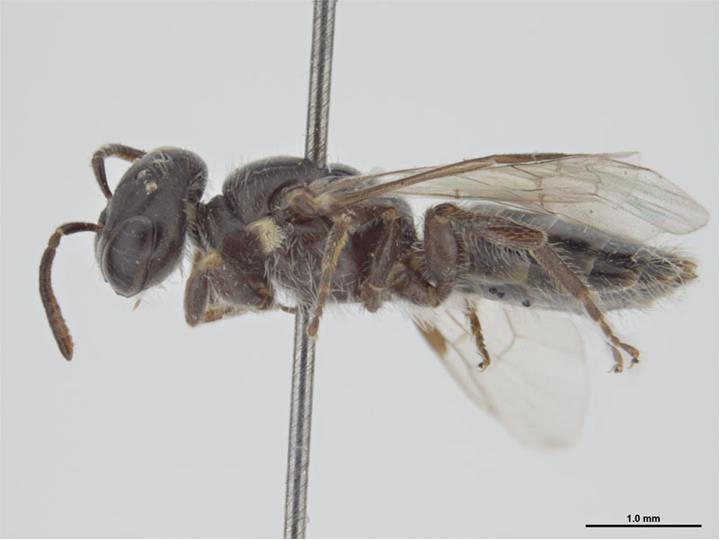
- Female

Scientific classification
- Kingdom: Animalia
- Phylum: Arthropoda
- Clade: Pancrustacea
- Class: Insecta
- Order: Hymenoptera
- Family: Colletidae
- Genus: Euhesma
- Species: E. altitudinis

Binomial name
- Euhesma altitudinis (Cockerell, 1914)

Synonyms
- Euryglossa altitudinis Cockerell, 1914

= Euhesma altitudinis =

Species of bee

Euhesma altitudinis, or Euhesma (Euhesma) altitudinis, is a species of bee in the family Colletidae and the subfamily Euryglossinae. It is endemic to Australia. It was described in 1914 by British-American entomologist Theodore Dru Alison Cockerell.

== Description ==
Male body length is about 4 mm; female body length "a little larger". Colouring is mainly black, yellow and reddish-brown.

== Distribution and habitat ==
The species occurs in south-eastern Australia. The type locality is Mount Lofty in South Australia.

== Behaviour ==
The adults are solitary flying mellivores which nest gregariously in soil. Flowering plants visited by the bees include Leptospermum species.

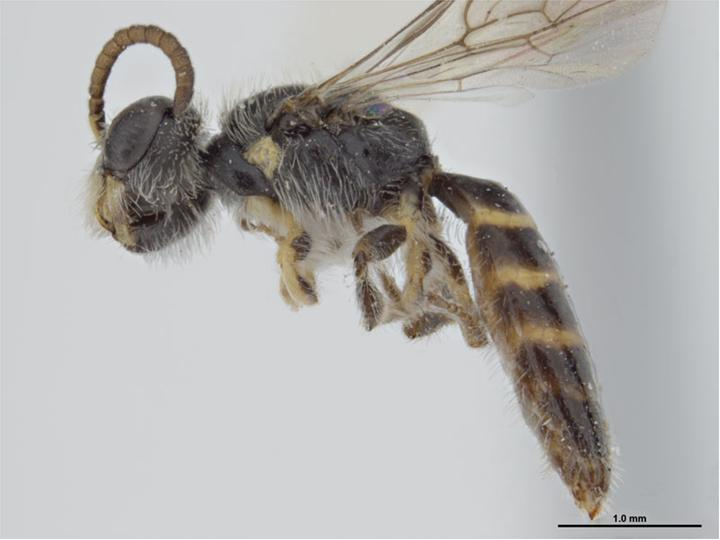
Male
