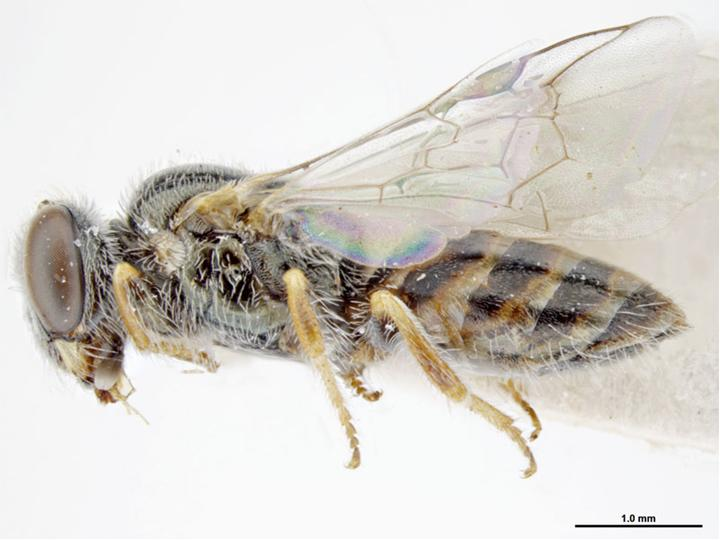
- Female

Scientific classification
- Kingdom: Animalia
- Phylum: Arthropoda
- Clade: Pancrustacea
- Class: Insecta
- Order: Hymenoptera
- Family: Colletidae
- Genus: Euhesma
- Species: E. lobata

Binomial name
- Euhesma lobata Exley, 2001

= Euhesma lobata =

Species of bee

Euhesma lobata, or Euhesma (Euhesma) lobata, is a species of bee in the family Colletidae and the subfamily Euryglossinae. It is endemic to Australia. It was described in 2001 by Australian entomologist Elizabeth Exley.

== Distribution and habitat ==
The species occurs in Western Australia. The type locality is Boorabbin Rock, in the Goldfields–Esperance region.

== Behaviour ==
The adults are flying mellivores. Flowering plants visited by the bees include Grevillea excelsior.

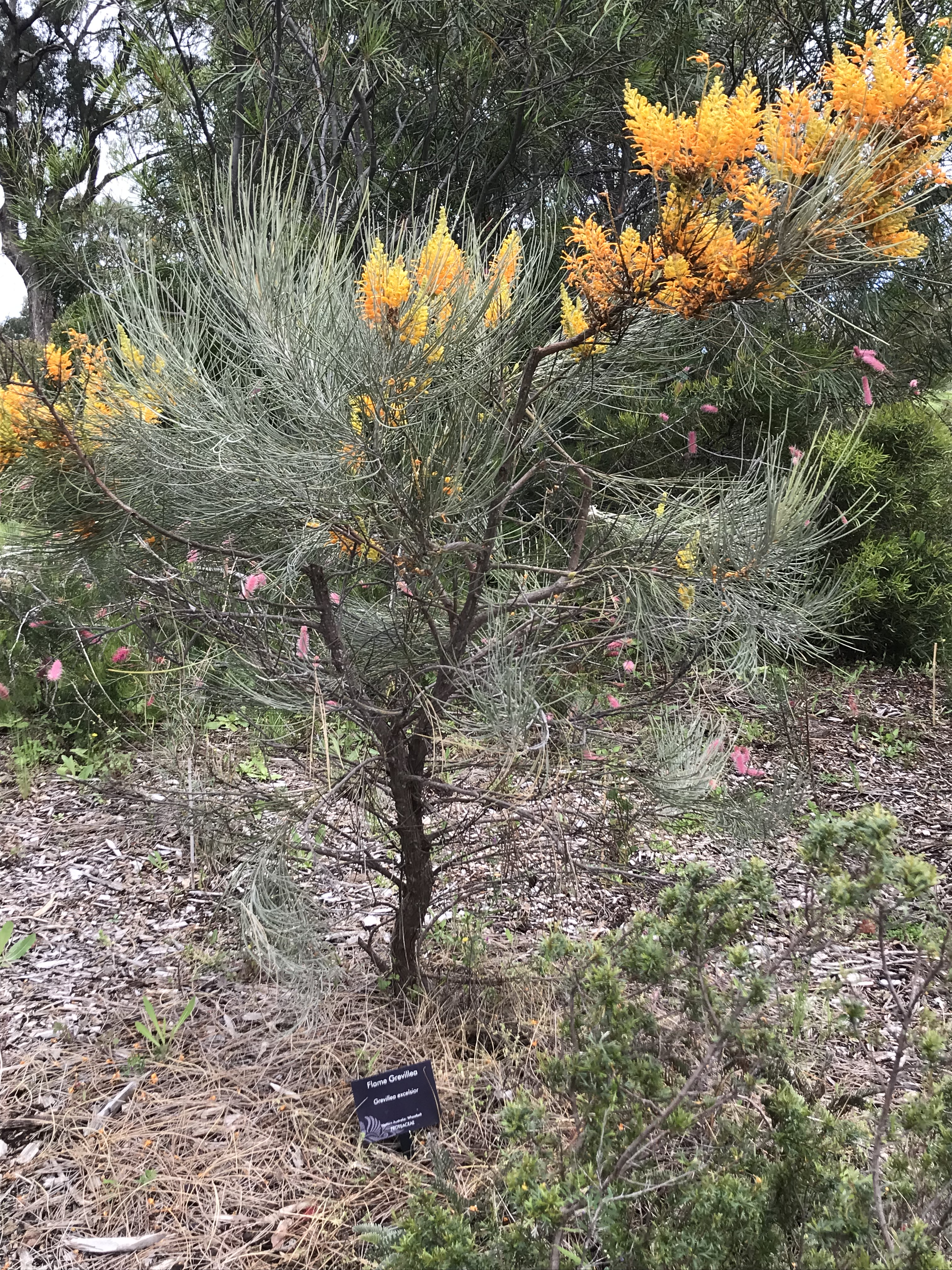
Grevillea excelsior, or flame grevillea, is a favoured forage plant of the bees

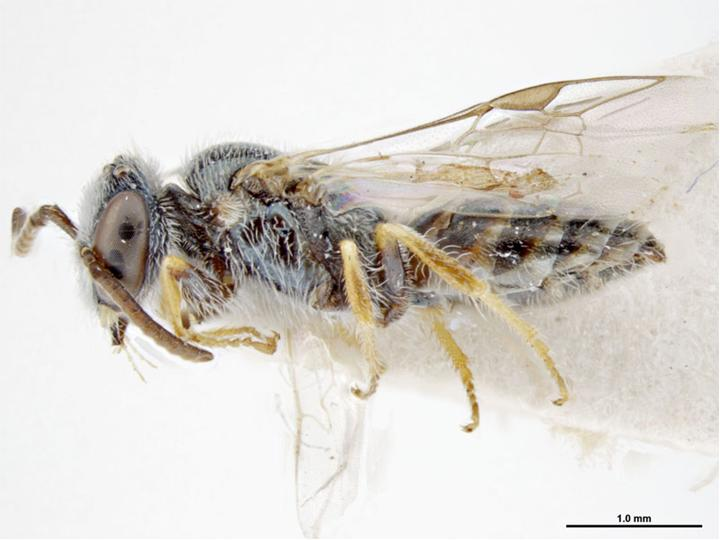
Male
