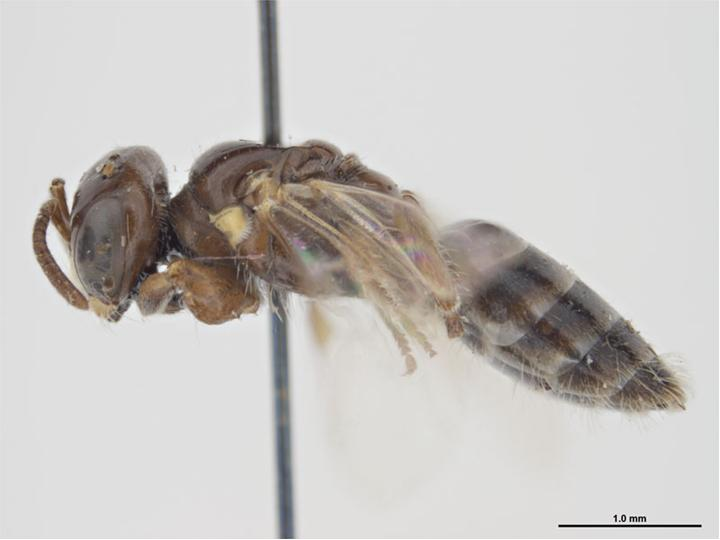
- Female

Scientific classification
- Kingdom: Animalia
- Phylum: Arthropoda
- Clade: Pancrustacea
- Class: Insecta
- Order: Hymenoptera
- Family: Colletidae
- Genus: Euhesma
- Species: E. ridens

Binomial name
- Euhesma ridens (Cockerell, 1913)

Synonyms
- Euryglossa ridens Cockerell, 1913

= Euhesma ridens =

Species of bee

Euhesma ridens, or Euhesma (Euhesma) ridens, is a species of bee in the family Colletidae and the subfamily Euryglossinae. It is endemic to Australia. It was described in 1913 by British-American entomologist Theodore Dru Alison Cockerell.

== Distribution and habitat ==
The species occurs in eastern Australia. The type locality is the Blue Mountains of New South Wales.

== Behaviour ==
The adults are flying mellivores.
