= Euhesma lyngouriae =

Scientific classification
- Kingdom: Animalia
- Phylum: Arthropoda
- Clade: Pancrustacea
- Class: Insecta
- Order: Hymenoptera
- Family: Colletidae
- Genus: Euhesma
- Species: E. lyngouriae

Binomial name
- Euhesma lyngouriae Hogendoorn & Leijs, 2015

Species of bee

Euhesma lyngouriae, or Euhesma (Euhesma) lyngouriae, is a species of bee in the family Colletidae and the subfamily Euryglossinae. It is endemic to Australia. It was described in 2015 by entomologists Katja Hogendoorn and Remko Leijs.

== Etymology ==
The specific epithet lyngouriae refers to the amber coloured legs and gaster of the female.

== Description ==
The female holotype has a body length of 6.0 mm, wing length 3.5 mm, and head width 1.6 mm. Colouration is mainly black, brown, amber and yellow.

== Distribution and habitat ==
The species occurs in South Australia. The type locality is Bon Bon Reserve.

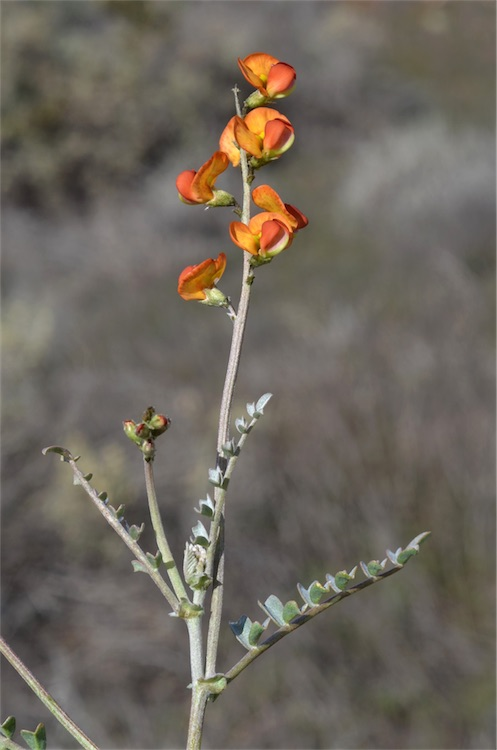
Swainsona stipularis, a forage plant of the bees

== Behaviour ==
The adults are flying mellivores. Flowering plants visited by the bees include Swainsona stipularis.
