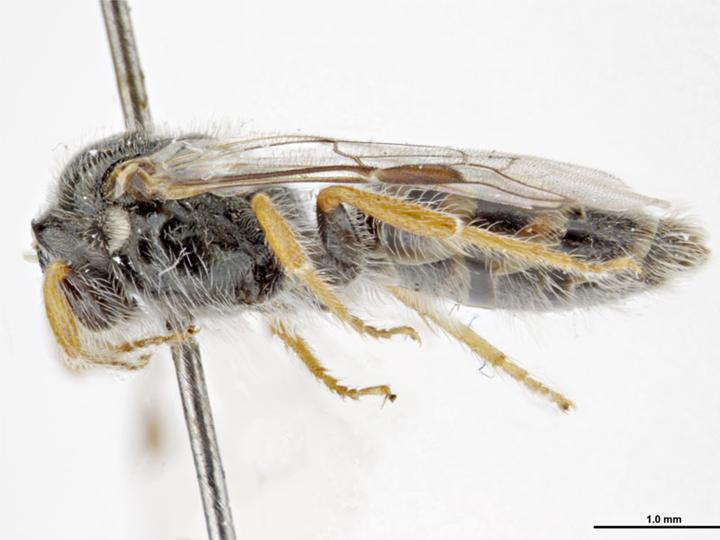
- Female

Scientific classification
- Kingdom: Animalia
- Phylum: Arthropoda
- Clade: Pancrustacea
- Class: Insecta
- Order: Hymenoptera
- Family: Colletidae
- Genus: Euhesma
- Species: E. inconspicua

Binomial name
- Euhesma inconspicua (Cockerell, 1913)

Synonyms
- Euryglossa inconspicua Cockerell, 1913

= Euhesma inconspicua =

Species of bee

Euhesma inconspicua, or Euhesma (Euhesma) inconspicua, is a species of bee in the family Colletidae and the subfamily Euryglossinae. It is endemic to Australia. It was described in 1913 by British-American entomologist Theodore Dru Alison Cockerell.

== Distribution and habitat ==
The species occurs across southern Australia. The type locality is Purnong, South Australia. It has also been recorded from Western Australia and Victoria.

== Behaviour ==
The adults are flying mellivores. Flowering plants visited by the bees include Eucalyptus oleosa and Melaleuca lanceolata.
