= Euhesma endeavouricola =

Scientific classification
- Kingdom: Animalia
- Phylum: Arthropoda
- Clade: Pancrustacea
- Class: Insecta
- Order: Hymenoptera
- Family: Colletidae
- Genus: Euhesma
- Species: E. endeavouricola

Binomial name
- Euhesma endeavouricola (Strand, 1921)

Synonyms
- Euryglossa endeavouricola Strand, 1921

Species of bee

Euhesma endeavouricola is a species of bee in the family Colletidae and the subfamily Euryglossinae. It is endemic to Australia. It was described in 1921 by Norwegian entomologist Embrik Strand.

== Distribution and habitat ==
The species occurs in north-eastern Australia. The type locality is the Endeavour River in Far North Queensland.

== Behaviour ==
The adults are flying mellivores.
