= Euhesma thala =

Scientific classification
- Kingdom: Animalia
- Phylum: Arthropoda
- Clade: Pancrustacea
- Class: Insecta
- Order: Hymenoptera
- Family: Colletidae
- Genus: Euhesma
- Species: E. thala

Binomial name
- Euhesma thala Exley, 2002

Species of bee

Euhesma thala, or Euhesma (Euhesma) thala, is a species of bee in the family Colletidae and the subfamily Euryglossinae. It is endemic to Australia. It was described in 2002 by Australian entomologist Elizabeth Exley.

== Etymology ==
The specific epithet thala is a Western Australian Aboriginal word for 'bee'.

== Description ==
The body length of the female is 10 mm, wing length 6 mm. Colouration is mainly black and yellow.

== Distribution and habitat ==
The species occurs in Western Australia. The type locality is 16 km west-north-west of the Yannarie River crossing on the North West Coastal Highway, in the Pilbara region.

== Behaviour ==
The adults are flying mellivores. Flowering plants visited by the bees include Pileanthus limacis.

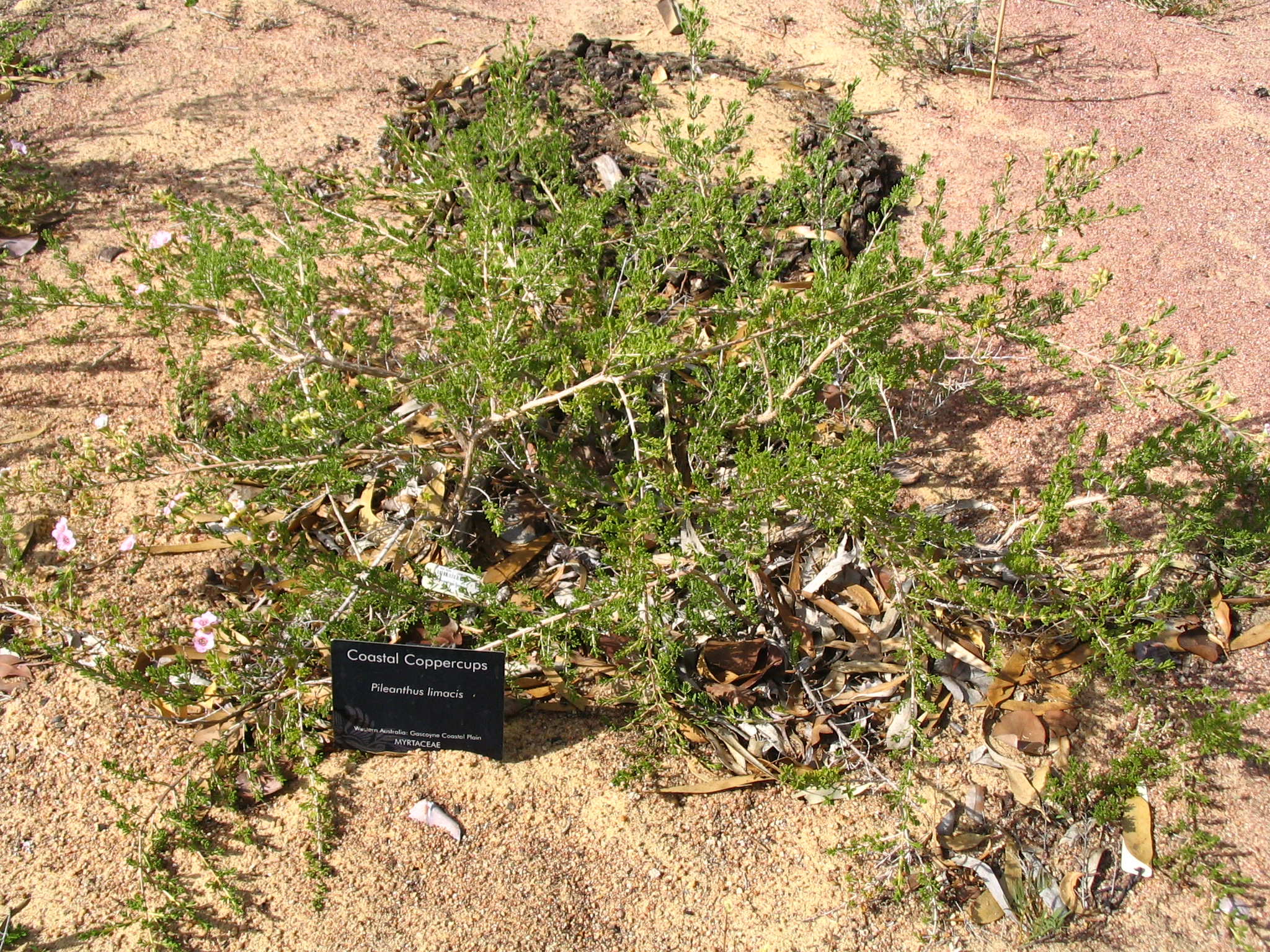
Pileanthus limacis, or coastal coppercups, is a forage plant of the bees
