= Euhesma tuberculipes =

Scientific classification
- Kingdom: Animalia
- Phylum: Arthropoda
- Clade: Pancrustacea
- Class: Insecta
- Order: Hymenoptera
- Family: Colletidae
- Genus: Euhesma
- Species: E. tuberculipes

Binomial name
- Euhesma tuberculipes (Michener, 1965)

Synonyms
- Euryglossa (Parahesma) tuberculipes Michener, 1965

Species of bee

Euhesma tuberculipes, or Euhesma (Parahesma) tuberculipes, is a species of bee in the family Colletidae and the subfamily Euryglossinae. It is endemic to Australia. It was described in 1965 by American entomologist Charles Duncan Michener.

== Distribution and habitat ==
The species occurs in Victoria. A more precise type locality is unknown.

== Behaviour ==
The adults are flying mellivores.
