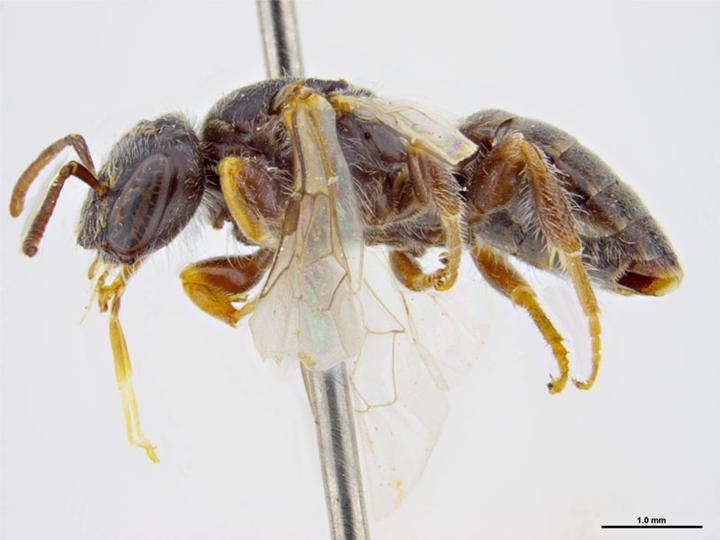
- Male

Scientific classification
- Kingdom: Animalia
- Phylum: Arthropoda
- Clade: Pancrustacea
- Class: Insecta
- Order: Hymenoptera
- Family: Colletidae
- Genus: Euhesma
- Species: E. coppinensis

Binomial name
- Euhesma coppinensis (Exley, 1998)

Synonyms
- Euryglossa (Euhesma) coppinensis Exley, 1998

= Euhesma coppinensis =

Species of bee

Euhesma coppinensis, or Euhesma (Euhesma) coppinensis, is a species of bee in the family Colletidae and the subfamily Euryglossinae. It is endemic to Australia. It was described in 1998 by Australian entomologist Elizabeth Exley.

== Etymology ==
The specific epithet coppinensis refers to the type locality.

== Description ==
Body length of the female is 6.0 mm, wing length 4.5 mm; body length of the male 6.0 mm, wing length 4.5 mm. Colouration is mainly black, brown and yellowish.

== Distribution and habitat ==
The species occurs in north-west Western Australia. The type locality is Coppin Pool, 30 km south of Mount Bruce in the Pilbara.

== Behaviour ==
The adults are flying mellivores. Flowering plants visited by the bees include Eremophila species.
