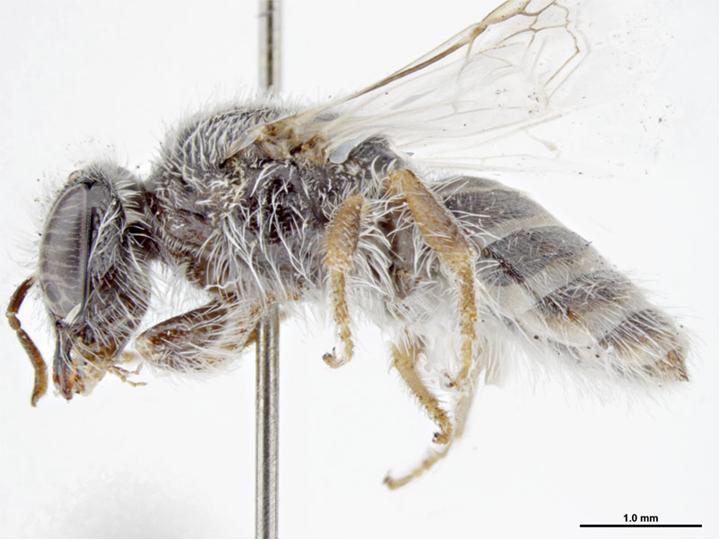
- Female

Scientific classification
- Kingdom: Animalia
- Phylum: Arthropoda
- Clade: Pancrustacea
- Class: Insecta
- Order: Hymenoptera
- Family: Colletidae
- Genus: Euhesma
- Species: E. semaphore

Binomial name
- Euhesma semaphore (Houston, 1992)

Synonyms
- Euryglossa (Euhesma) semaphore Houston, 1992

= Euhesma semaphore =

Species of bee

Euhesma semaphore, or Euhesma (Euhesma) semaphore, is a species of bee in the family Colletidae and the subfamily Euryglossinae. It is endemic to Australia. It was described in 1992 by Australian entomologist Terry Houston.

== Etymology ==
The specific epithet semaphore is an anatomical reference to the flag-like apices of the male antennae.

== Description ==
Body length of females is 5.8 mm, that of males 5 mm. Colouration is mainly black, brown and cream.

== Distribution and habitat ==
The species occurs in south-west Western Australia. The type locality is 10.5 km south of Eneabba.

== Behaviour ==
The adults are solitary flying mellivores. Flowering plants visited by the bees include Pileanthus filifolius.

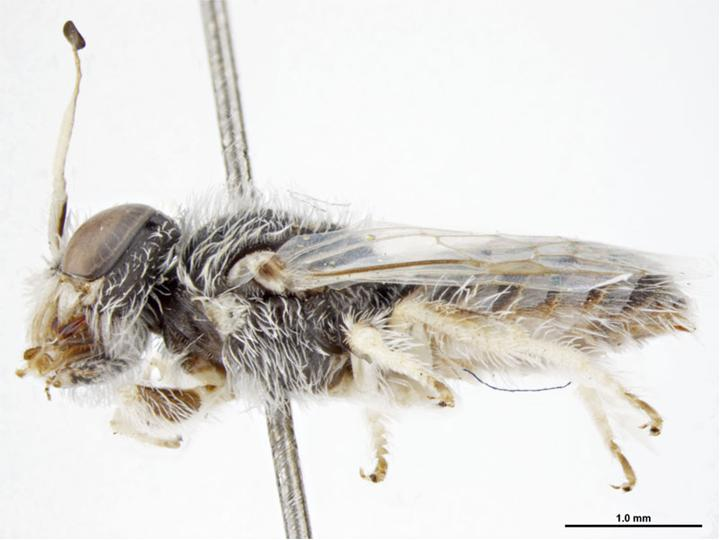
Male
