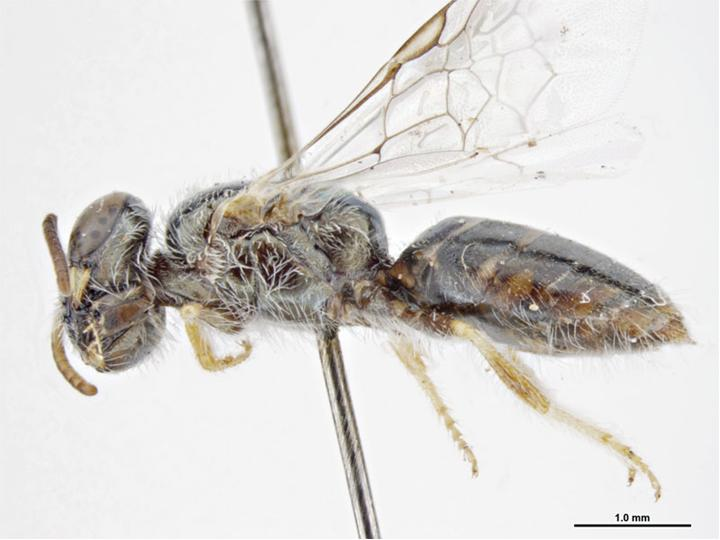
- Female

Scientific classification
- Kingdom: Animalia
- Phylum: Arthropoda
- Clade: Pancrustacea
- Class: Insecta
- Order: Hymenoptera
- Family: Colletidae
- Genus: Euhesma
- Species: E. viridescens

Binomial name
- Euhesma viridescens Exley, 2001

= Euhesma viridescens =

Species of bee

Euhesma viridescens, or Euhesma (Euhesma) viridescens, is a species of bee in the family Colletidae and the subfamily Euryglossinae. It is endemic to Australia. It was described in 2001 by Australian entomologist Elizabeth Exley.

== Distribution and habitat ==
The species occurs in central Australia. The type locality is 8 km west of Alice Springs, in the south of the Northern Territory.

== Behaviour ==
The adults are flying mellivores.
