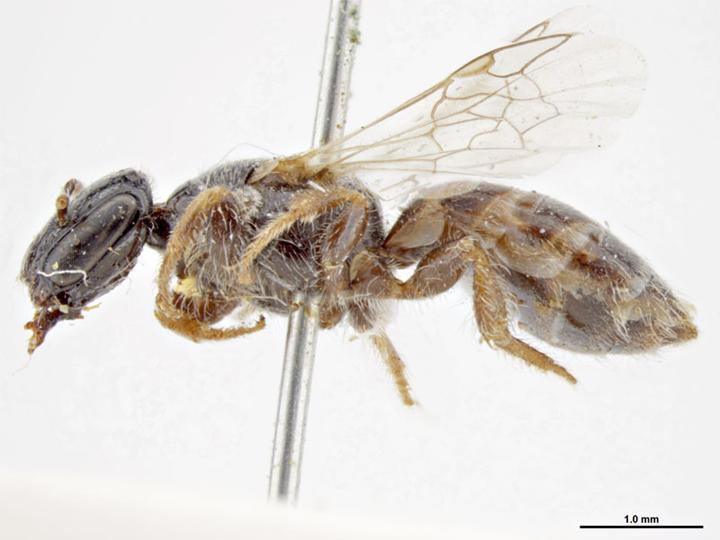
- Female

Scientific classification
- Kingdom: Animalia
- Phylum: Arthropoda
- Clade: Pancrustacea
- Class: Insecta
- Order: Hymenoptera
- Family: Colletidae
- Genus: Euhesma
- Species: E. dolichocephala

Binomial name
- Euhesma dolichocephala (Rayment, 1953)

Synonyms
- Euryglossa dolichocephala Rayment, 1953

= Euhesma dolichocephala =

Species of bee

Euhesma dolichocephala, or Euhesma (Euhesma) dolichocephala, is a species of bee in the family Colletidae and the subfamily Euryglossinae. It is endemic to Australia. It was described in 1953 by Australian entomologist Tarlton Rayment.

== Etymology ==
The specific epithet dolichocephala is an anatomical reference to the "excessively long head".

== Description ==
The female body length is 5.5 mm, male body length 4 mm. The colouring is mainly black.

== Distribution and habitat ==
The species occurs in Victoria. The type locality is Lake Hattah in the Mallee region.

== Behaviour ==
The adults are flying mellivores.

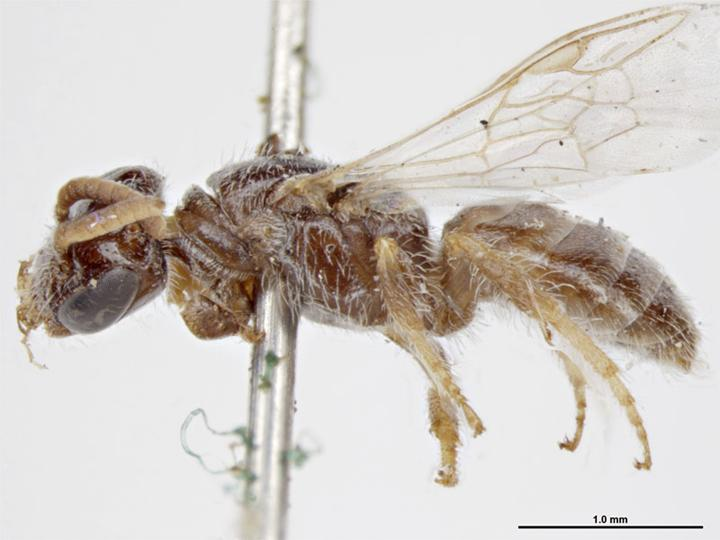
Male
