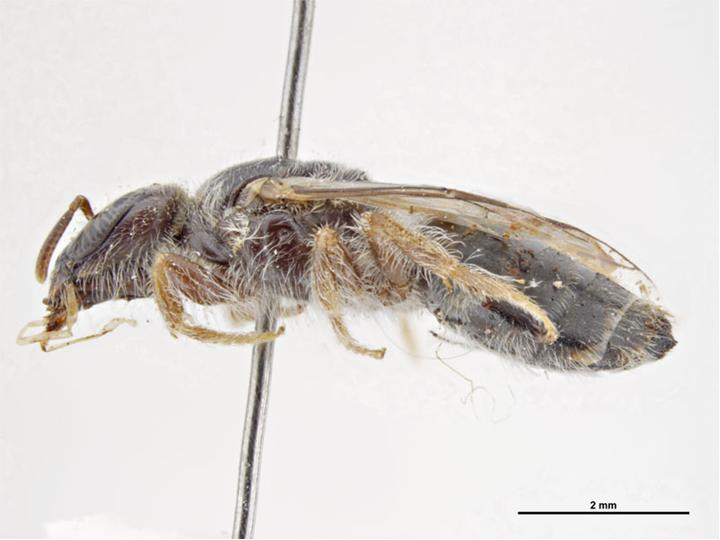
- Female

Scientific classification
- Kingdom: Animalia
- Phylum: Arthropoda
- Clade: Pancrustacea
- Class: Insecta
- Order: Hymenoptera
- Family: Colletidae
- Genus: Euhesma
- Species: E. alicia

Binomial name
- Euhesma alicia (Exley, 1998)

Synonyms
- Euryglossa (Euhesma) alicia Exley, 1998

= Euhesma alicia =

Species of bee

Euhesma alicia, or Euhesma (Euhesma) alicia, is a species of bee in the family Colletidae and the subfamily Euryglossinae. It is endemic to Australia. It was described in 1998 by Australian entomologist Elizabeth Exley.

== Etymology ==
The specific epithet alicia refers to the type locality.

== Description ==
Body length of the female holotype is 7.0 mm, wing length 5 mm. Colouration is black, dark brown and yellowish.

== Distribution and habitat ==
The species occurs in central Australia. The type locality is 53 km east by north of Alice Springs in the south of the Northern Territory.

== Behaviour ==
The adults are solitary flying mellivores. Flowering plants visited by the bees include Eremophila species.
