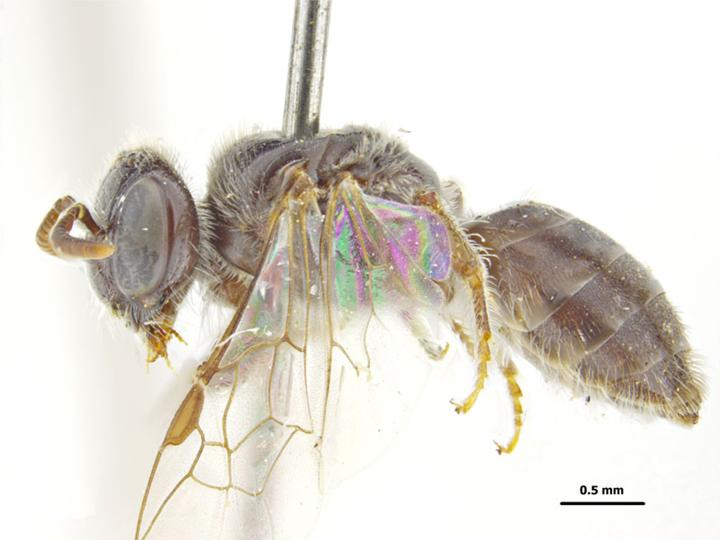
- Female

Scientific classification
- Kingdom: Animalia
- Phylum: Arthropoda
- Clade: Pancrustacea
- Class: Insecta
- Order: Hymenoptera
- Family: Colletidae
- Genus: Euhesma
- Species: E. hyphesmoides

Binomial name
- Euhesma hyphesmoides (Michener, 1965)

Synonyms
- Euryglossa (Euhesma) hyphesmoides Michener, 1965

= Euhesma hyphesmoides =

Species of bee

Euhesma hyphesmoides, or Euhesma (Euhesma) hyphesmoides, is a species of bee in the family Colletidae and the subfamily Euryglossinae. It is endemic to Australia. It was described in 1965 by American entomologist Charles Duncan Michener.

== Distribution and habitat ==
The species occurs in eastern Australia. The type locality is Mutdapilly in south-east Queensland.

== Behaviour ==
The adults are flying mellivores. Flowering plants visited by the bees include Eucalyptus species.
