= Euhesma perditiformis =

Scientific classification
- Kingdom: Animalia
- Phylum: Arthropoda
- Clade: Pancrustacea
- Class: Insecta
- Order: Hymenoptera
- Family: Colletidae
- Genus: Euhesma
- Species: E. perditiformis

Binomial name
- Euhesma perditiformis (Cockerell, 1910)

Synonyms
- Euryglossa perditiformis Cockerell, 1910

Species of bee

Euhesma perditiformis, or Euhesma (Euhesma) perditiformis, is a species of bee in the family Colletidae and the subfamily Euryglossinae. It is endemic to Australia. It was described in 1910 by British-American entomologist Theodore Dru Alison Cockerell.

== Distribution and habitat ==
The species occurs in eastern Australia. The type locality is Mackay, Queensland. It has also been recorded from Gosford, New South Wales.

== Behaviour ==
The adults are flying mellivores.
