= Euhesma pernana =

Scientific classification
- Kingdom: Animalia
- Phylum: Arthropoda
- Clade: Pancrustacea
- Class: Insecta
- Order: Hymenoptera
- Family: Colletidae
- Genus: Euhesma
- Species: E. pernana

Binomial name
- Euhesma pernana (Cockerell, 1905)

Synonyms
- Euryglossa pernana Cockerell, 1905

Species of bee

Euhesma pernana, or Euhesma (Euhesma) pernana, is a species of bee in the family Colletidae and the subfamily Euryglossinae. It is endemic to Australia. It was described in 1905 by British-American entomologist Theodore Dru Alison Cockerell.

== Distribution and habitat ==
The species occurs in south-west Western Australia. The type locality is Fremantle.

== Behaviour ==
The adults are flying mellivores.
