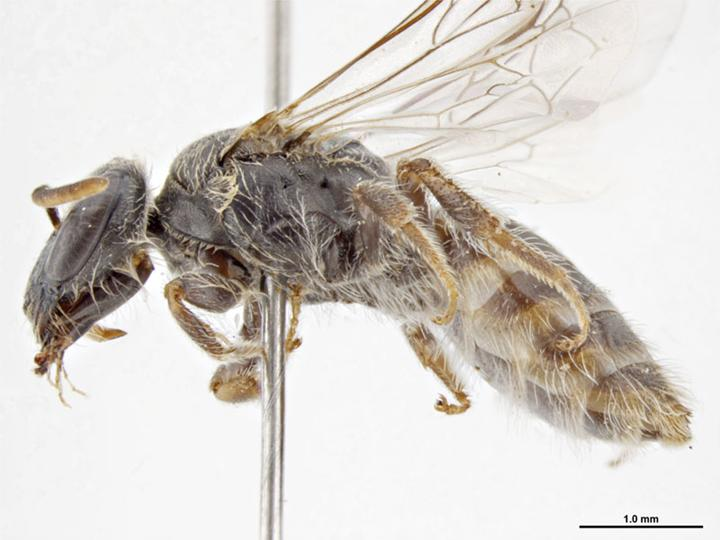
- Female

Scientific classification
- Kingdom: Animalia
- Phylum: Arthropoda
- Clade: Pancrustacea
- Class: Insecta
- Order: Hymenoptera
- Family: Colletidae
- Genus: Euhesma
- Species: E. balladonia

Binomial name
- Euhesma balladonia (Exley, 1998)

Synonyms
- Euryglossa (Euhesma) balladonia Exley, 1998

= Euhesma balladonia =

Species of bee

Euhesma balladonia, or Euhesma (Euhesma) balladonia, is a species of bee in the family Colletidae and the subfamily Euryglossinae. It is endemic to Australia. It was described in 1998 by Australian entomologist Elizabeth Exley.

== Etymology ==
The specific epithet balladonia refers to the type locality.

== Description ==
Body length of the female is 5.5 mm, wing length 4.0 mm; body length of the male 5.0 mm, wing length 4.0 mm. Colouration is black and shades of brown.

== Distribution and habitat ==
The species occurs in southern Western Australia. The type locality is 35 km north-west by west from Balladonia Roadhouse.

== Behaviour ==
The adults are flying mellivores. Flowering plants visited by the bees include Eremophila species.
