= Dicrastylis cundeeleensis =

Conservation status
- Priority Four — Rare Taxa (DEC)

Scientific classification
- Kingdom: Plantae
- Clade: Tracheophytes
- Clade: Angiosperms
- Clade: Eudicots
- Clade: Asterids
- Order: Lamiales
- Family: Lamiaceae
- Genus: Dicrastylis
- Species: D. cundeeleensis

Binomial name
- Dicrastylis cundeeleensis Munir
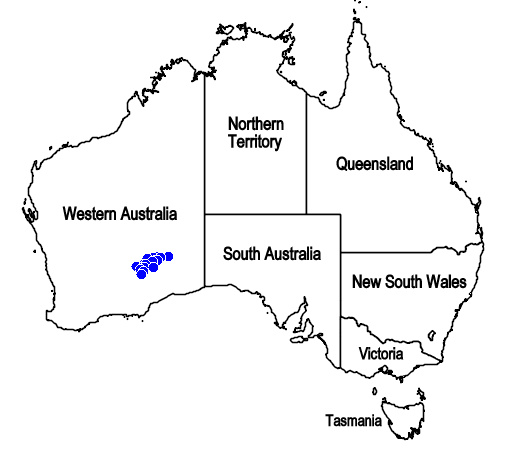

Species of flowering plant

Dicrastylis cundeeleensis is a species of plant within the genus, Dicrastylis, in the family Lamiaceae. It is endemic to the south of Western Australia.

== Description ==
Dicrastylis cundeeleensis is a woolly shrub, growing from 20 cm to 50 cm high, in yellow red or yellow-red sands, on sandplains. Its stems are roughly circular in cross section, and have no peltate scales. The opposite and entire leaves are 4–25 mm long by 1.3-3.5 mm wide, and have branched (dendritic) hairs, and a blistered, puckered surface. There are no bracteoles, but there are bracts which are 2 mm long. The flowers stalks are 1.5–2 mm long, and have both dendritic and peltate scale hairs. The calyx has five lobes (1–2 mm long), and is covered in dendritic hairs, and the white or cream corolla is 3.5–6 mm long, with no dots or stripes in its throat. There are five stamens. Flowers may be seen in January, June, October or November.

This species is thought to hybridise with D. brunnea.

It is found in Beard's Eremaean Province.

== Taxonomy ==
It was first described by Barbara Lynette Rye in 2007 as Dicrastylis cundeeleensis. The specific epithet, cundeleensis, indicates that this species is found in the Cundelee area ("from Cundelee"). There are no synonyms.
