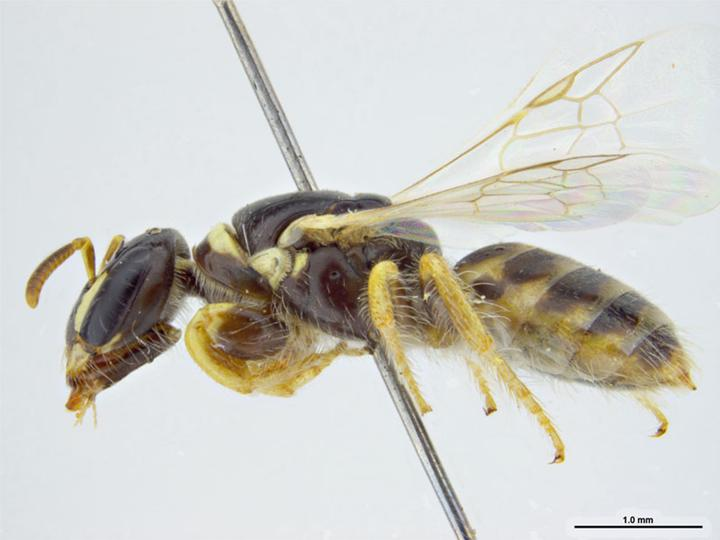
- Female

Scientific classification
- Kingdom: Animalia
- Phylum: Arthropoda
- Clade: Pancrustacea
- Class: Insecta
- Order: Hymenoptera
- Family: Colletidae
- Genus: Euhesma
- Species: E. acantha

Binomial name
- Euhesma acantha Exley, 2004

= Euhesma acantha =

Species of bee

Euhesma acantha, or Euhesma (Euhesma) acantha, is a species of bee in the family Colletidae and the subfamily Euryglossinae. It is endemic to Australia. It was described in 2004 by Australian entomologist Elizabeth Exley.

== Distribution and habitat ==
The species occurs in central Australia. The type locality is Windorah in Central West Queensland. It has also been recorded from the Northern Territory.

== Behaviour ==
The adults are flying mellivores. Flowering plants visited by the bees include Dicrastylis lewellinii species.

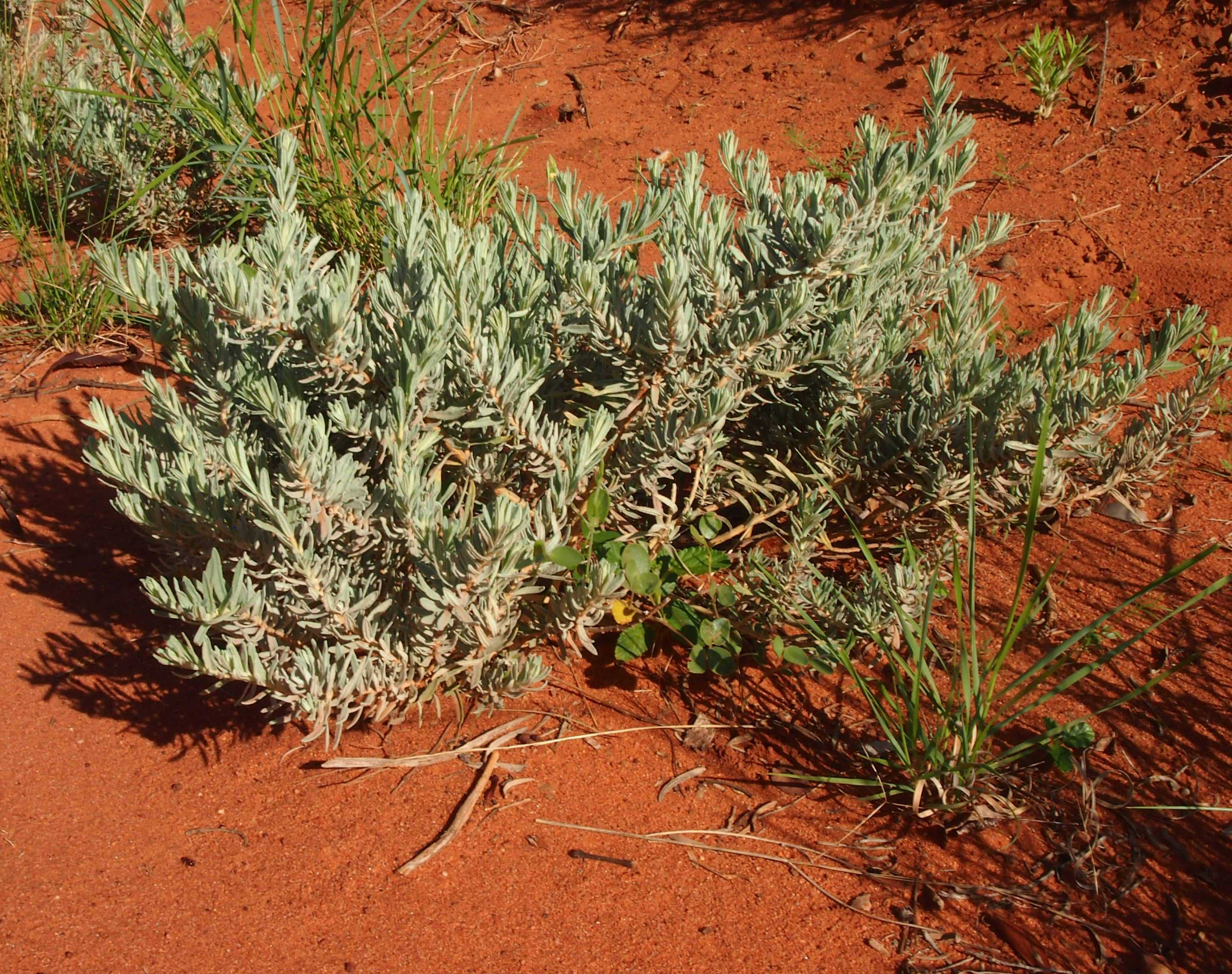
Dicrastylis lewellinii, a forage plant of the bees

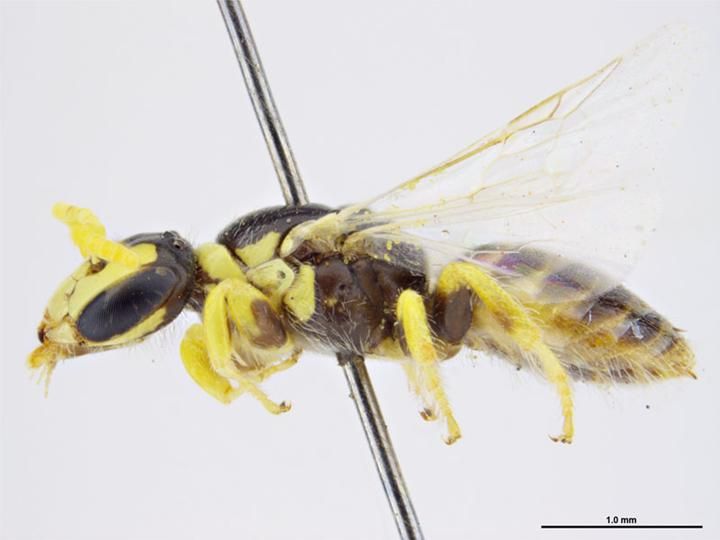
Male
