= Dicrastylis soliparma =

Scientific classification
- Kingdom: Plantae
- Clade: Tracheophytes
- Clade: Angiosperms
- Clade: Eudicots
- Clade: Asterids
- Order: Lamiales
- Family: Lamiaceae
- Genus: Dicrastylis
- Species: D. soliparma

Binomial name
- Dicrastylis soliparma Rye & Trudgen
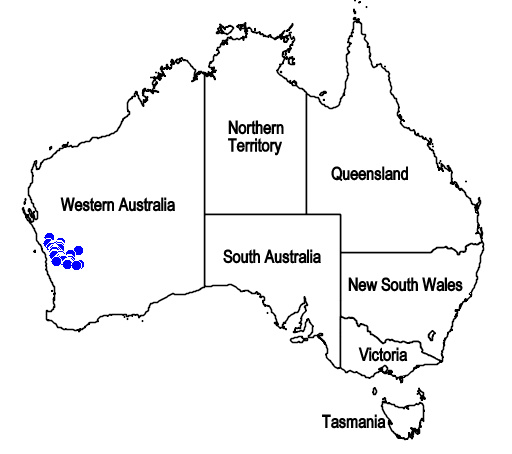

Species of flowering plant

Dicrastylis soliparma is a species of plant within the genus, Dicrastylis, in the family Lamiaceae. It is endemic to Western Australia.

== Description ==
Dicrastylis soliparma is spreading shrub, growing from 30 cm to 1.5 m high, on sandy soils, on sandplains and road verges. Its stems are roughly circular in cross section, with a dense white or rusty coloured covering when young, and have no peltate scales. The opposite and entire leaves are 7–25 mm long by 3.5–7 mm wide, and have branched (dendritic) hairs, and a blistered, puckered surface. There are no bracteoles, but there are bracts which are 1–2.5 mm long. The flower stalks are 2–4.5 mm long, and have both dendritic and peltate scale hairs. The calyx has five lobes (1–2 mm long), and is covered in dendritic hairs, and the white or cream corolla is 3–6.2 mm long, with no dots or stripes in its throat. There are five stamens. Flowers may be seen from October to December.

It is found in Beard's Eremaean and South-West Provinces.

== Taxonomy ==
It was first described by Barbara Rye and Malcolm Trudgen in 1998 as Dicrastylis soliparma. There are no synonyms.
