= Dicrastylis kumarinensis =

Scientific classification
- Kingdom: Plantae
- Clade: Tracheophytes
- Clade: Angiosperms
- Clade: Eudicots
- Clade: Asterids
- Order: Lamiales
- Family: Lamiaceae
- Genus: Dicrastylis
- Species: D. kumarinensis

Binomial name
- Dicrastylis kumarinensis Munir
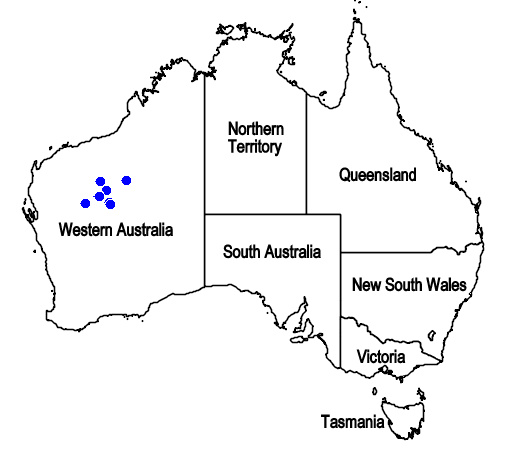

Species of flowering plant

Dicrastylis kumarinensis is a species of plant within the genus, Dicrastylis, in the family Lamiaceae. It is endemic to Western Australia.

== Description ==
Dicrastylis kumarinensis is an erect shrub, growing from 40 cm to 80 cm high, in red sands, on hillsides and rangelands. Its stems are roughly circular in cross section, and have no peltate scales. The opposite and entire leaves are 1.5-11.5 cm long by 3–15 mm wide, and have branched (dendritic) hairs, and a blistered, puckered surface. There are no bracteoles, but there are bracts which are 3-3.5 mm long. The flowers stalks are 1.5–3 mm long, and have both dendritic and peltate scale hairs. The calyx has five lobes (1.5-2.7 mm long), and is covered in dendritic hairs, and the yellow, white or cream corolla is 4.5–6 mm long, with no dots or stripes in its throat. There are five stamens. The flowering time is uncertain and may be in month of the year.

It is found in Beard's Eremaean Province.

== Taxonomy ==
It was first described by Barbara Lynette Rye in 2007 as Dicrastylis kumarinensis, from a specimen (PERTH 01869175) collected in 1978 by A.A. Mitchell, just north of Kumarina, a Western Australian town which gave the specific epithet, kumarensis ("from Kumarina"). There are no synonyms.
