= Leioproctus nix =

Scientific classification
- Kingdom: Animalia
- Phylum: Arthropoda
- Clade: Pancrustacea
- Class: Insecta
- Order: Hymenoptera
- Family: Colletidae
- Genus: Leioproctus
- Species: L. nix

Binomial name
- Leioproctus nix Batley, 2013

Species of bee

Leioproctus nix, or Leioproctus (Protomorpha) nix, is a species of bee in the family Colletidae and subfamily Colletinae. It is endemic to Australia. It was described by entomologist Michael Batley in 2013.

== Etymology ==
The specific epithet nix (Latin: "snow") refers to the dense white facial hair of the female.

== Description ==
Male body length is about 6.9 mm, head width 2 mm; female body length 7.3 mm, head width 2.4 mm. Integumental colouration is mainly black with orange and brown markings; the hair is mostly white.

== Distribution and habitat ==
The species occurs in the Channel Country of far western Queensland. The type locality is the ephemeral Field River, near Ethabuka Reserve, on the edge of the Simpson Desert.

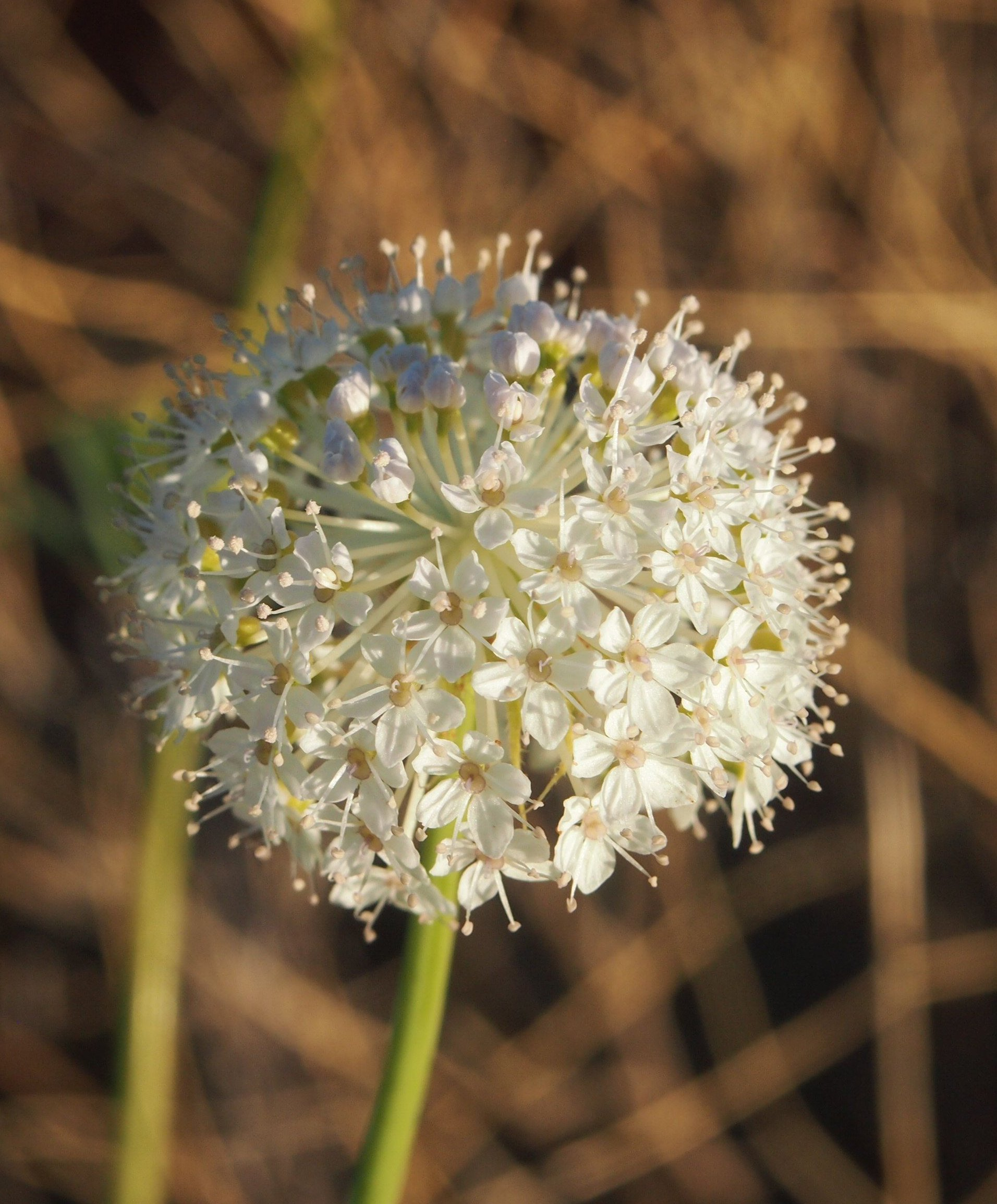
Flowers of Trachymene glaucifolia (native carrot), a forage plant of the bees

== Behaviour ==
The adults are flying mellivores. Flowering plants visited by the bees include Trachymene glaucifolia, Dicrastylis costelloi, Brunonia australis and Trianthema pilosum.

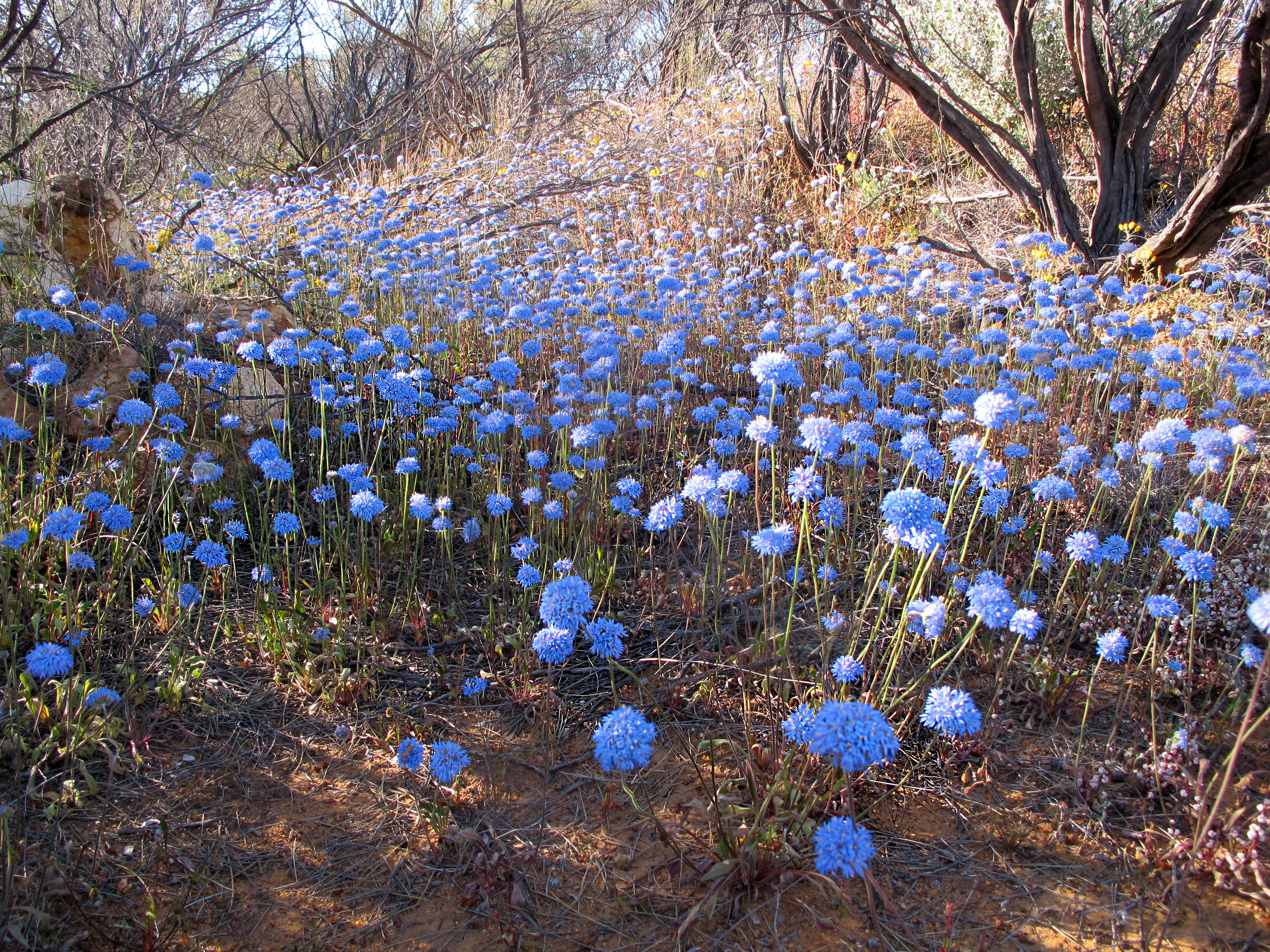
Flowering Brunonia australis (blue pincushions), a forage plant of the bees
