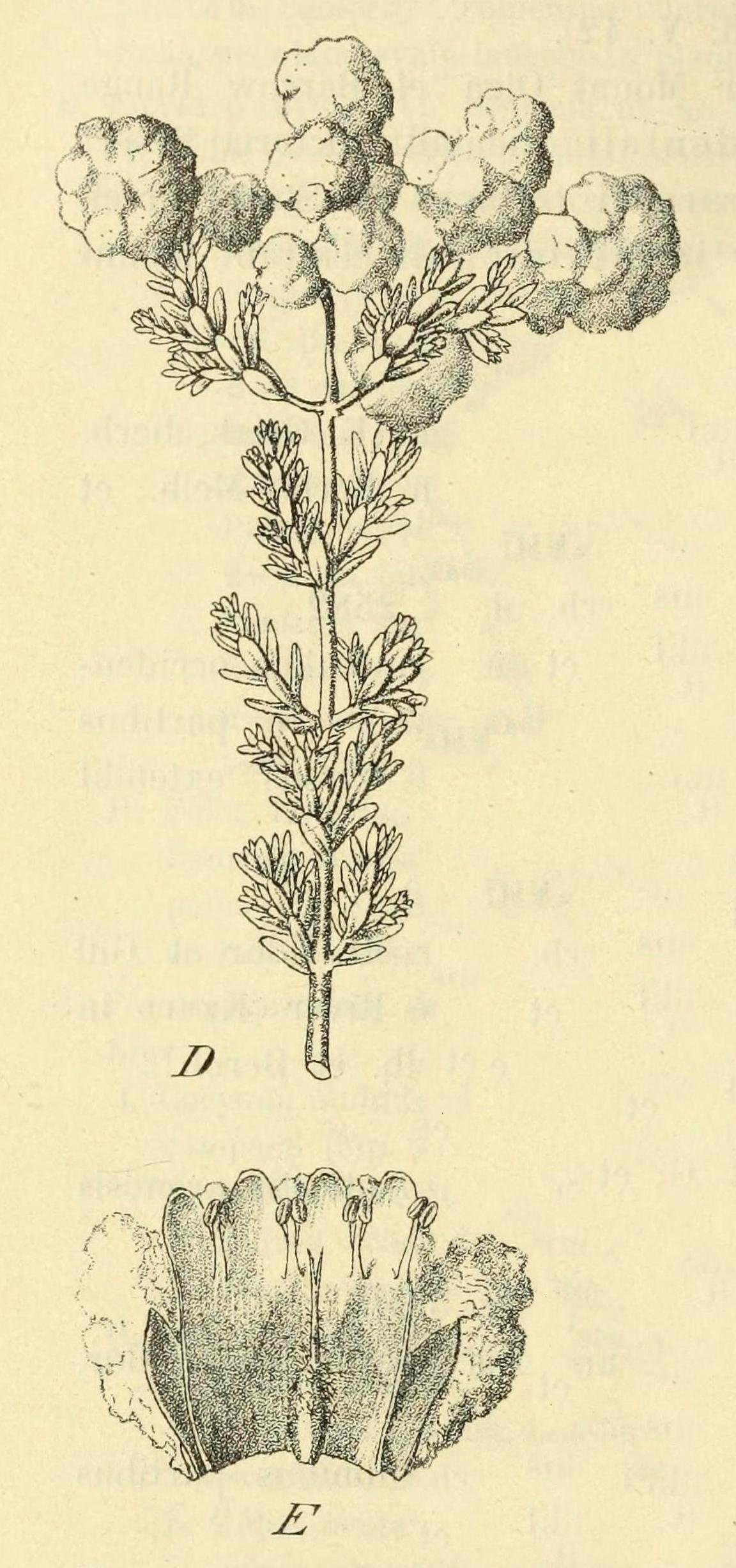

Scientific classification
- Kingdom: Plantae
- Clade: Tracheophytes
- Clade: Angiosperms
- Clade: Eudicots
- Clade: Asterids
- Order: Lamiales
- Family: Lamiaceae
- Genus: Dicrastylis
- Species: D. corymbosa

Binomial name
- Dicrastylis corymbosa (Endl.) Munir
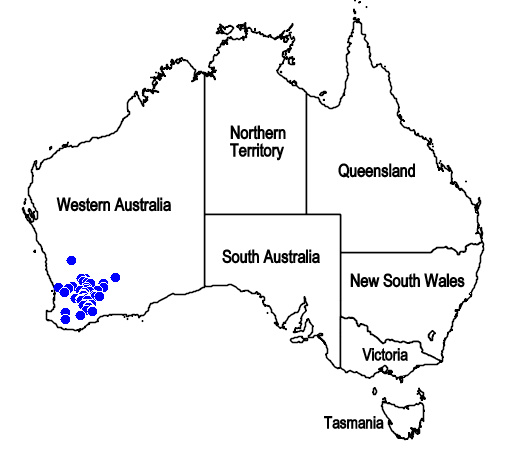

Synonyms
- Dicrastylis glauca Munir; Dicrastylis stoechas Drumm. ex Harv. Dicrastylis thomasiae S.Moore; Mallophora corymbosa Endl.

= Dicrastylis corymbosa =

Species of flowering plant

Dicrastylis corymbosa is a species of plant within the genus, Dicrastylis, in the family Lamiaceae. It is endemic to Western Australia.

== Description ==
Dicrastylis corymbosa is a many branched shrub, growing to 30 cm high, in yellow and brown sands. Its stems are roughly circular in cross section, and having no peltate scales. The opposite and entire leaves are 4–15 mm long by 2–5 mm wide, and have branched (dendritic) hairs. There are no bracteoles, but there are bracts which are 4.5-6. mm long. The flower stalks are 0.5-1.2 mm long, and have dendritic hairs, and peltate scales hairs. The calyx has five lobes (1.3–2 mm long), and is covered in dendritic hairs, and the white to cream corolla is 3.8-4.5 mm long, with no dots or stripes in its throat. There are five stamens.

It is found in Beard's Eremaean, and South-West Provinces.

== Taxonomy ==
It was first described by Stephan Endlicher in 1838 as Mallophora corymbosa, but was assigned to the genus, Dicrastylis by Ahmad Abid Munir in 1978 to give Dicrastylis corymbosa.
