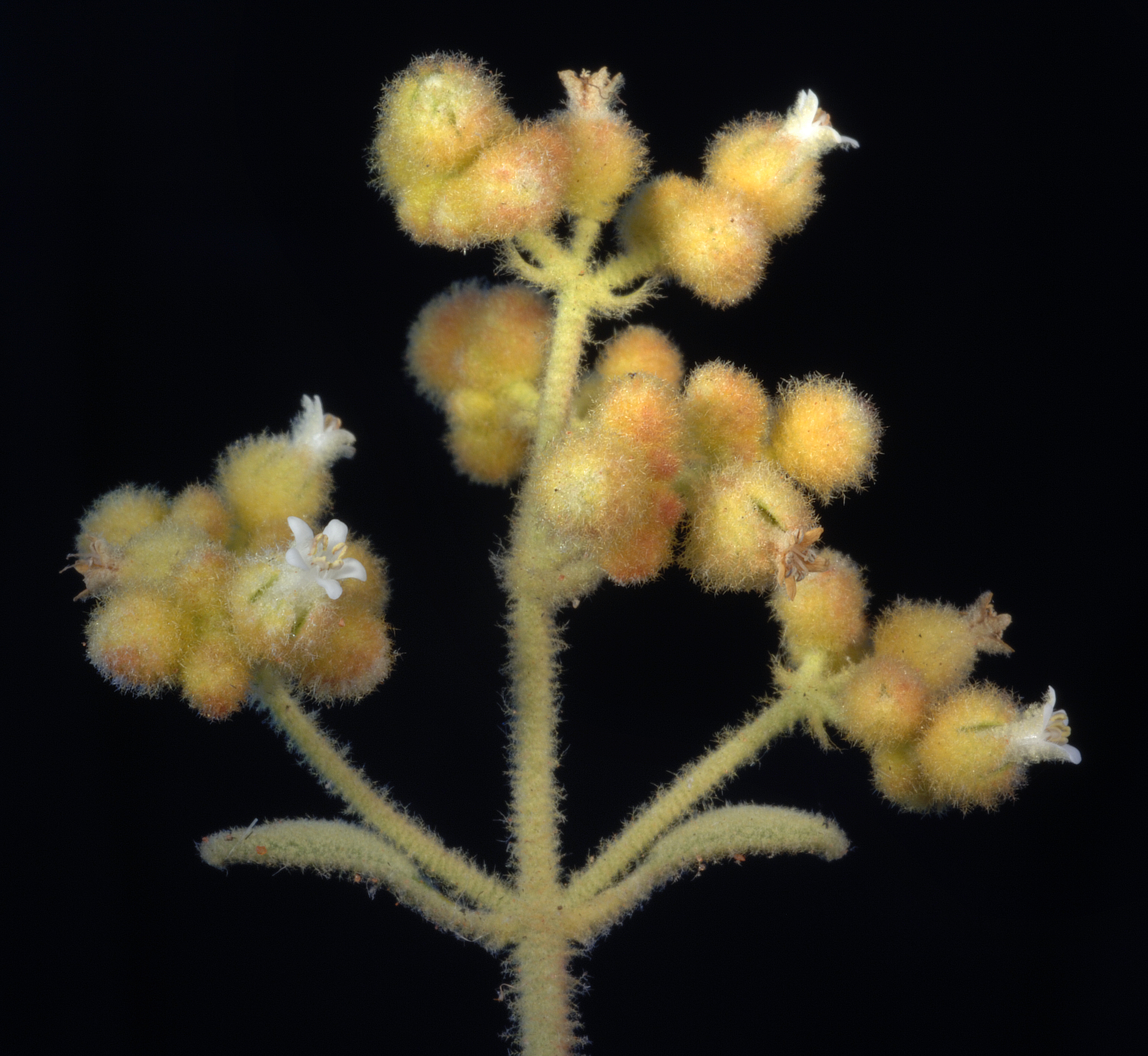
- Dicrastylis exsuccosa

Scientific classification
- Kingdom: Plantae
- Clade: Tracheophytes
- Clade: Angiosperms
- Clade: Eudicots
- Clade: Asterids
- Order: Lamiales
- Family: Lamiaceae
- Genus: Dicrastylis
- Species: D. exsuccosa

Binomial name
- Dicrastylis exsuccosa (F.Muell.) Druce
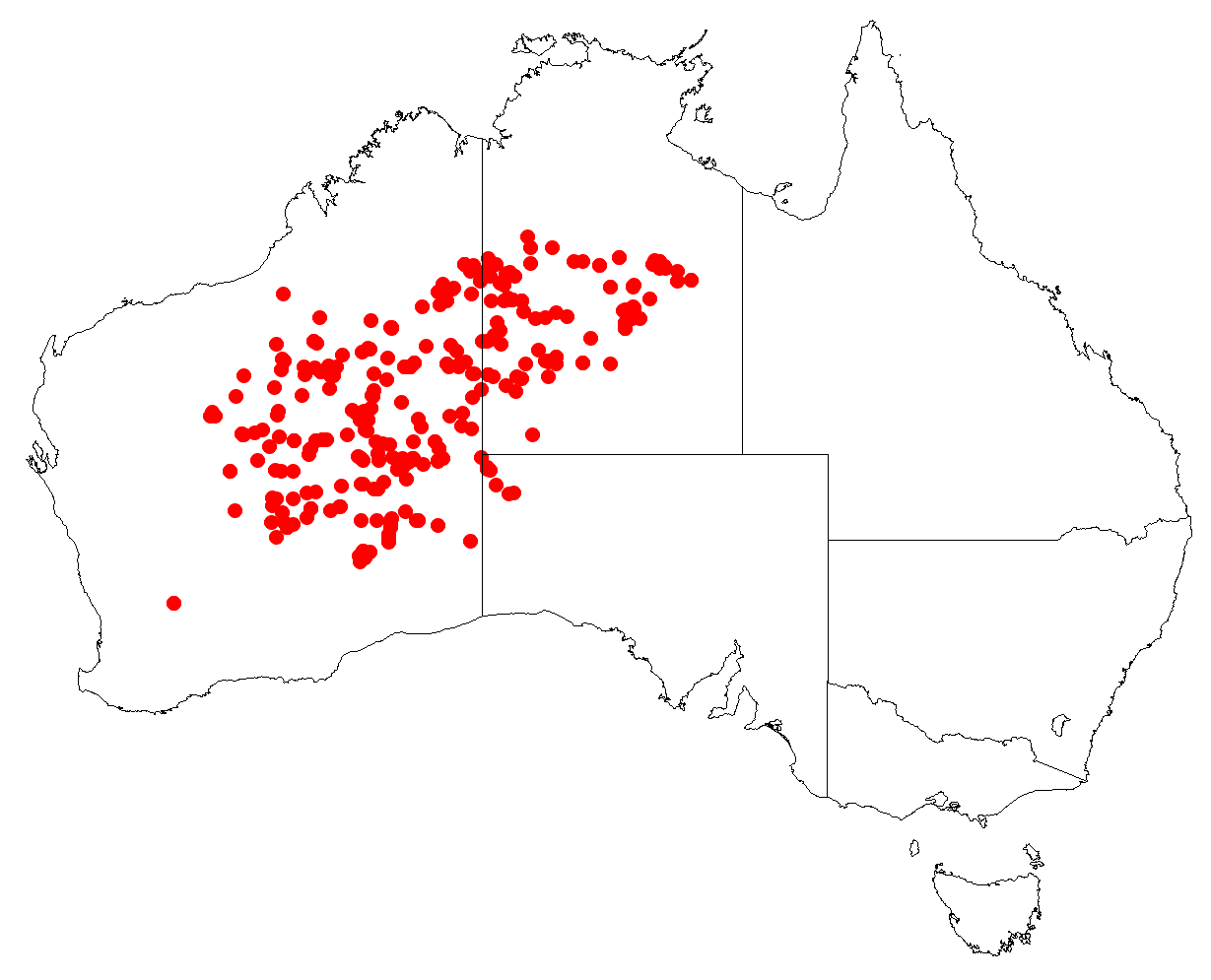
- Collections data (AVH): D. exsuccosa

Synonyms
- Dicrastylis exsuccosa f.albolutea Munir; Dicrastylis exsuccosa f. lachnophylla Munir; Dicrastylis exsuccosa subsp. cinerea Munir; Dicrastylis exsuccosa subsp. elliptica Munir; Dicrastylis exsuccosa subsp. wilsonii Munir; Dicrastylis exsuccosa var. lanceolata Munir; Dicrastylis exsuccosa var. tomentosa Munir; Dicrastylis ochrotricha F.Muell. Pityrodia exsuccosa F.Muell.

= Dicrastylis exsuccosa =

Species of plant

Dicrastylis exsuccosa is a species of plant within the genus Dicrastylis in the family Lamiaceae. It is endemic to inland Australia and found in Western Australia, the Northern Territory, and South Australia.

== Description ==
Dicrastylis exsuccosa is a shrub 0.3 to 1.5 m high which grows on sand-dunes and plains. It flowers from April to November. The opposite leaves are 1 to 10 cm long and about 1 to 2 cm wide, covered with dendritic hairs, and having smooth edges The stem cross-section is roughly circular. The flower has five stamens and a five-lobed calyx, with a corolla which is white or cream.

In Western Australia it is found in the IBRA regions of Little Sandy Desert, Gascoyne, Central Ranges, Gibson Desert, Great Sandy Desert, Tanami, Great Victoria Desert, and Murchison.

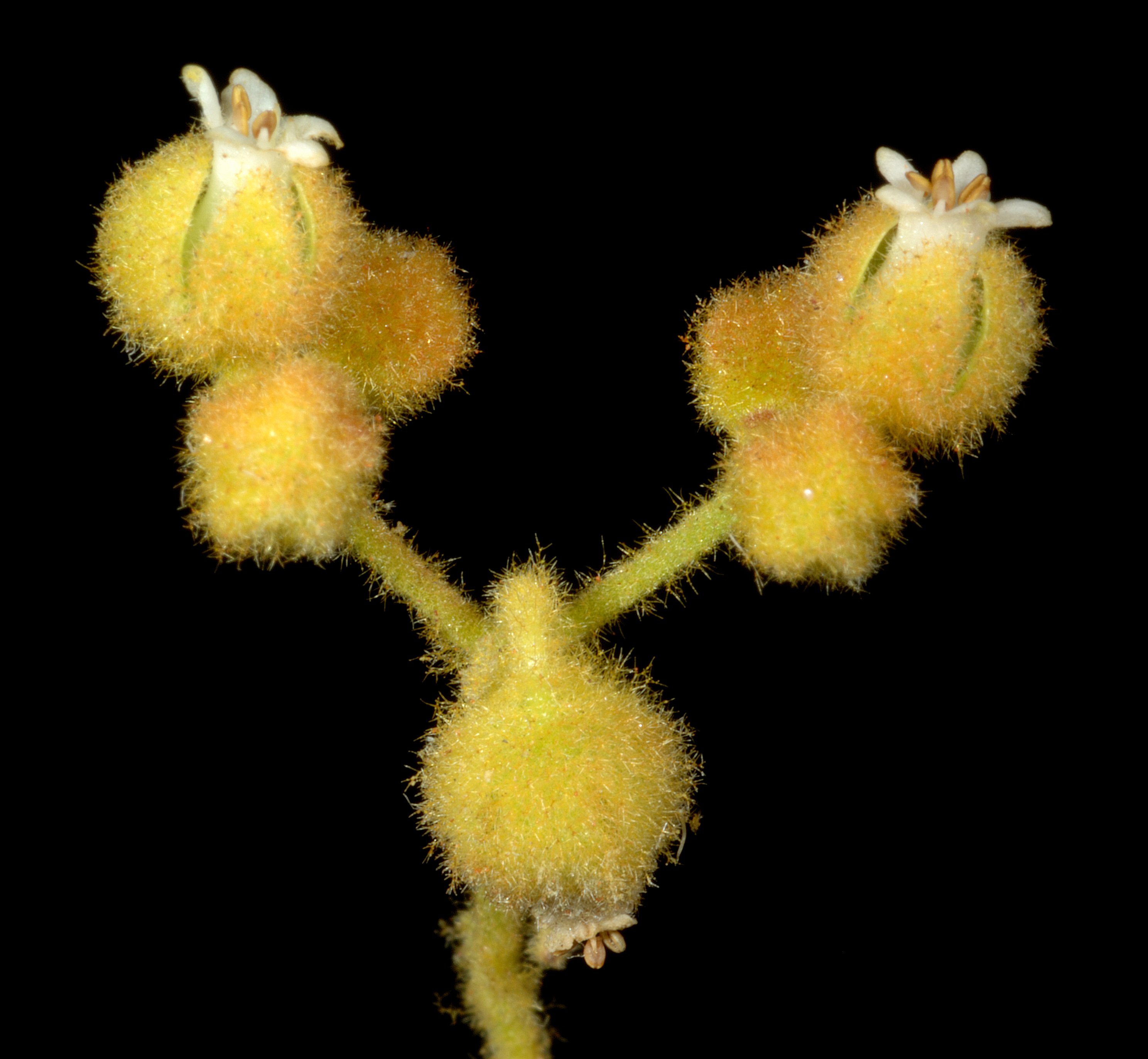

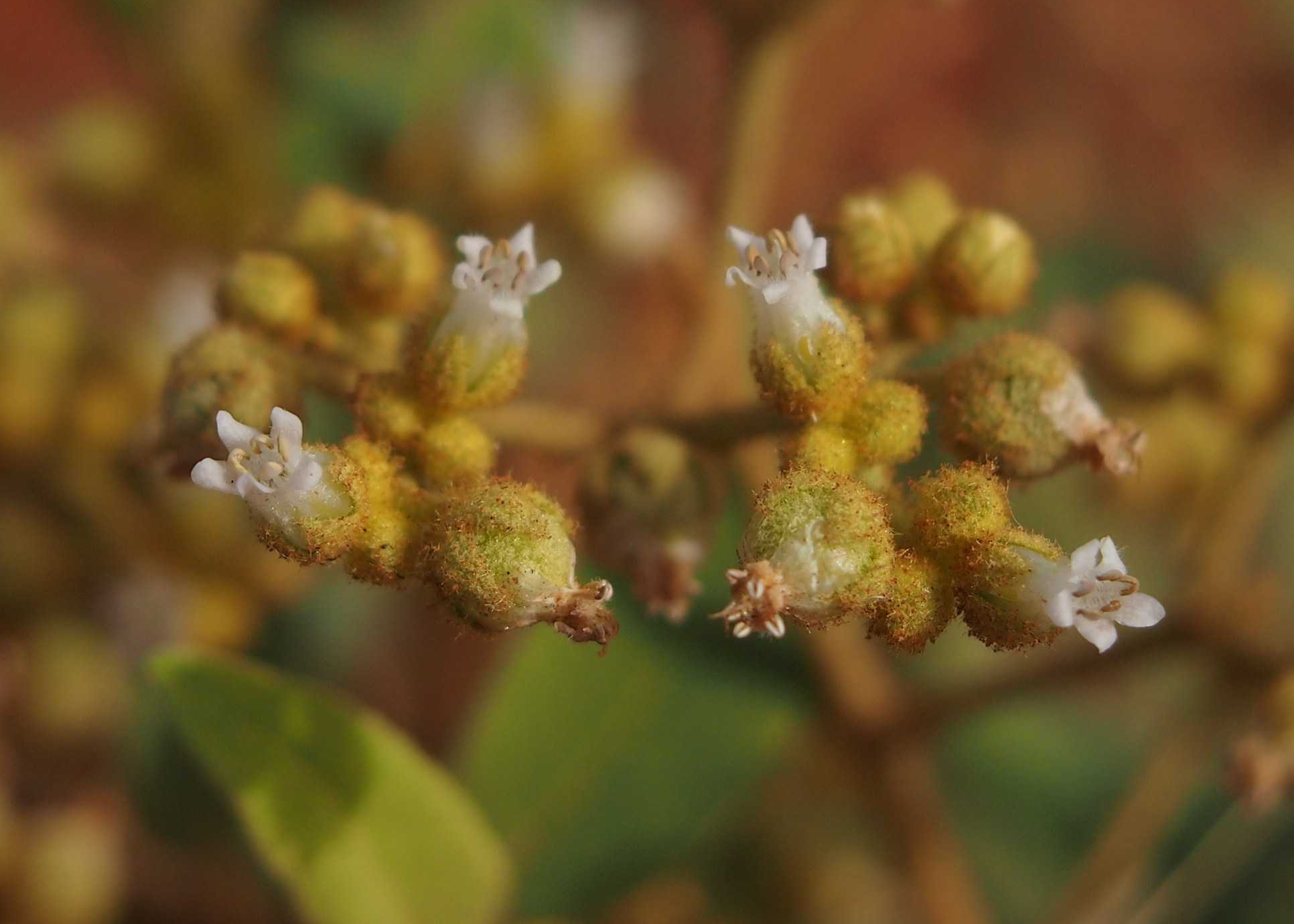

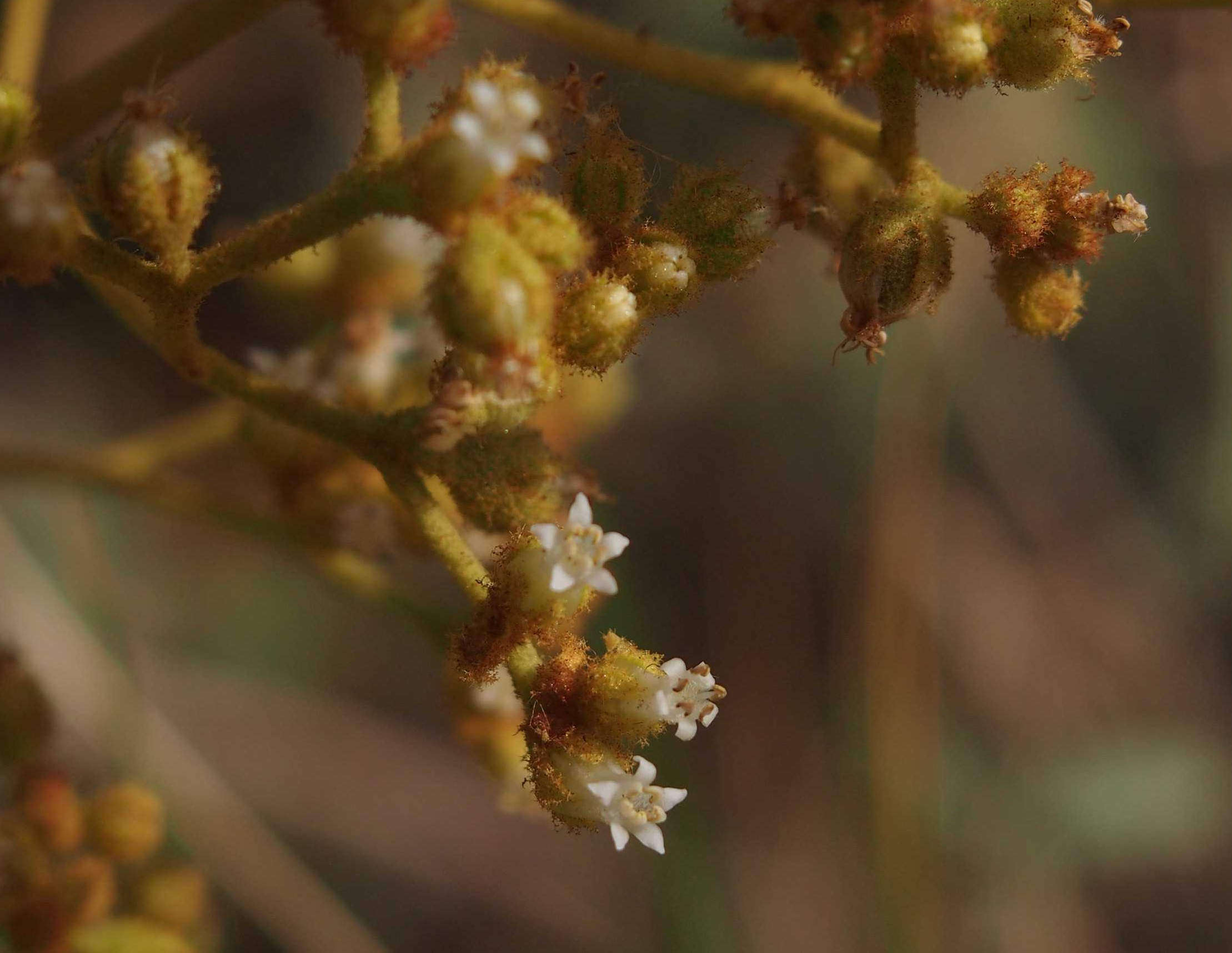

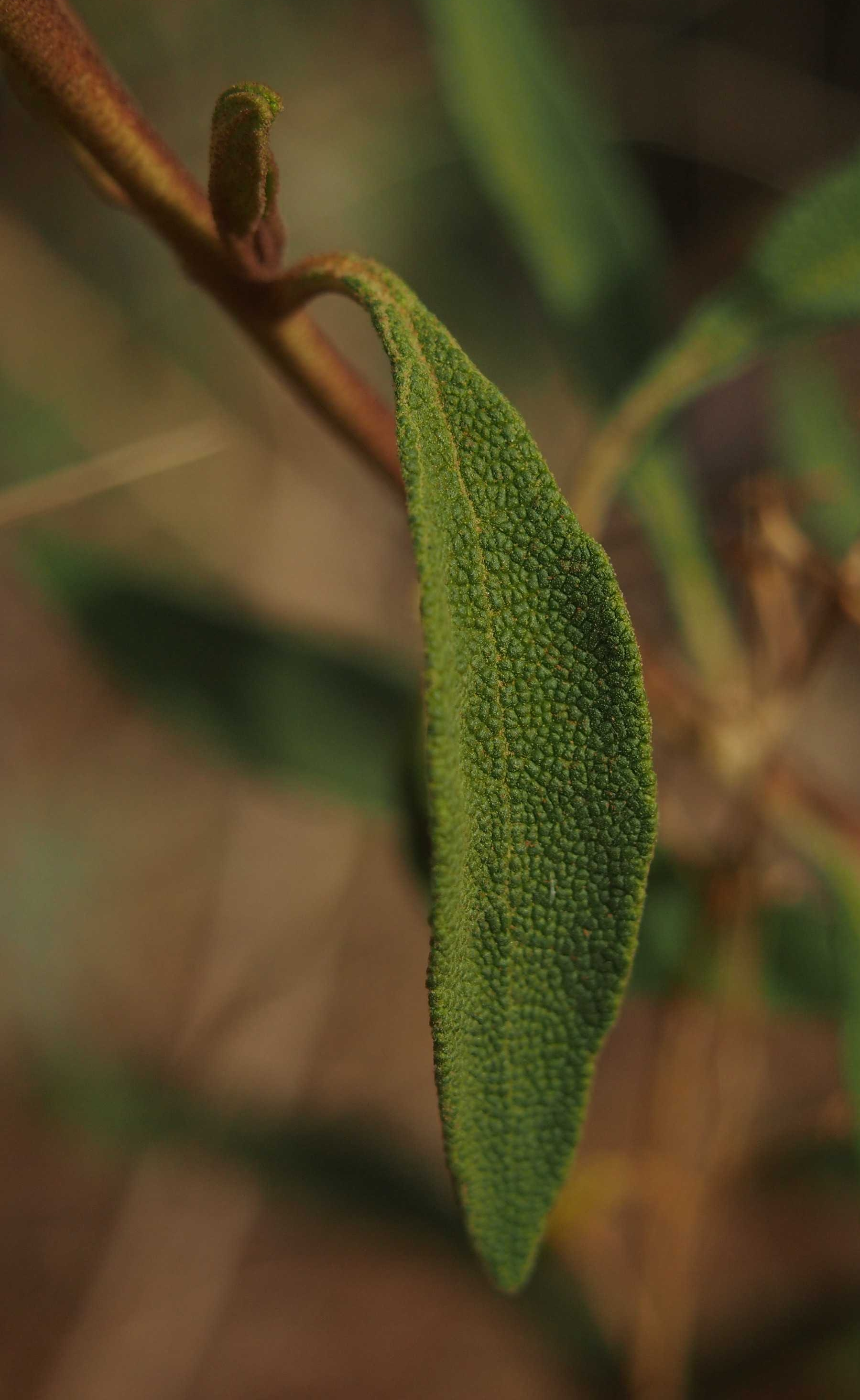

== Taxonomy ==
It was first described by Mueller in 1858 as Pityrodia exsuccosa, and in 1917, was placed in the genus Dicrastylis by Druce.
