= Dicrastylis incana =

Conservation status
- Priority Two — Poorly Known Taxa (DEC)

Scientific classification
- Kingdom: Plantae
- Clade: Tracheophytes
- Clade: Angiosperms
- Clade: Eudicots
- Clade: Asterids
- Order: Lamiales
- Family: Lamiaceae
- Genus: Dicrastylis
- Species: D. incana

Binomial name
- Dicrastylis incana Munir
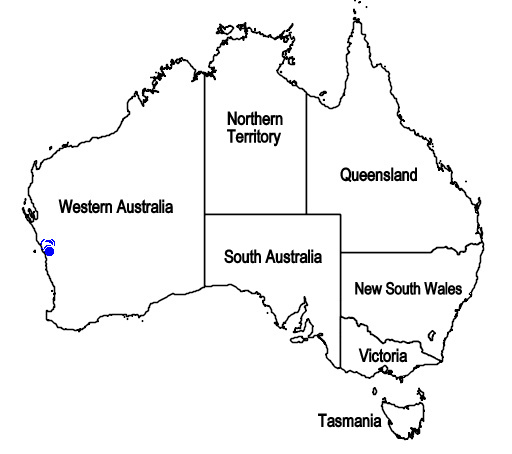

Synonyms
- Dicrastylis morrisonii Munir

Species of flowering plant

Dicrastylis incana is a species of plant within the genus, Dicrastylis, in the family Lamiaceae. It is endemic to Western Australia.

== Description ==
Dicrastylis incana is a spreading shrub, growing from 30 cm to 1.5 m high, on yellow sands, in open woodlands. Its stems are roughly circular in cross section. The opposite and entire leaves are 10–24 mm long by 1.5–7 mm wide, and have branched (dendritic) hairs. There are no bracteoles, but there are bracts which are 3 to 5 mm long. The flower stalks are 2–4 mm long, and have dendritic hairs, and peltate scale hairs. The calyx has five lobes (1.5–2 mm long), and is covered in dendritic hairs, and the white to cream corolla is 5–8 mm long, with no dots or stripes in its throat. There are five stamens. Flowers may be seen from September to November.

It is found in Beard's South West Province.

== Taxonomy ==
It was first described by Ahmad Abid Munir in 1978 as Dicrastylis incana.
