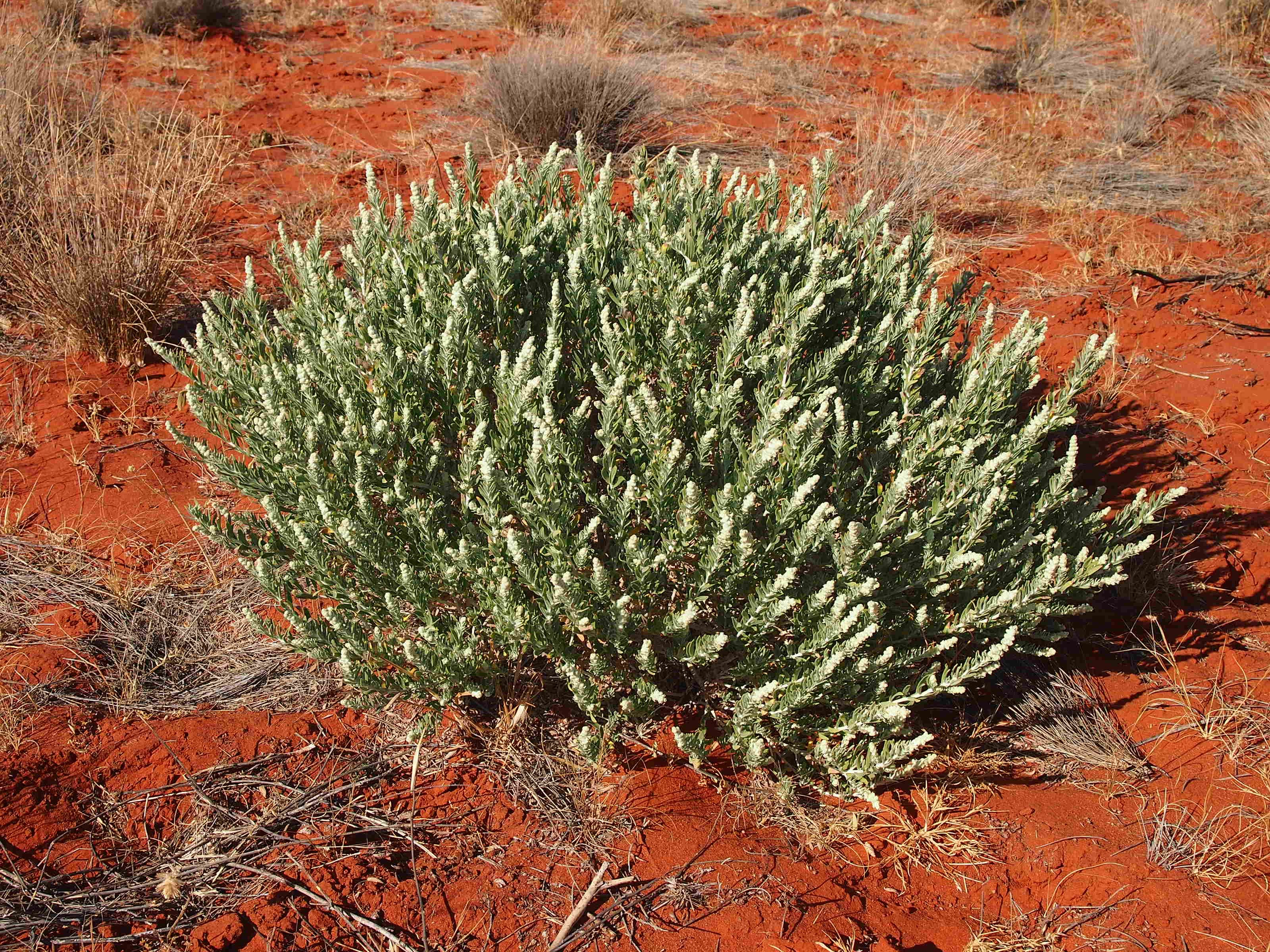
- Dicrastylis costelloi

Scientific classification
- Kingdom: Plantae
- Clade: Tracheophytes
- Clade: Angiosperms
- Clade: Eudicots
- Clade: Asterids
- Order: Lamiales
- Family: Lamiaceae
- Subfamily: Prostantheroideae
- Genus: Dicrastylis; Drumm. ex Harv.
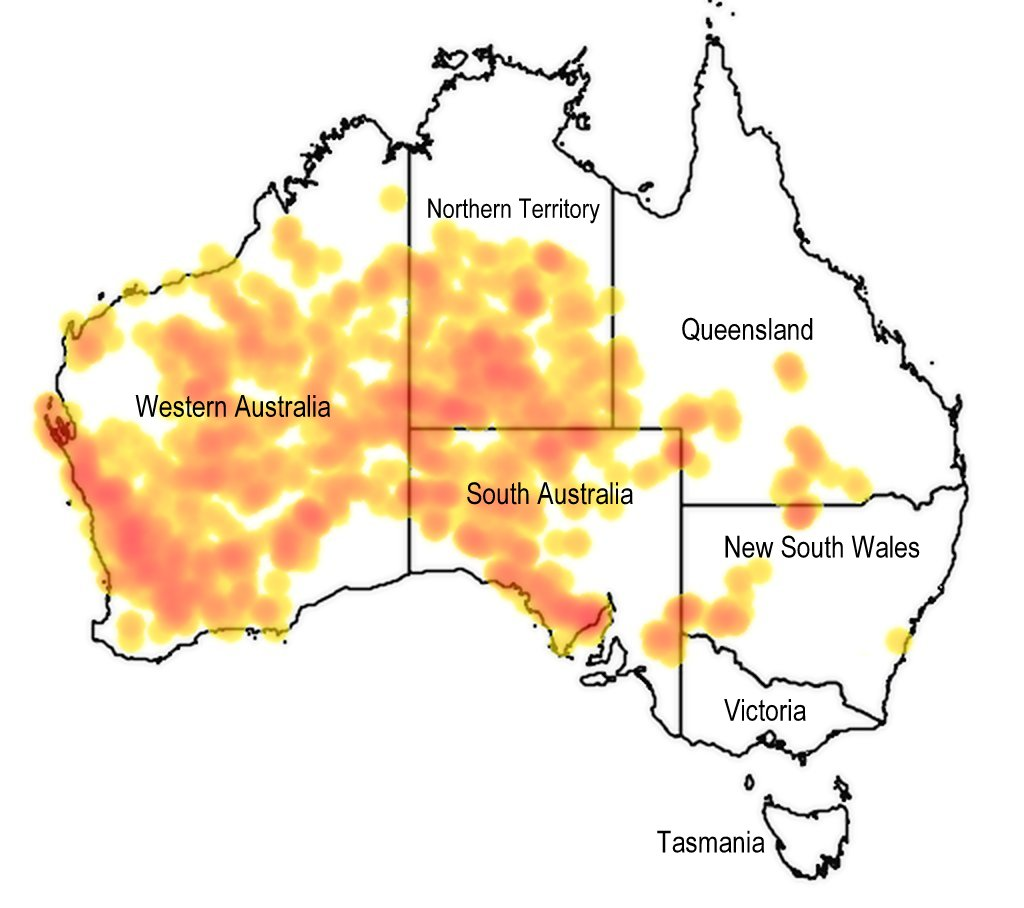

Synonyms
- Mallophora Endl.; Lachnocephalus Turcz.; Dicrastyles Benth.

= Dicrastylis =

Genus of flowering plants

Dicrastylis is a genus of plants in the Lamiaceae, first described in 1855. The entire genus is endemic to Australia. The type species is Dicrastylis fulva.

== Description ==
The fruit is a non-fleshy; indehiscent, 4-celled nut, with each cell having 1-2 seeds. The calyx is five-lobed and woolly outside.

== Species ==
- Dicrastylis archeri Munir - Western Australia
- Dicrastylis beveridgei F.Muell. - Western Australia, South Australia, Northern Territory
- Dicrastylis brunnea Munir - Western Australia
- Dicrastylis capitellata Munir - Western Australia
- Dicrastylis cordifolia Munir - Western Australia
- Dicrastylis corymbosa (Endl.) Munir - Western Australia
- Dicrastylis costelloi F.M.Bailey - Western Australia, South Australia, Northern Territory
- Dicrastylis cundeeleensis Rye - Western Australia
- Dicrastylis doranii F.Muell. - Western Australia, South Australia, Northern Territory
- Dicrastylis exsuccosa (F.Muell.) Druce - Western Australia, South Australia, Northern Territory
- Dicrastylis flexuosa (M.P.Price) C.A.Gardner - Western Australia
- Dicrastylis fulva Drumm. ex Harv. - Western Australia
- Dicrastylis gilesii F.Muell - Western Australia, Northern Territory
- Dicrastylis globiflora (Endl.) Rye - Western Australia
- Dicrastylis incana Munir - Western Australia
- Dicrastylis kumarinensis Rye - Western Australia
- Dicrastylis lewellinii (F.Muell.) F.Muell - South Australia, Northern Territory, Queensland, New South Wales
- Dicrastylis linearifolia Munir - Western Australia
- Dicrastylis maritima Rye & Trudgen - Western Australia
- Dicrastylis micrantha Munir - Western Australia
- Dicrastylis mitchellii Rye - Western Australia
- Dicrastylis nicholasii F.Muell. - Western Australia
- Dicrastylis obovata Munir - Western Australia
- Dicrastylis parvifolia F.Muell - Western Australia
- Dicrastylis reticulata Drumm. ex Harv. - Western Australia
- Dicrastylis rugosifolia (Munir) Rye - Western Australia
- Dicrastylis sessilifolia Munir - Western Australia
- Dicrastylis soliparma Rye & Trudgen - Western Australia
- Dicrastylis subterminalis Rye - Western Australia
- Dicrastylis velutina Munir - Western Australia
- Dicrastylis verticillata J.M.Black - South Australia*

(According to the Plants of the World online)

== See also ==
- B.L. Rye (2007). "A review of the sectional classification of Dicrastylis (Lamiaceae: Chloantheae) and four new arid-zone species from Western Australia" (PDF). Nuytsia. 17: 289–324. doi:10.58828/NUY00484. ISSN 0085-4417. Wikidata Q100730354. Archived from the original (PDF) on 9 August 2017.
- B.L. Rye (2005). "A taxonomic review of Dicrastylis sect. Corymbosae (Lamiaceae: Chloantheae), incorporating Mallophora as a new synonym" (PDF). Nuytsia. 15 (3): 445–456. doi:10.58828/NUY00438. ISSN 0085-4417. Wikidata Q100730229. Archived from the original (PDF) on 11 August 2017.
- B.L.Rye; M.E. Trudgen (1998). "A taxonomic revision of Dicrastylis sect. Dicrastylis (Lamiaceae subfamily Chloanthoideae)". Nuytsia. 12 (2): 207–228. doi:10.58828/NUY00297. ISSN 0085-4417. Wikidata Q100730010.
