= Dicrastylis capitellata =

Conservation status
- Priority One — Poorly Known Taxa (DEC)

Scientific classification
- Kingdom: Plantae
- Clade: Tracheophytes
- Clade: Angiosperms
- Clade: Eudicots
- Clade: Asterids
- Order: Lamiales
- Family: Lamiaceae
- Genus: Dicrastylis
- Species: D. capitellata

Binomial name
- Dicrastylis capitellata Munir
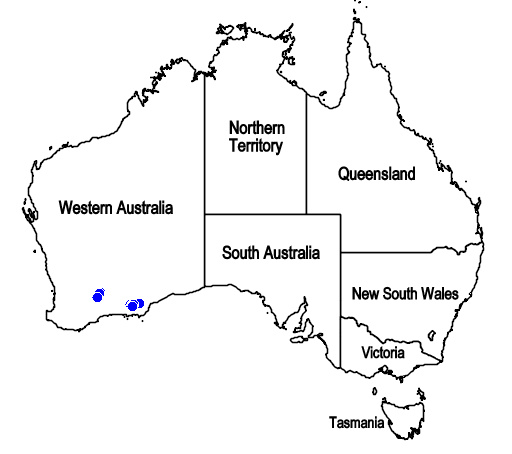

Species of flowering plant

Dicrastylis capitellata is a species of plant within the genus, Dicrastylis, in the family Lamiaceae. It is endemic to the south of Western Australia.

== Description ==
Dicrastylis capitellata is a low spreading shrub, growing from 20 cm to 25 cm high, in sandy loams. Its stems are roughly circular in cross section. The opposite and entire leaves are 7–25 mm long by 0.5-2.5 mm wide, and have branched (dendritic) hairs, and a blistered, puckered surface. There are no bracteoles, but there are bracts which are 2–3. mm long. The flowers are sessile. The calyx has five lobes (1.2–2 mm long), and is covered in dendritic hairs, and the blue corolla is 4–5 mm long, with no dots or stripes in its throat. There are five stamens. Flowers may be seen in May.

It is found in the IBRA region of Mallee.

== Taxonomy ==
It was first described by Ahmad Abid Munir in 1978 as Dicrastylis capitellata, from a specimen collected by W.R. Archer. There are no synonyms.
