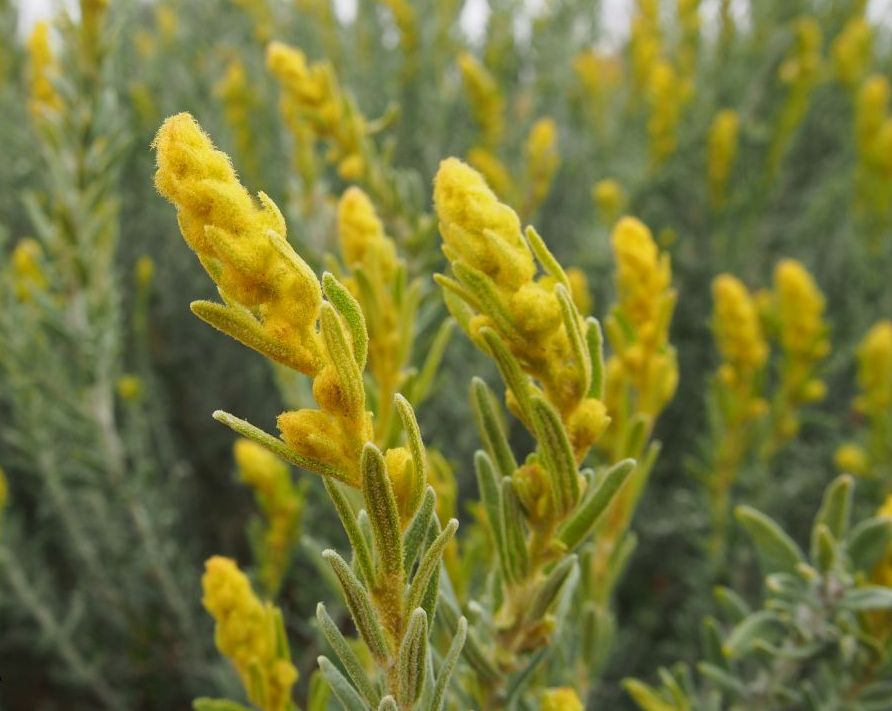

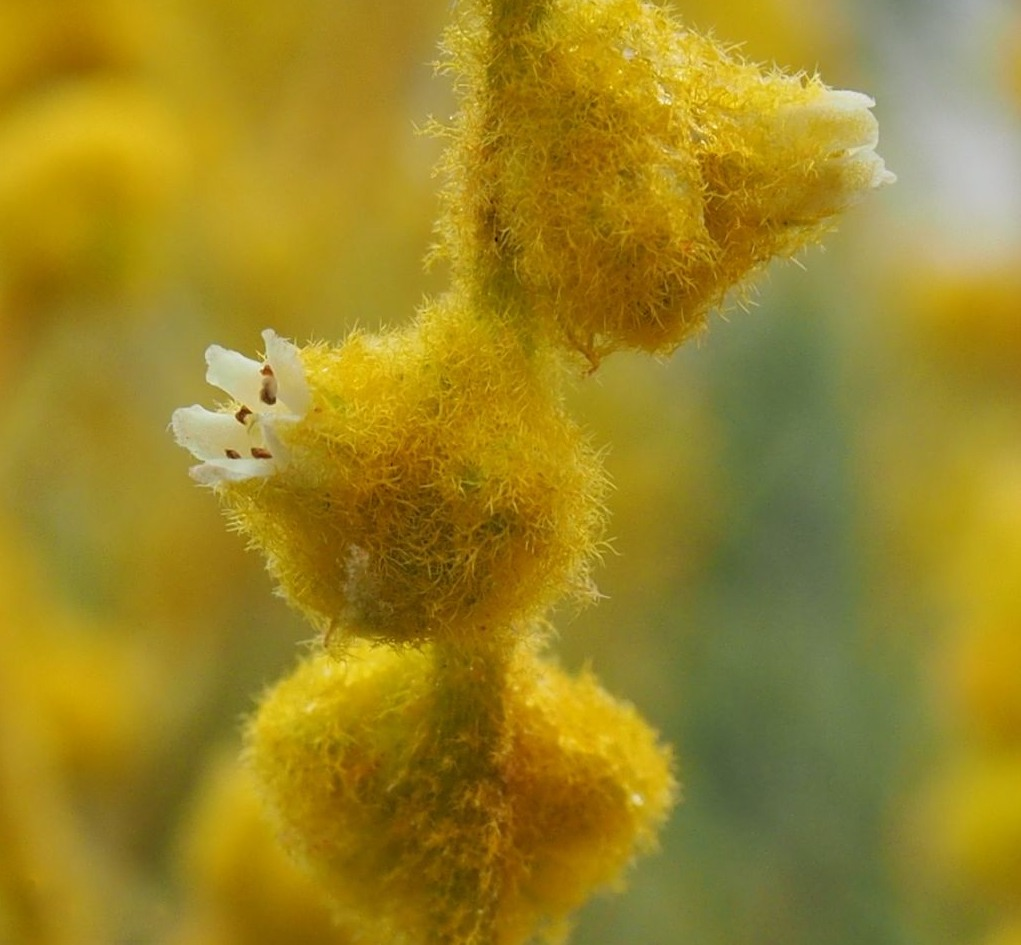

Scientific classification
- Kingdom: Plantae
- Clade: Tracheophytes
- Clade: Angiosperms
- Clade: Eudicots
- Clade: Asterids
- Order: Lamiales
- Family: Lamiaceae
- Genus: Dicrastylis
- Species: D. beveridgei

Binomial name
- Dicrastylis beveridgei F.Muell.
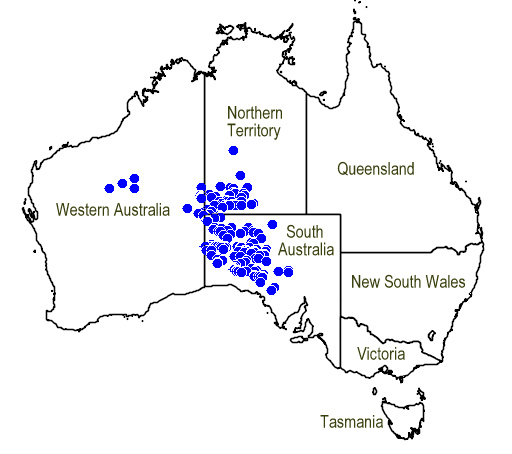

Synonyms
- Dicrastylis beveridgei var. lanata Munir; Dicrastylis beveridgei subsp. revoluta Munir

= Dicrastylis beveridgei =

Species of flowering plant

Dicrastylis beveridgei is a species of plant within the genus, Dicrastylis, in the family Lamiaceae. It is found in Western Australia, the Northern Territory, and South Australia.

== Description ==
Dicrastylis beveridgei is a shrub, growing to 1 m high, in red sand, on sand dunes. Its stems are roughly circular in cross section. The opposite and entire leaves are 10–22 mm long by 2.5–5 mm wide, and have branched (dendritic) hairs, and a blistered, puckered surface. There are no bracteoles, but there are bracts which are 2.2-2.5. mm. The flowers are sessile. The calyx has five lobes (0.8-1.2 mm long), which are covered in dendritic hairs, and the yellow and white corolla is 3–4 mm long, with no dots or stripes in its throat. There are five stamens. Flowers may be seen from January to December.

It is found in the IBRA regions of Central Ranges, Gibson Desert, Great Sandy Desert, and Little Sandy Desert.

== Taxonomy ==
It was first described by Ferdinand von Mueller in 1873 as Dicrastylis beveridgei. There are no synonyms.
