= Dicrastylis linearifolia =

Conservation status
- Priority Three — Poorly Known Taxa (DEC)

Scientific classification
- Kingdom: Plantae
- Clade: Tracheophytes
- Clade: Angiosperms
- Clade: Eudicots
- Clade: Asterids
- Order: Lamiales
- Family: Lamiaceae
- Genus: Dicrastylis
- Species: D. linearifolia

Binomial name
- Dicrastylis linearifolia Munir
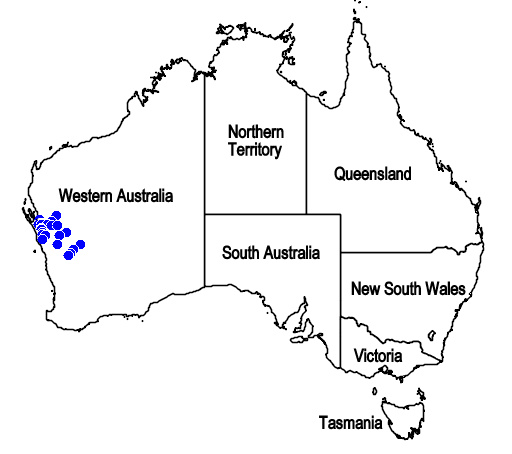

Species of flowering plant

Dicrastylis linearifolia is a species of plant within the genus, Dicrastylis, in the family Lamiaceae. It is endemic to Western Australia.

== Description ==
Dicrastylis linearifolia is a many branched shrub, growing from 1 m to 3 m high, on red sands, on sandplains. Its stems are roughly circular in cross section, and have no peltate scales. The opposite and entire leaves are 15–40 mm long by 2–6 mm wide, whose upper surfaces have branched (dendritic) hairs. There are no bracteoles, but there are bracts which are 0.7-1. mm long. The flower stalks are 2.5-3.5 mm long, and have dendritic hairs, and peltate scale hairs. The calyx has five lobes (1-1.7 mm long), and is covered in dendritic hairs, and the white to cream corolla is 4.5-6.5 mm long, with no dots or stripes in its throat. There are five stamens. Flowers may be seen from November to December.

It is found in Beard's Eremaean and South-West Provinces.

== Taxonomy ==
It was first described by Ahmad Abid Munir in 1978 as Dicrastylis linearifolia. There are no synonyms.
