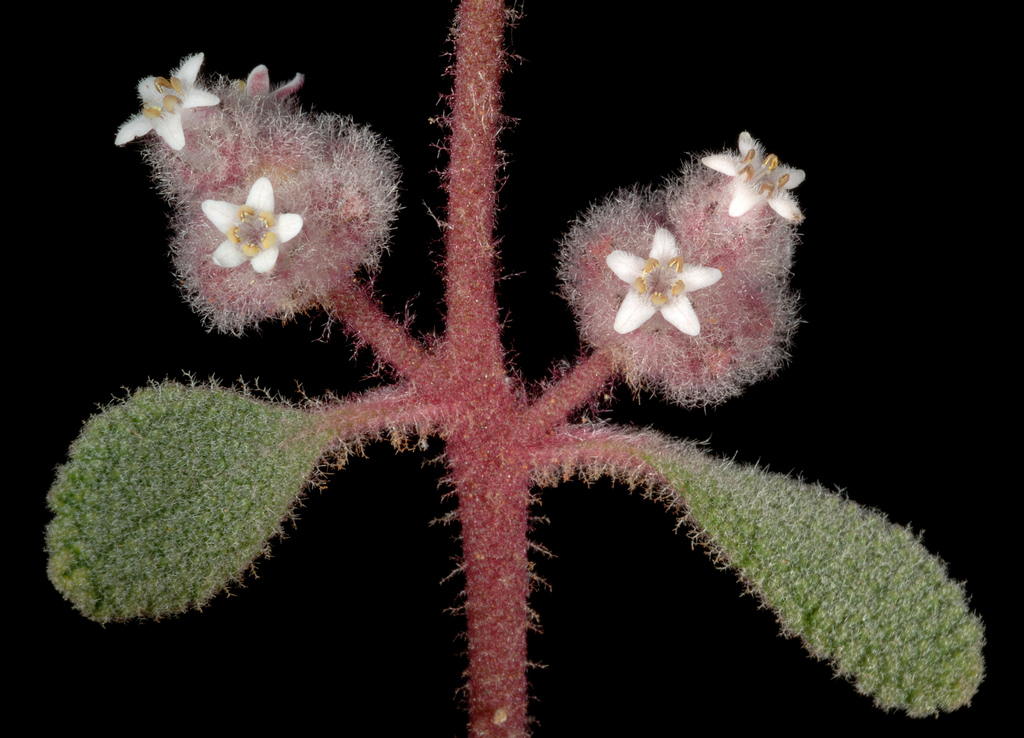

Scientific classification
- Kingdom: Plantae
- Clade: Tracheophytes
- Clade: Angiosperms
- Clade: Eudicots
- Clade: Asterids
- Order: Lamiales
- Family: Lamiaceae
- Genus: Dicrastylis
- Species: D. cordifolia

Binomial name
- Dicrastylis cordifolia Munir
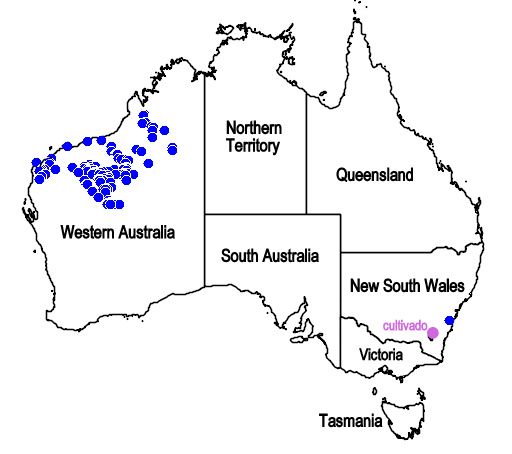

Synonyms
- Dicrastylis cordifolia var. barnettii Munir; Dicrastylis cordifolia var. purpurea Munir; Dicrastylis georgei Munir; Dicrastylis georgei var. cuneata Munir

= Dicrastylis cordifolia =

Species of flowering plant

Dicrastylis cordifolia is a species of plant within the genus, Dicrastylis, in the family Lamiaceae. It is endemic to the north of Western Australia.

== Description ==
Dicrastylis cordifolia is a spreading shrub, growing to 1 m high, in red sands or red stony loams, on sand dunes, plains and ridges. Its stems are roughly circular in cross section. The opposite and entire leaves are 12–30 mm long by 5–20 mm wide, and have branched (dendritic) hairs, and a blistered, puckered surface. There are no bracteoles, but there are bracts which are 1.5-2.3 mm long. The flower stalks are 0.5-0.7 mm long, and have dendritic hairs, and peltate scales hairs. The calyx has five lobes (1.5–3 mm long), and is covered in dendritic hairs, and the white to cream corolla is 5–8 mm long, with no dots or stripes in its throat. There are five stamens. Flowers may be seen from March to September (or March or May).

It is found in Beard's Eremaean and Northern Provinces.

== Taxonomy ==
It was first described by Ahmad Abid Munir in 1978 as Dicrastylis cordifolia.
