= Dicrastylis archeri =

Conservation status
- Priority One — Poorly Known Taxa (DEC)

Scientific classification
- Kingdom: Plantae
- Clade: Tracheophytes
- Clade: Angiosperms
- Clade: Eudicots
- Clade: Asterids
- Order: Lamiales
- Family: Lamiaceae
- Genus: Dicrastylis
- Species: D. archeri

Binomial name
- Dicrastylis archeri Munir
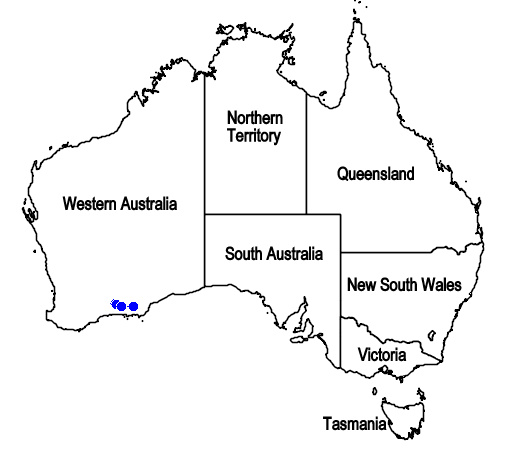

Species of flowering plant

Dicrastylis archeri is a species of plant within the genus, Dicrastylis, in the family Lamiaceae. It is endemic to the south-west of Western Australia.

== Description ==
Dicrastylis archeri is an erect, spindly shrub, growing from 40 cm up to 1 m high. Its stems are roughly circular in cross section. The opposite and entire leaves are 20–50 mm long by 3–5 mm wide, and have branched (dendritic) hairs, and a blistered, puckered surface. There are no bracteoles, but there are bracts which are 3.5-5. mm long. The stalks of the flowers are 2.5–5 mm long, and have both simple hairs and peltate scales. The calyx has five lobes (1-1.5 mm long), and are covered in dendritic hairs. and the white or cream corolla is 4-4.5 mm long, with no dots or stripes in its throat. There are four (five) stamens. Flowers may be seen in November or December.

It is found in the IBRA region of Mallee.

== Taxonomy ==
It was first described by Ahmad Abid Munir in 1978 as Dicrastylis archeri. There are no synonyms.
