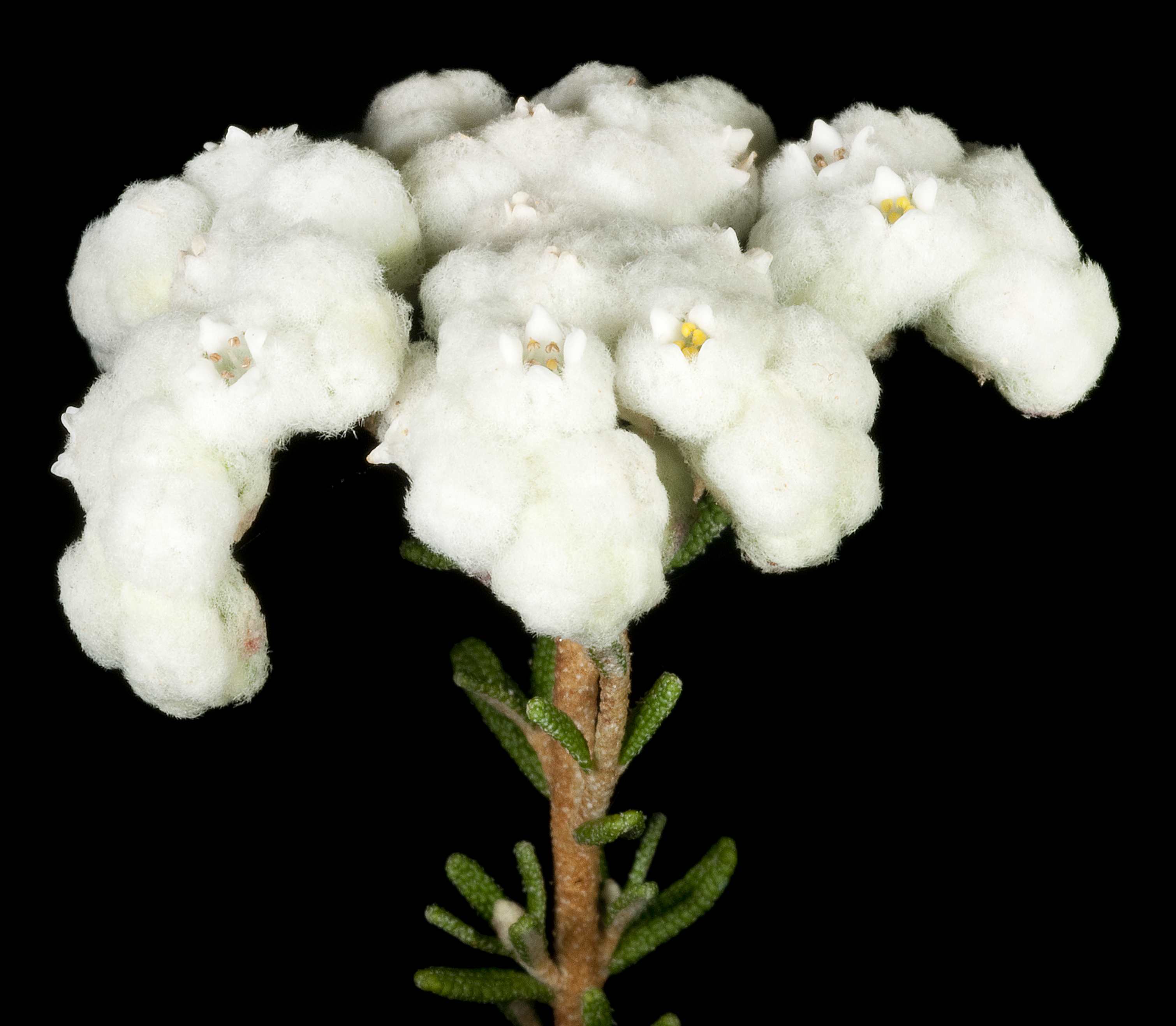
- Dicrastylis rugosifolia

Scientific classification
- Kingdom: Plantae
- Clade: Tracheophytes
- Clade: Angiosperms
- Clade: Eudicots
- Clade: Asterids
- Order: Lamiales
- Family: Lamiaceae
- Genus: Dicrastylis
- Species: D. rugosifolia

Binomial name
- Dicrastylis rugosifolia (Munir) Rye
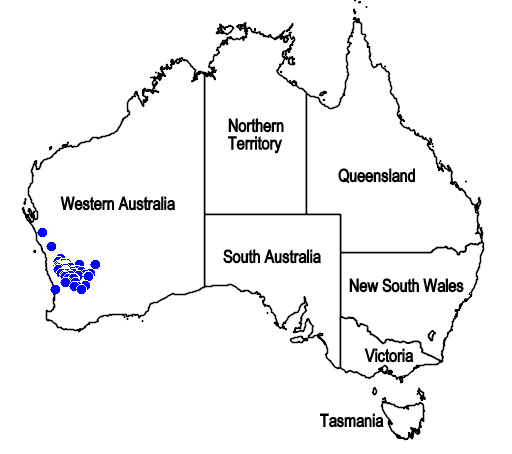
- Occurrence data from AVH

Synonyms
- Mallophora rugosifolia Munir

= Dicrastylis rugosifolia =

Species of plant

Dicrastylis rugosifolia is a species of plant within the genus, Dicrastylis, in the family Lamiaceae. It is endemic to the south-west of Western Australia.

== Description ==
Dicrastylis rugosifolia is a dense sprawling shrub, growing to 35 cm high. Its stems are roughly circular in cross section. The opposite and entire leaves are 4–7 mm long by 0.8-1.5 mm wide, and have branched (dendritic) hairs, and a blistered, puckered surface. There are no bracteoles, but there are bracts which are 1.5-4. mm long. The flowers are sessile. The calyx has five lobes (1.7–2 mm long), covered in dendritic hairs, and the white or cream corolla is 3–4 mm long, with no dots or stripes in its throat. There are five stamens. Flowers may be seen from August to December.

It is found in the IBRA regions of Avon Wheatbelt, Coolgardie, and the Geraldton Sandplains.

== Taxonomy ==
It was first described by Ahmad Abid Munir in 1977 as Mallophora rugosifolia, but was redescribed by Barbara Lynette Rye in 2005 as Dicrastylis rugosifolia.
