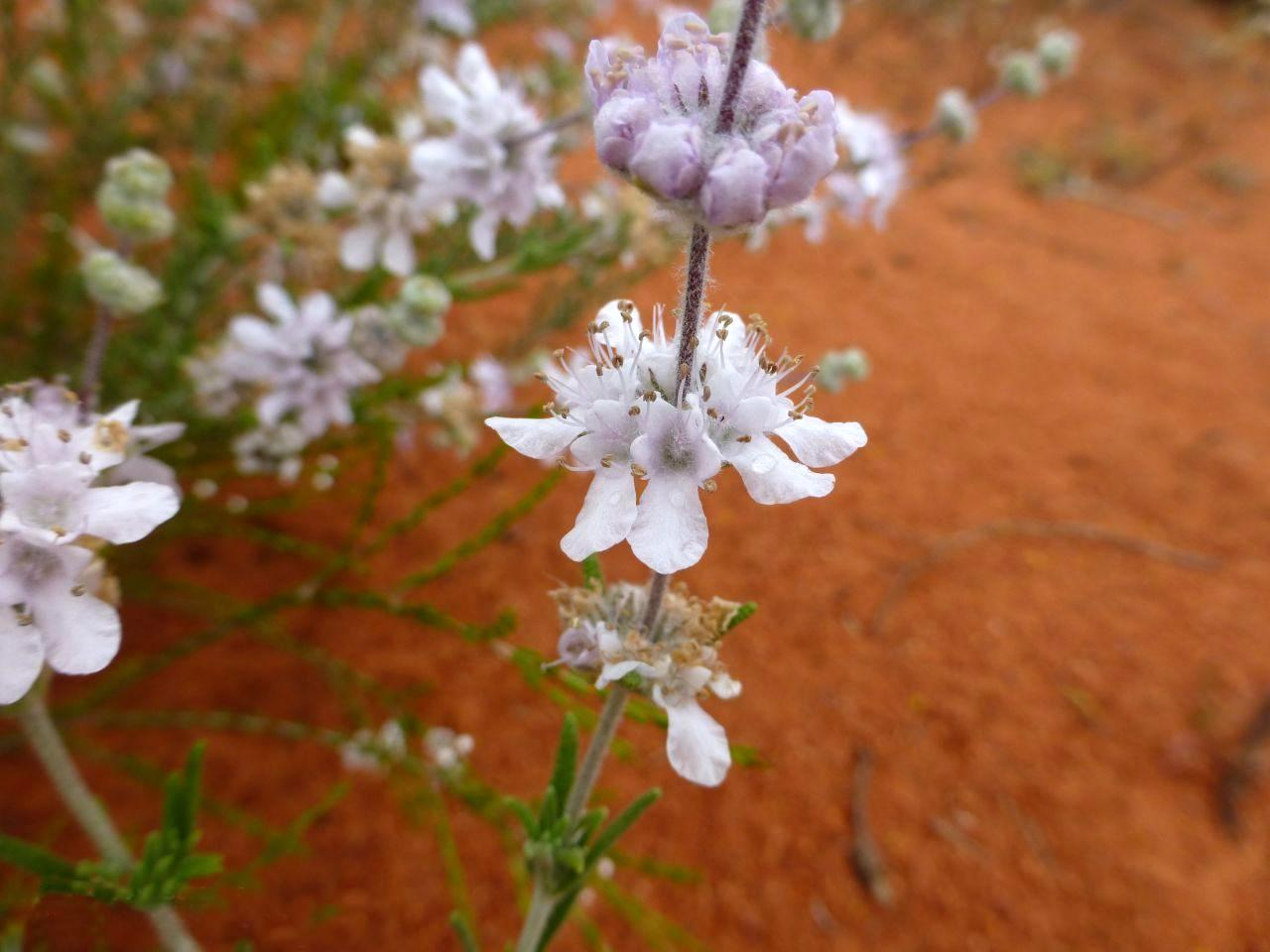

Scientific classification
- Kingdom: Plantae
- Clade: Tracheophytes
- Clade: Angiosperms
- Clade: Eudicots
- Clade: Asterids
- Order: Lamiales
- Family: Lamiaceae
- Genus: Dicrastylis
- Species: D. verticillata

Binomial name
- Dicrastylis verticillata J.M.Black
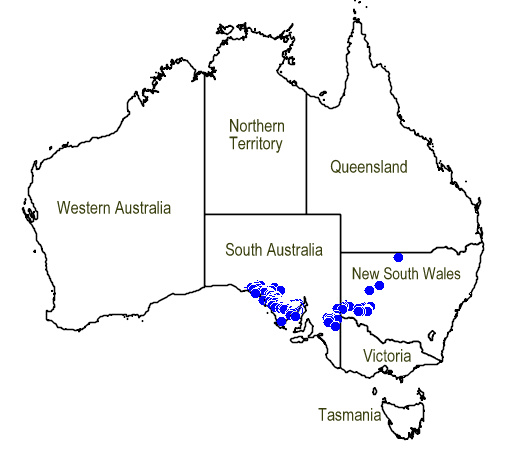

= Dicrastylis verticillata =

Species of flowering plant

Dicrastylis verticillata is a species of plant within the genus, Dicrastylis, in the family Lamiaceae. It is found in both South Australia and New South Wales.

== Description ==
Dicrastylis verticillata is a spreading shrub, growing from 25 cm to 65 cm high, on sandy soils, on sandplains and road verges. Its stems are roughly circular in cross section, covered with dense white intertwined hairs. The sessile, opposite and entire leaves are 7–22 mm long by 2–4 mm wide, with upper surfaces which are wrinkled and pubescent and lower surfaces grey (covered in dense intertwined hairs). The inflorescences are terminal. The bracts are 4–8 mm long. The flower stalks are 2–4.5 mm long, and have both dendritic and peltate scale hairs. The calyx has five lobes (3–4 mm long)which are free almost to their bases. The white or pale mauve corolla is 5–7 mm long. There are five exserted stamens. It generally flowers in spring and summer.

== Taxonomy ==
It was first described by John McConnell Black in 1918 as Dicrastylis verticillata. There are no synonyms.
