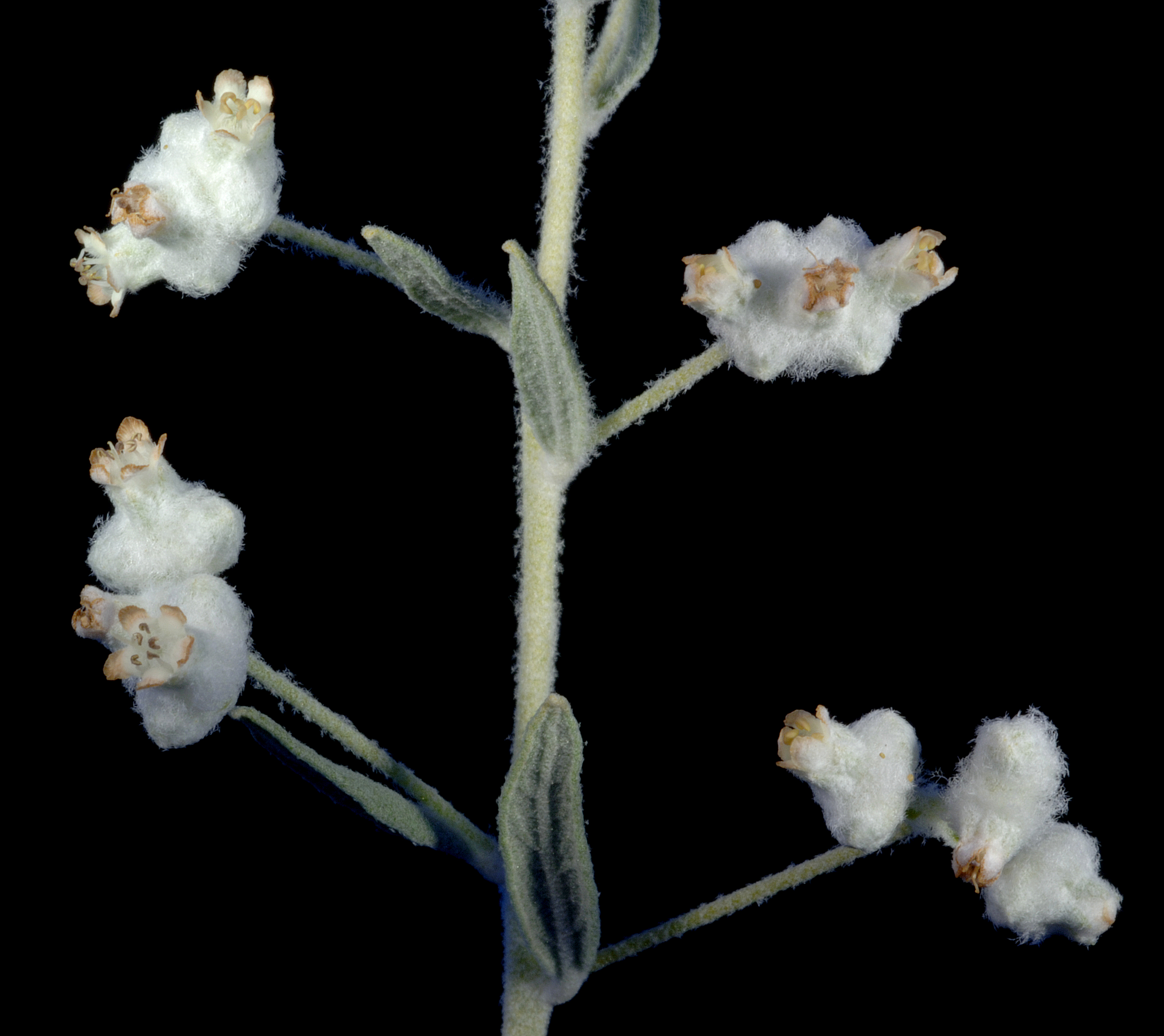

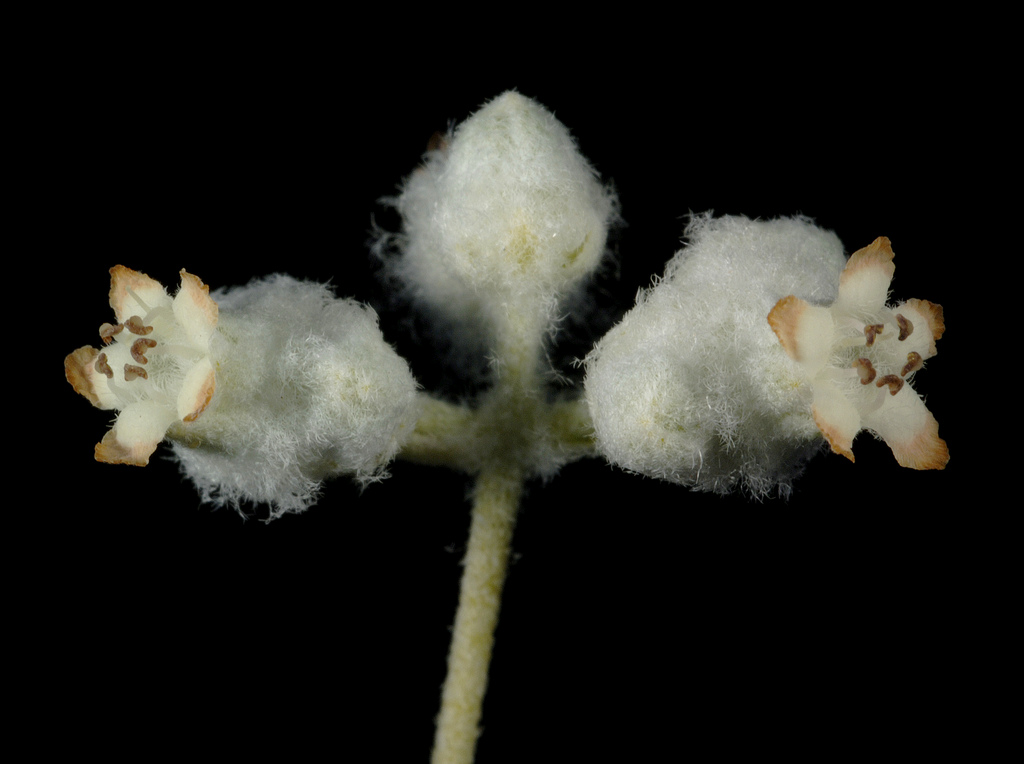

Scientific classification
- Kingdom: Plantae
- Clade: Tracheophytes
- Clade: Angiosperms
- Clade: Eudicots
- Clade: Asterids
- Order: Lamiales
- Family: Lamiaceae
- Genus: Dicrastylis
- Species: D. doranii

Binomial name
- Dicrastylis doranii F.Muell.
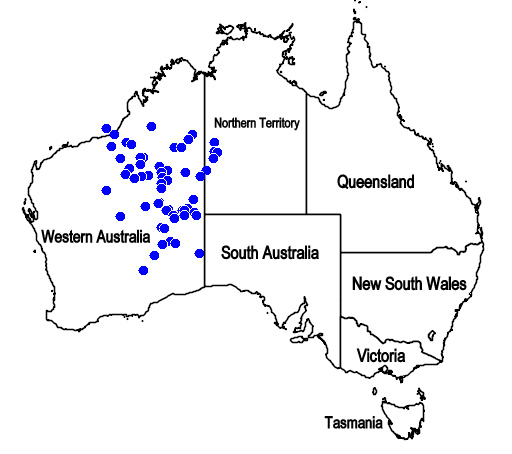

Synonyms
- Dicrastylis carnegiei Hemsl.

= Dicrastylis doranii =

Species of flowering plant

Dicrastylis doranii is a species of plant within the genus, Dicrastylis, in the family Lamiaceae. It is found in Western Australia, the Northern Territory, and South Australia.

== Description ==
Dicrastylis doranii is a spreading shrub, growing from 20 cm up to as high as 1.5 m, on yellow and red sands, on sand dunes and sandplains. Its stems are roughly circular in cross section. The opposite and entire leaves are 10–18 mm long by 1–7 mm wide, and have branched (dendritic) hairs, and a blistered, puckered surface. There are no bracteoles, but there are bracts which are 2–2.5 mm long. The flower stalks are 0.3-0.5 mm long, and have dendritic and peltate scale hairs. The calyx has five lobes (0.6–1 mm long), which are densely covered in dendritic hairs. The white or cream corolla is 4–5 mm long, with no dots or stripes in its throat. There are five stamens. Flowers may be seen from July to December or January.

It is found in Beard's Eremaean and Northern Provinces.

== Taxonomy ==
It was first described by Ferdinand von Mueller in 1873 as Dicrastylis doranii. The specific epithet, doranii, honours Philip Doran, who was curator of the Castlemaine Botanic Gardens for many years.
