= Eremaean province =

Biogeographical region in Western Australia

The Eremaean province is a botanical region in Western Australia, characterised by a desert climate. It is sometimes referred to as the dry and arid inland or interior region of Western Australia It is one of John Stanley Beard's phytogeographic regions of WA, based on climate and types of vegetation who, in "Plant Life of Western Australia" (p. 29-37) gives a short history of the various mappings.

It is the central and largest of Beard's three botanical provinces defined for the state, the others being the Northern province and the Southwest province.

It contains 7 ecoregions that are recognised in the Interim Biogeographic Regionalisation for Australia (IBRA):

- Carnarvon (CAR)
- Central Ranges (CR)
- Coolgardie (COO)
- Gascoyne (GAS)
- Gibson Desert (GD)
- Great Sandy Desert (GSD)
- Great Victoria Desert (GVD)
- Hampton (HAM)
- Little Sandy Desert (LSD)
- Murchison (MUR)
- Nullarbor (NUL)
- Pilbara (PIL)
- Tanami (TAN)
- Yalgoo (YAL)

== See also ==
- IBRA
- Botanical Provinces of Western Australia
