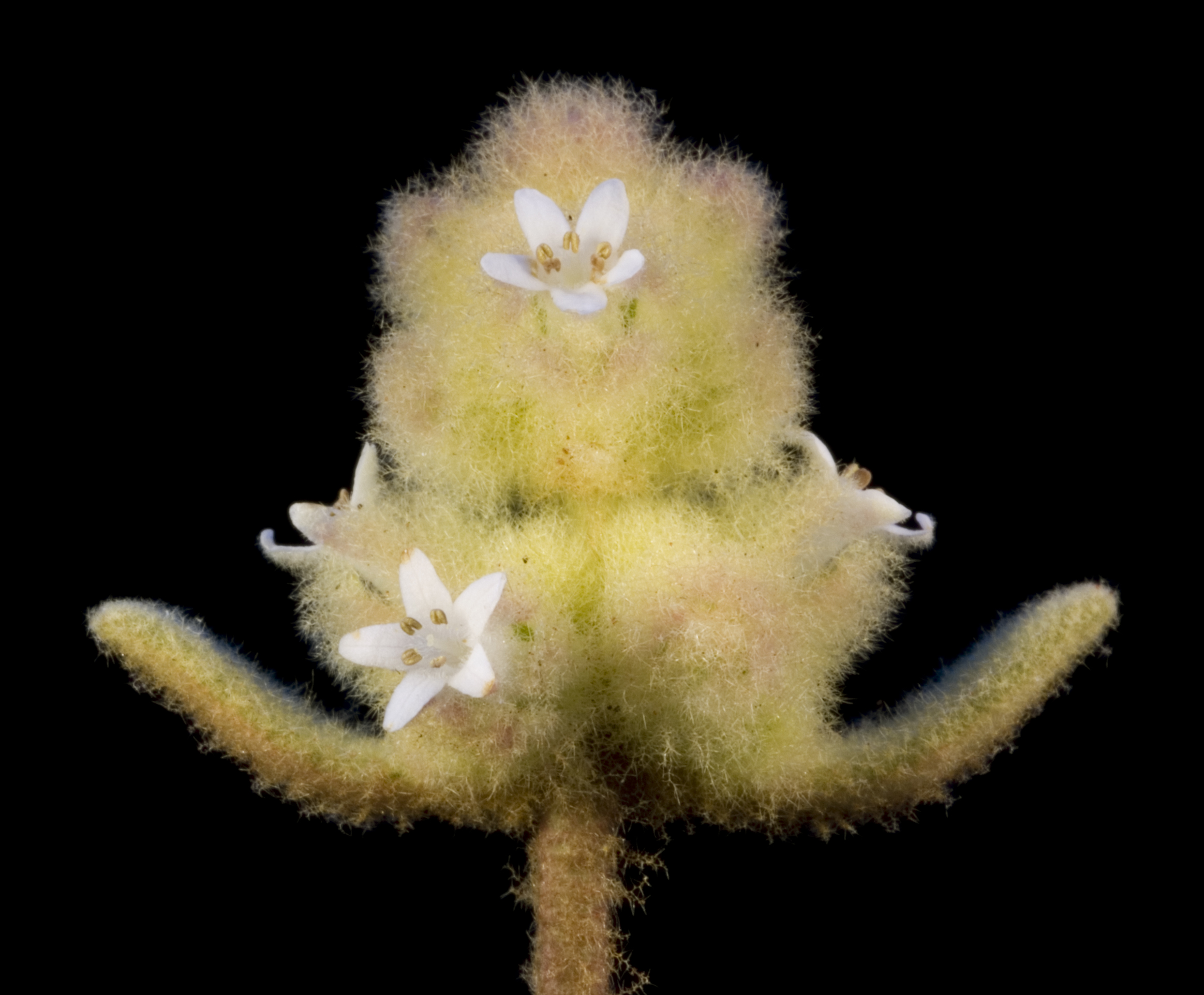

Scientific classification
- Kingdom: Plantae
- Clade: Tracheophytes
- Clade: Angiosperms
- Clade: Eudicots
- Clade: Asterids
- Order: Lamiales
- Family: Lamiaceae
- Genus: Dicrastylis
- Species: D. brunnea

Binomial name
- Dicrastylis brunnea Munir
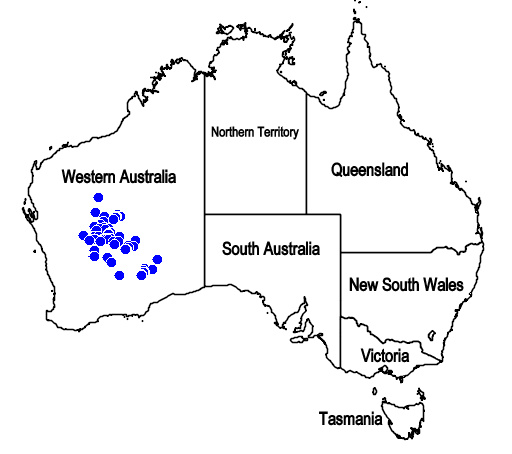

Synonyms
- Dicrastylis brunnea var. pedunculata Munir

= Dicrastylis brunnea =

Species of plant

Dicrastylis brunnea is a species of plant within the genus, Dicrastylis, in the family Lamiaceae. It is endemic to the south-west of Western Australia.

== Description ==
Dicrastylis brunnea is a dense shrub, growing from 20 cm up to as much as 2 m high. Its stems are roughly circular in cross section. The opposite and entire leaves are 10–35 mm long by 5–12 mm, and have branched (dendritic) hairs, and a blistered, puckered surface. There are no bracteoles, but there are bracts which are 3.5–5 mm long. The flowers are sessile. The calyx has five lobes (3.5–4 mm long), covered in dendritic hairs, and the white or cream corolla is 6–8 mm long, with no dots or stripes in its throat. There are five stamens. Flowers may be seen in January, August, September or October.

It is found in the IBRA regions of Coolgardie, Gascoyne, Great Victoria Desert, and Murchison.

== Taxonomy ==
It was first described by Ahmad Abid Munir in 1978 as Dicrastylis brunnea.
