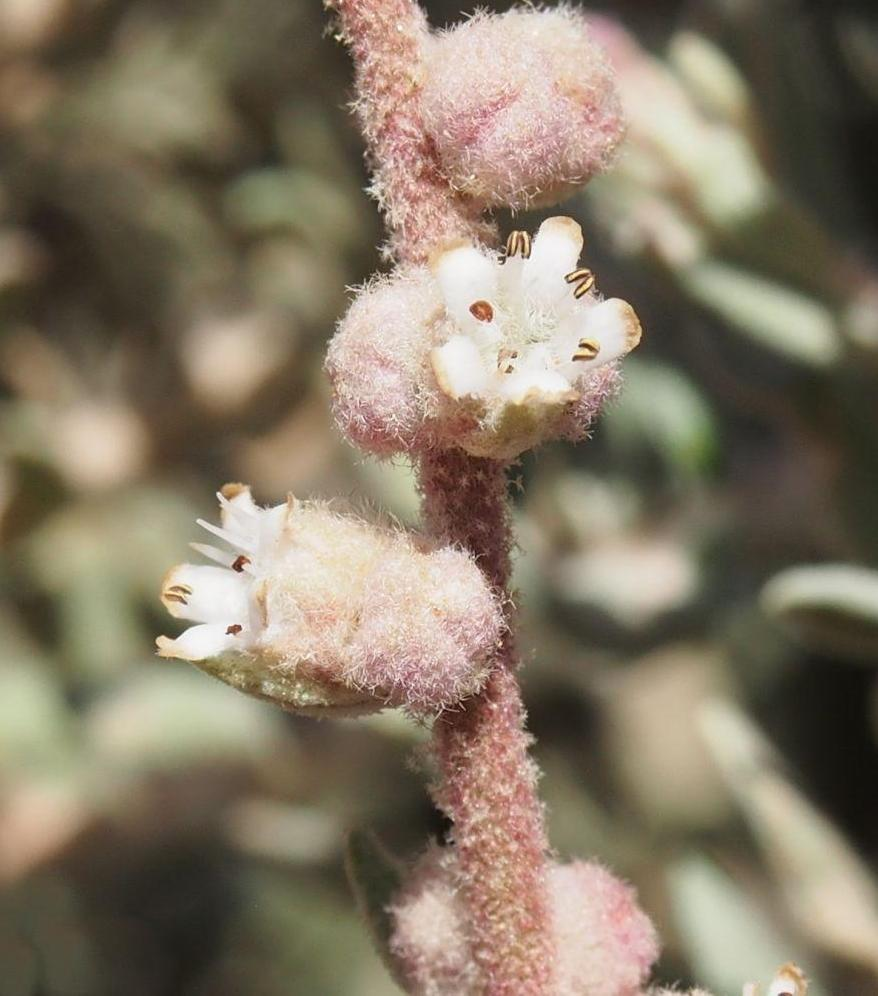

Scientific classification
- Kingdom: Plantae
- Clade: Tracheophytes
- Clade: Angiosperms
- Clade: Eudicots
- Clade: Asterids
- Order: Lamiales
- Family: Lamiaceae
- Genus: Dicrastylis
- Species: D. costelloi

Binomial name
- Dicrastylis costelloi F.M.Bailey
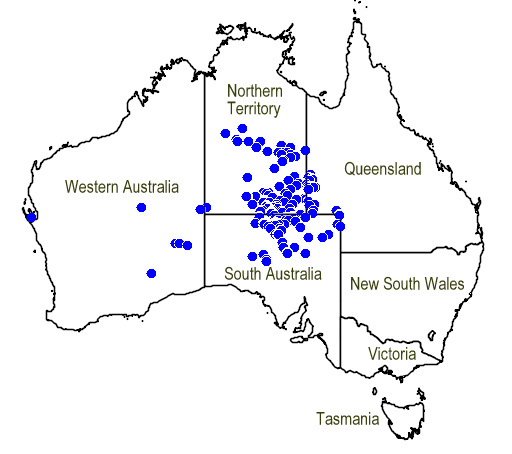

Synonyms
- Dicrastylis costelloi var. eriantha (F.Muell.) Munir; Dicrastylis costelloi var. globulifera Munir; Dicrastylis costelloi var. violacea Munir; Dicrastylis doranii var. eriantha F.Muell.

= Dicrastylis costelloi =

Species of plant

Dicrastylis costelloi is a species of plant within the genus, Dicrastylis, in the family Lamiaceae. It is found in Western Australia, South Australia, the Northern Territory and Queensland.

== Description ==
Dicrastylis costelloi is a shrub, growing to about 40 cm high on red sands. Its stems are roughly circular in cross section with no peltate scales. The opposite and entire leaves are 8–25 mm long by 3.2–6 mm wide, and have branched (dendritic) hairs. There are bracteoles (1–2 mm long), and bracts (5–9 mm long. The flowers are sessile. The calyx has five lobes (1.5 mm long), covered in dendritic hairs, and the white or cream corolla is 4.5–5 mm long, with no dots or stripes in its throat. There are five stamens. In Western Australia it flowers in October.

== Taxonomy ==
It was first described by Frederick Manson Bailey in 1891 as Dicrastylis costelloi. The type specimen was collected "near Lake Nash, on the boundary line between Queensland and the Northern Territory of South Australia" by M. Costello whom the species epithet honours. An isotype (MB0011041108) collected by Costello at Lake Nash is held at the British Museum.

== Gallery ==
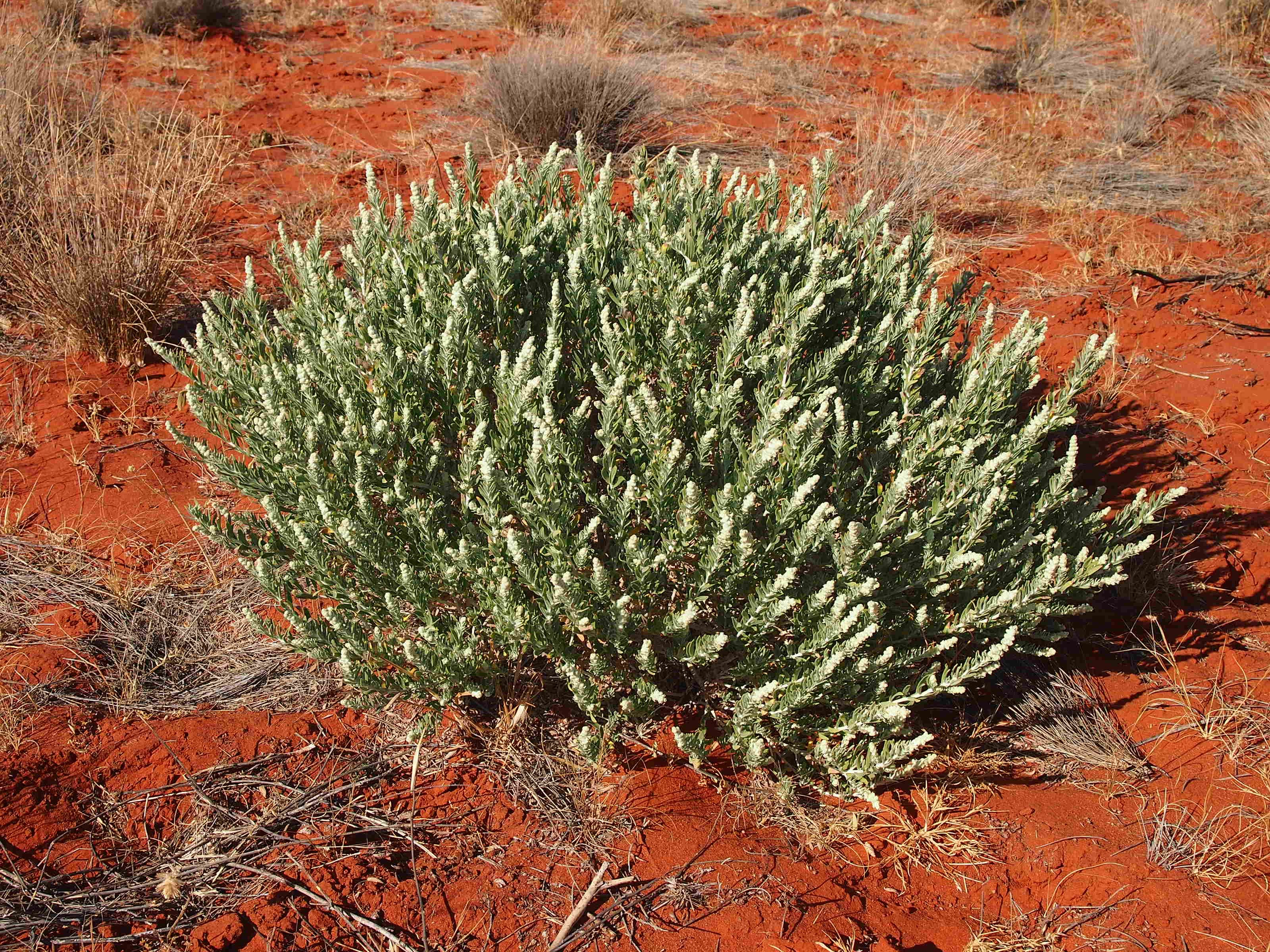

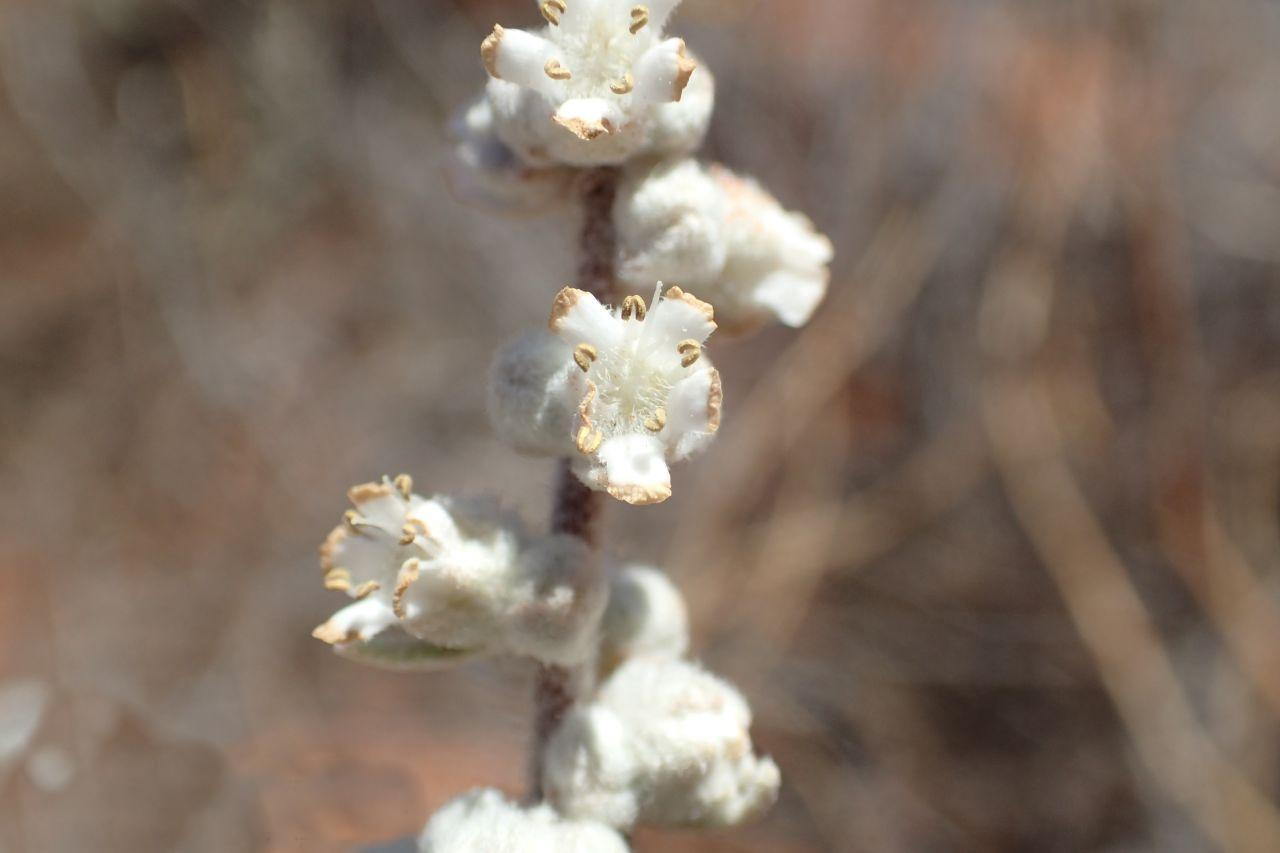

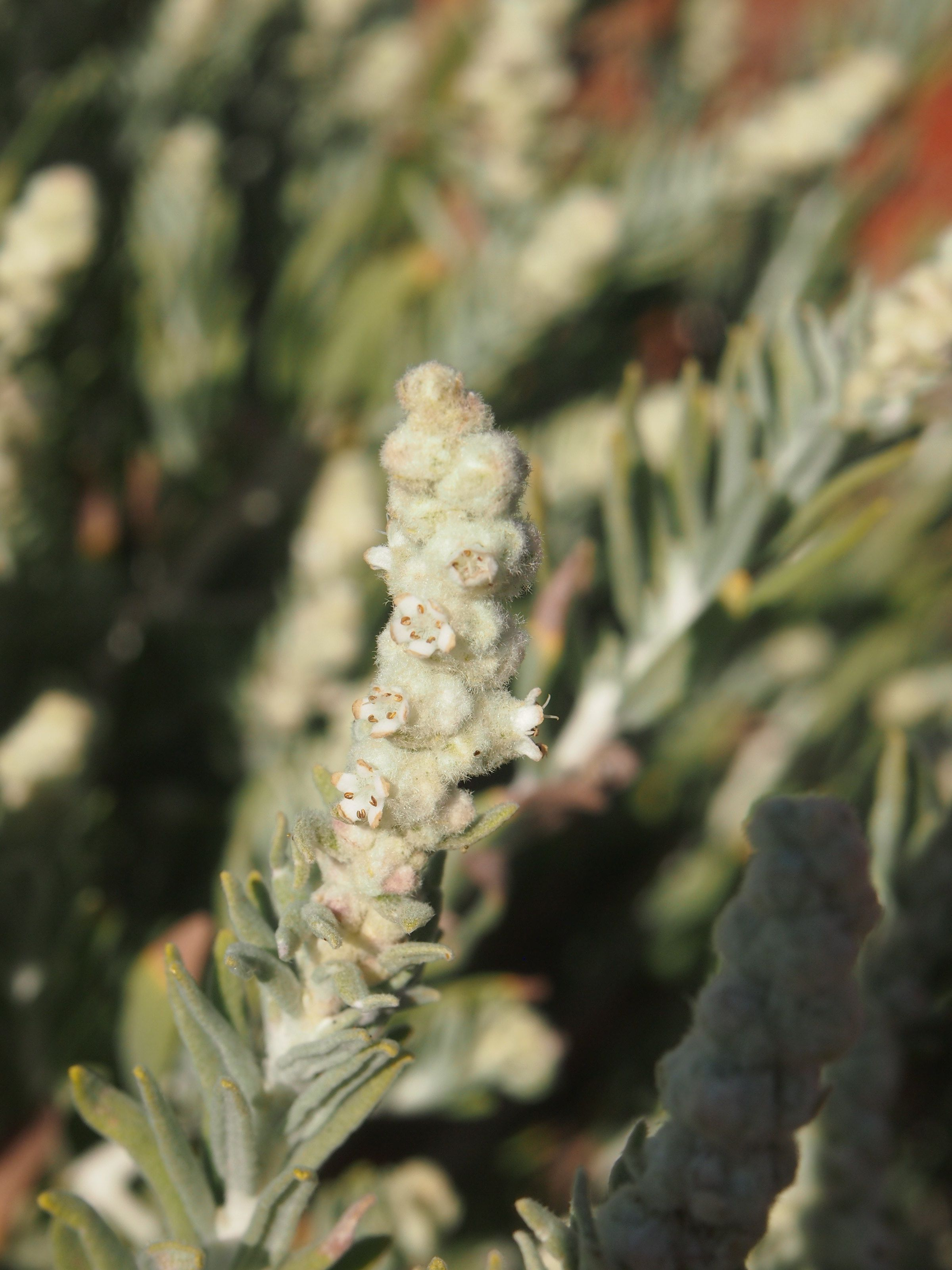
