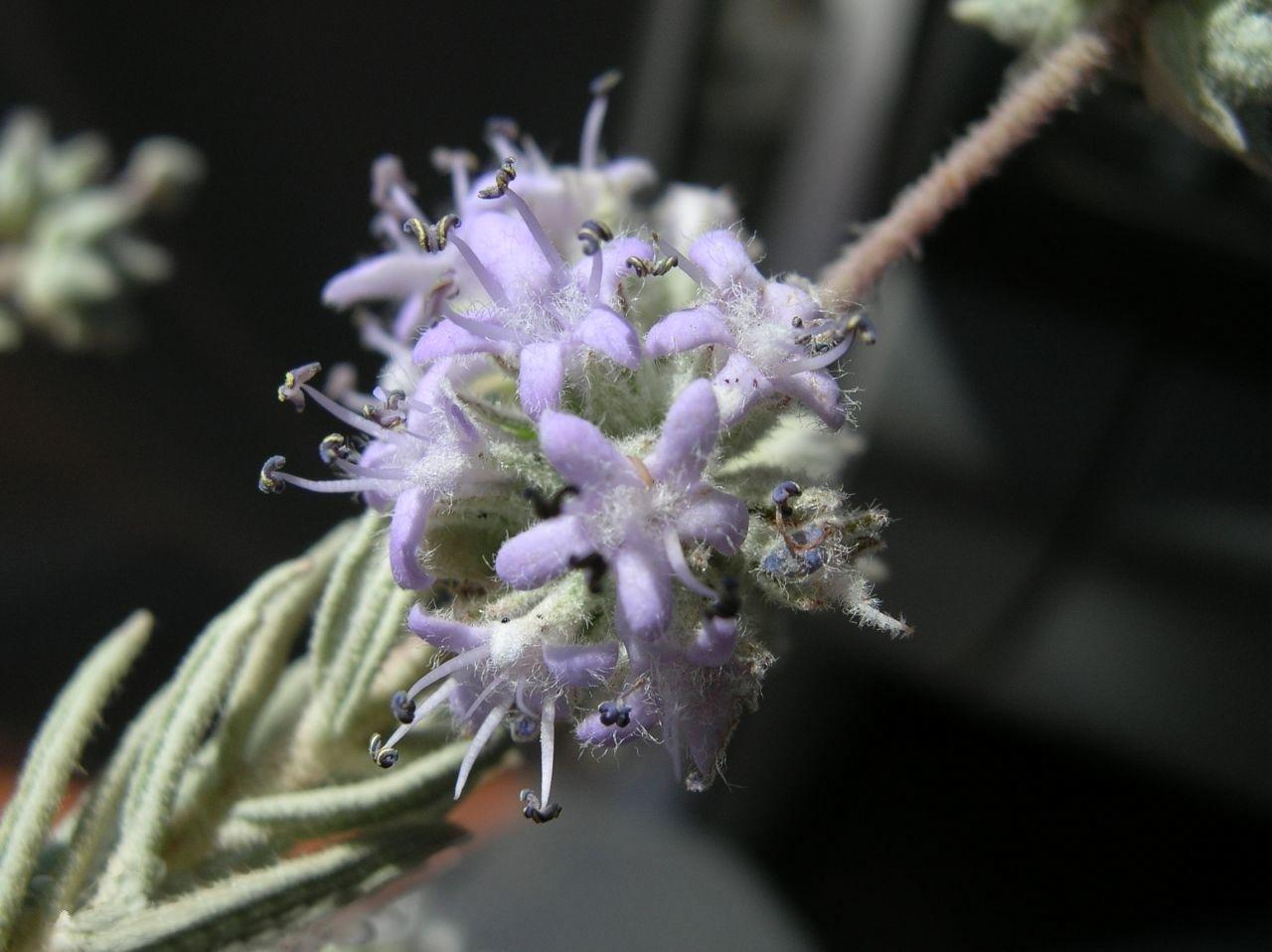

Scientific classification
- Kingdom: Plantae
- Clade: Tracheophytes
- Clade: Angiosperms
- Clade: Eudicots
- Clade: Asterids
- Order: Lamiales
- Family: Lamiaceae
- Genus: Dicrastylis
- Species: D. lewellinii

Binomial name
- Dicrastylis lewellinii (F.Muell.) F.Muell.
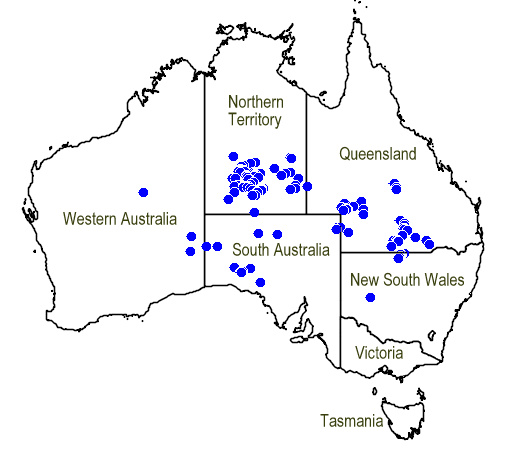

Synonyms
- Chloanthes lewellinii F.Muell. Dicrastylis weddii F.M.Bailey; Pityrodia lewellinii F.Muell.

= Dicrastylis lewellinii =

Species of flowering plant

Dicrastylis lewellinii is a species of plant within the genus, Dicrastylis, in the family Lamiaceae. It is found in Western Australia, the Northern Territory, New South Wales, Queensland and South Australia.

== Description ==
Dicrastylis lewellinii is a shrub, growing to 1 m high, in red sand, on sand dunes. Its stems are roughly circular in cross section, and have no peltate scales. The opposite and entire leaves are 10–15 mm long by 1–2.2 mm wide, and have branched (dendritic) hairs. There are no bracteoles, but there are bracts which are 3.5-7.5 mm long. The flowers are sessile. The calyx has five lobes (2.5–3 mm long), which are covered in dendritic hairs, and the mauve, purple, lilac or violet corolla is 4–9 mm long, with no dots or stripes in its throat. There are five stamens. It generally flowers in spring and summer.

== Habitat ==
In New South Wales it is found in arid and semi-arid areas on sandy soils in spinifex communities and low shrublands.

== Taxonomy ==
It was first described by Ferdinand von Mueller in 1873 as Chloanthes lewellinii, but he redescribed it in 1880 as Dicrastylis lewellinii.

== Gallery ==
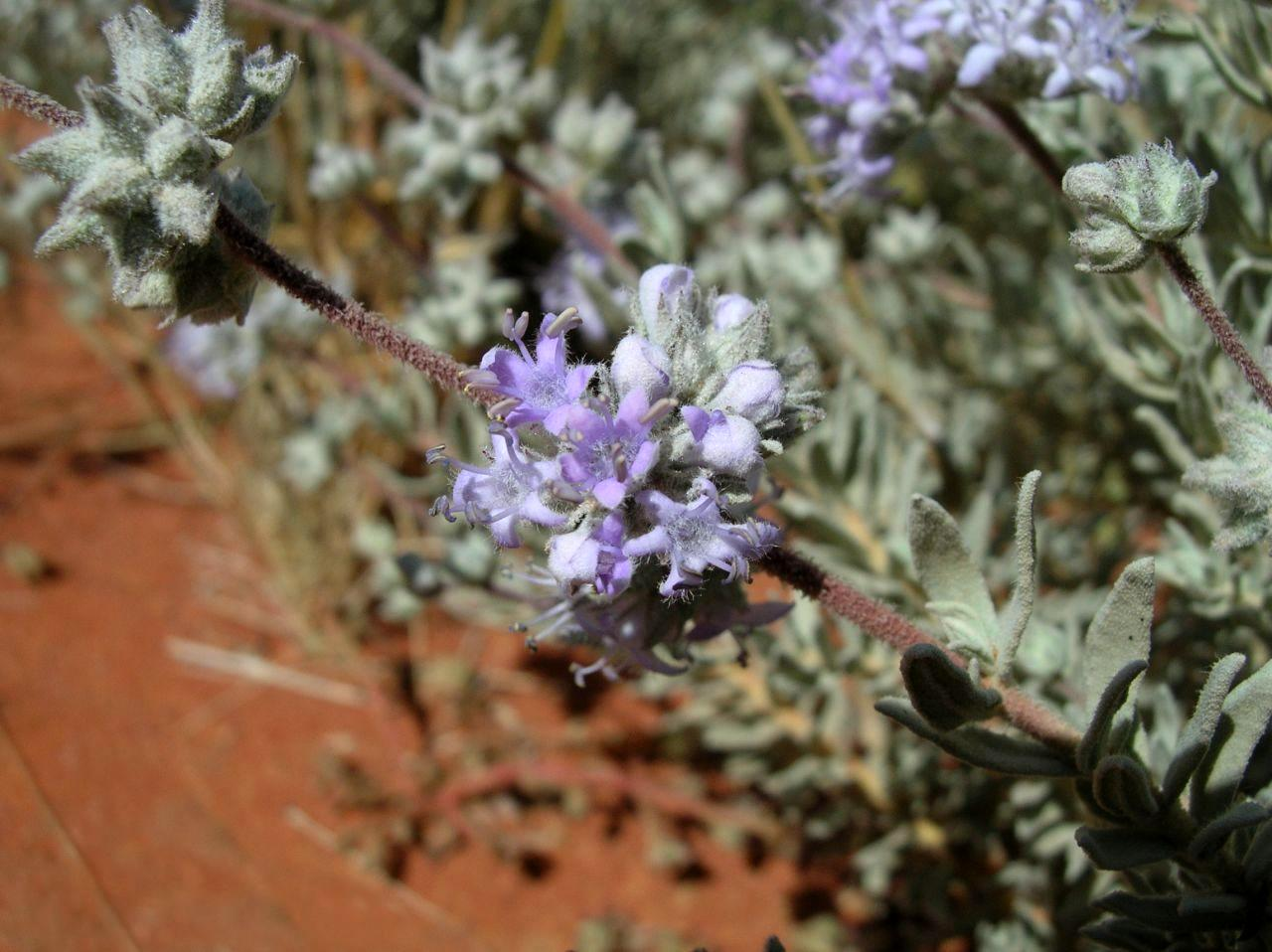

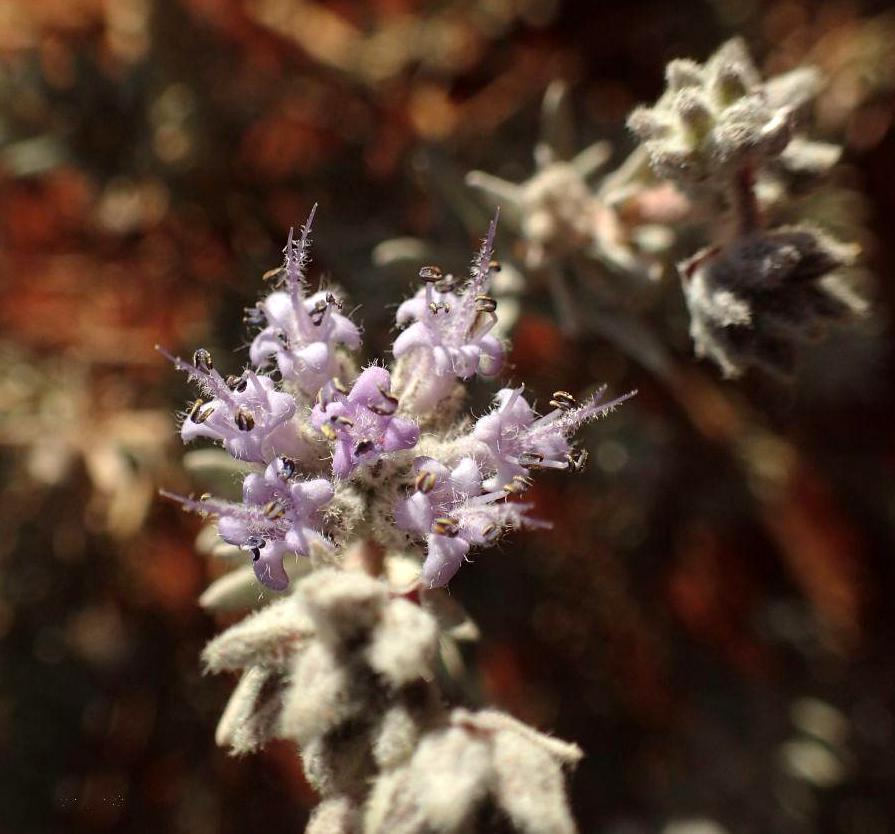

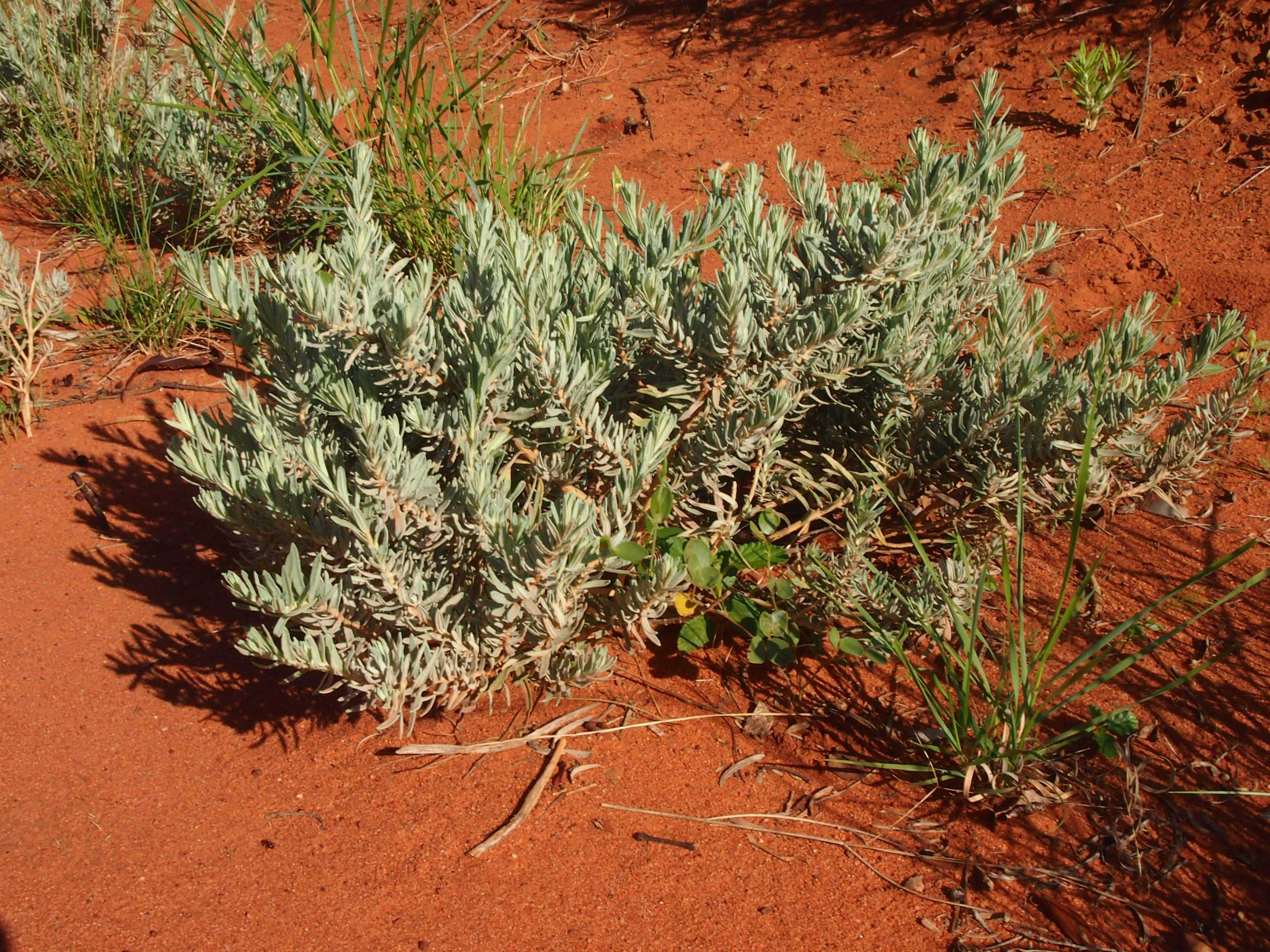
