= Botanical Provinces of Western Australia =

Botanical regions in Western Australia

The botanical provinces of Western Australia (or Beard's Provinces) delineate "natural" phytogeographic regions of WA, based on climate and types of vegetation. John Stanley Beard, in "Plant Life of Western Australia" (p. 29-37) gives a short history of the various mappings.

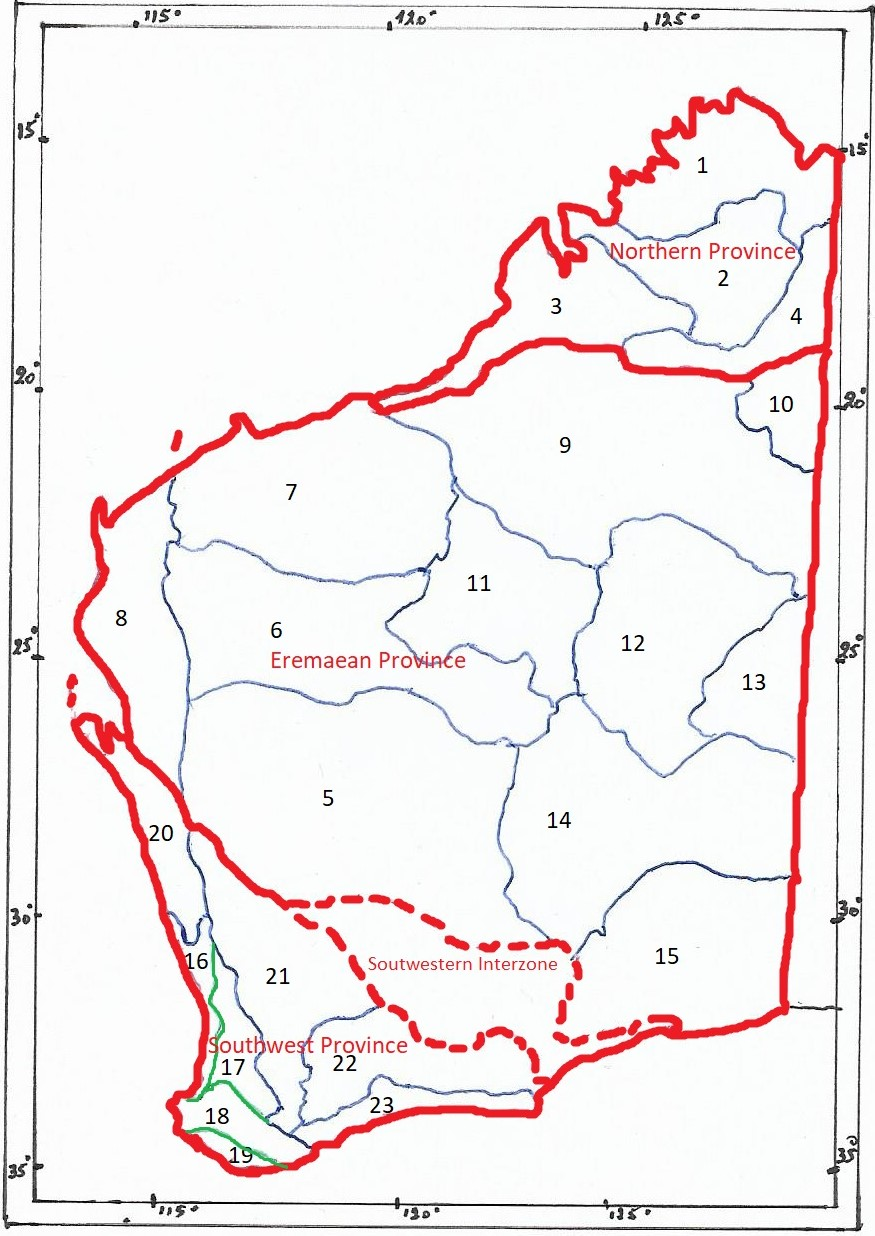
Map of the natural regions of Western Australia according to John Stanley Beard

In 1906, Ludwig Diels divided the state into an Eremaean Province and a South-West Province (together with further subdivisions), based on rainfall ranges, types of vegetation, and species' distributions (Beard, 2015:p. 30). In 1944, C.A. Gardner modified Diels' description, adding the Northern Province, which comprised the Kimberley and Pilbara districts. With Bennetts in 1956, he further refined this to give state-wide divisions. Subsequent work by Beard and others gave the current set of provinces used by Florabase in its descriptions of plants. (See, for example, the entry where Parsonsia diaphanophleba is described as being found in Beard's South-West Province.)

Beard's provinces are:

- Northern Province (comprising North Kimberley, Central Kimberley, East Kimberley and Dampierland.)
- Eremaean Province (comprising Great Sandy Desert, Little Sandy Desert, Gibson Desert, Tanami, Nullarbor Region, Central Ranges, Great Victoria Desert, Murchison, Gascoyne, Pilbara and Carnarvon.)
- South-Western Interzone (comprising the Coolgardie woodlands)
- South-West Province (comprising Northern Sandplains, Wheat Belt Region, Mallee Region, Esperance Plains, Menzies, Warren, Dale and Drummond.)

Many of the subregions above have now been modified to give IBRA regions, among which are:

- Warren (biogeographic region)
- Mallee (biogeographic region)

== See also ==
- For other definitions and uses, see Regions of Western Australia, and Southwest Australia.
- For the current set of Australian phytogeographic regions and subregions, see Interim Biogeographic Regionalisation for Australia (IBRA).
