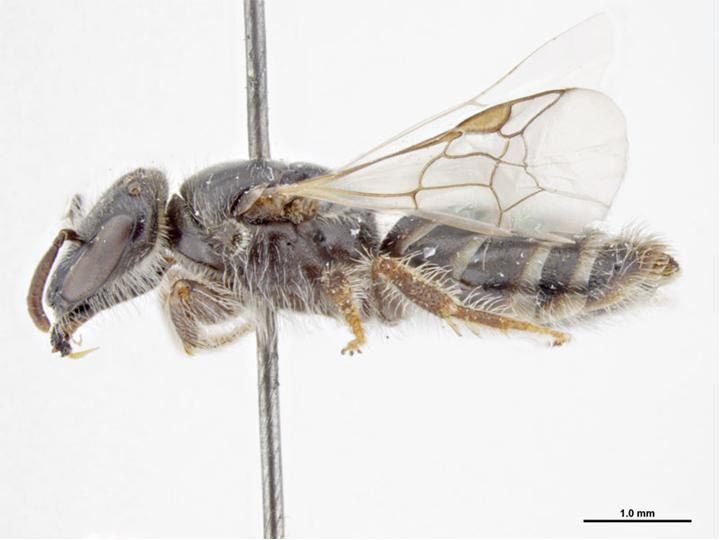
- Female

Scientific classification
- Kingdom: Animalia
- Phylum: Arthropoda
- Clade: Pancrustacea
- Class: Insecta
- Order: Hymenoptera
- Family: Colletidae
- Genus: Euhesma
- Species: E. scoparia

Binomial name
- Euhesma scoparia (Exley, 1998)

Synonyms
- Euryglossa (Euhesma) scoparia Exley, 1998

= Euhesma scoparia =

Species of bee

Euhesma scoparia, or Euhesma (Euhesma) scoparia, is a species of bee in the family Colletidae and the subfamily Euryglossinae. It is endemic to Australia. It was described in 1998 by Australian entomologist Elizabeth Exley.

== Etymology ==
The specific epithet scoparia refers to the species of forage plant on which the type specimens were collected.

== Description ==
Body length of the female is 6.0 mm, wing length 4.5 mm. Colouration is mainly black, dark brown and yellowish.

== Distribution and habitat ==
The species occurs in southern inland Australia. The type locality is the northern Middleback Range in South Australia. It has also been recorded from Mount Jackson, Yellowdine and Mulline in Western Australia.

== Behaviour ==
The adults are flying mellivores. Flowering plants visited by the bees include Eremophila scoparia and Eremophila pantonii.

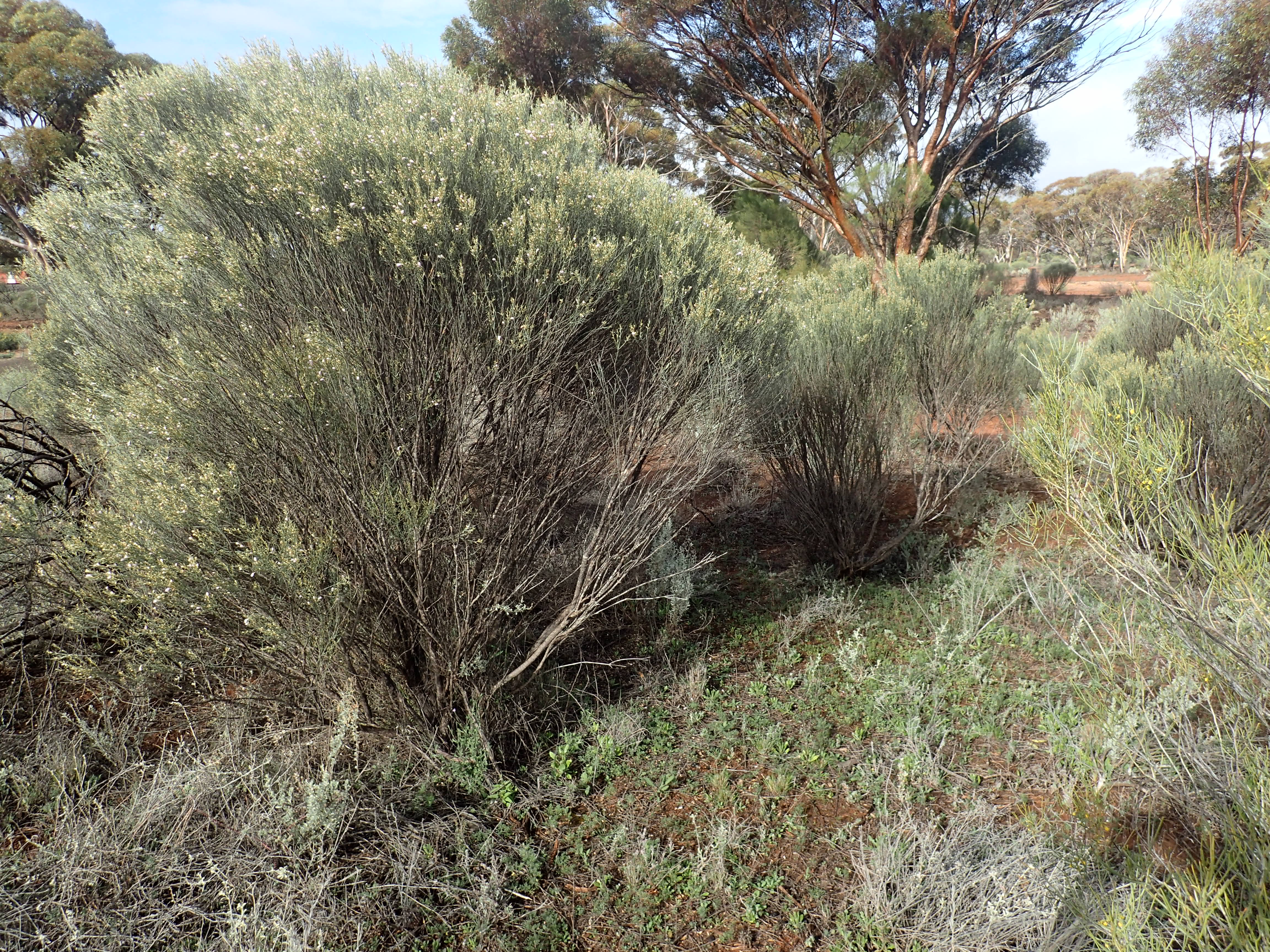
Eremophila scoparia, or silver emubush, a favoured forage plant of the bees

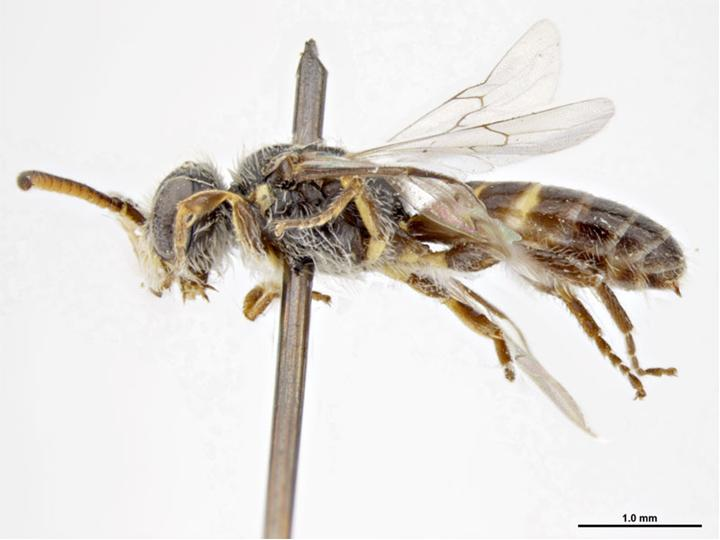
Male
