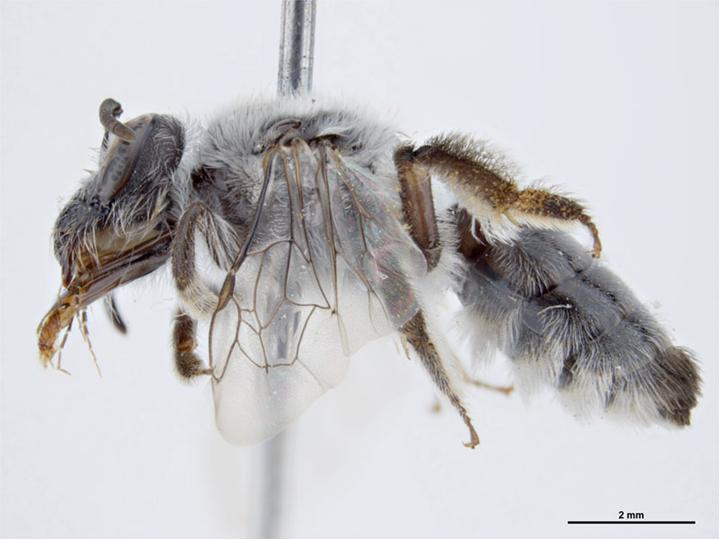
- Female

Scientific classification
- Kingdom: Animalia
- Phylum: Arthropoda
- Clade: Pancrustacea
- Class: Insecta
- Order: Hymenoptera
- Family: Colletidae
- Genus: Leioproctus
- Species: L. nasutus

Binomial name
- Leioproctus nasutus Houston, 1990

= Leioproctus nasutus =

Species of bee

Leioproctus nasutus, or Leioproctus (Leioproctus) nasutus, is a species of bee in the family Colletidae and subfamily Colletinae. It is endemic to Australia. It was described by Australian entomologist Terry Houston in 1990.

== Etymology ==
The specific epithet nasutus (Latin: "with a snout") is an anatomical reference to the strongly protruding clypeus.

== Description ==
The male holotype body length is about 10 mm, head width 2.65 mm; female paratype body length 10 mm, head width 2.9 mm. Integumental colouration is mainly black; the hair is mainly white.

== Distribution and habitat ==
The species occurs in southern inland Australia. The type locality is Meleya Well on Thundelarra conservation reserve in the Yalgoo bioregion of Western Australia.

== Behaviour ==
The adults are flying mellivores. Flowering plants visited by the bees include Eremophila pantonii, Eremophila longifolia and Scaevola spinescens.

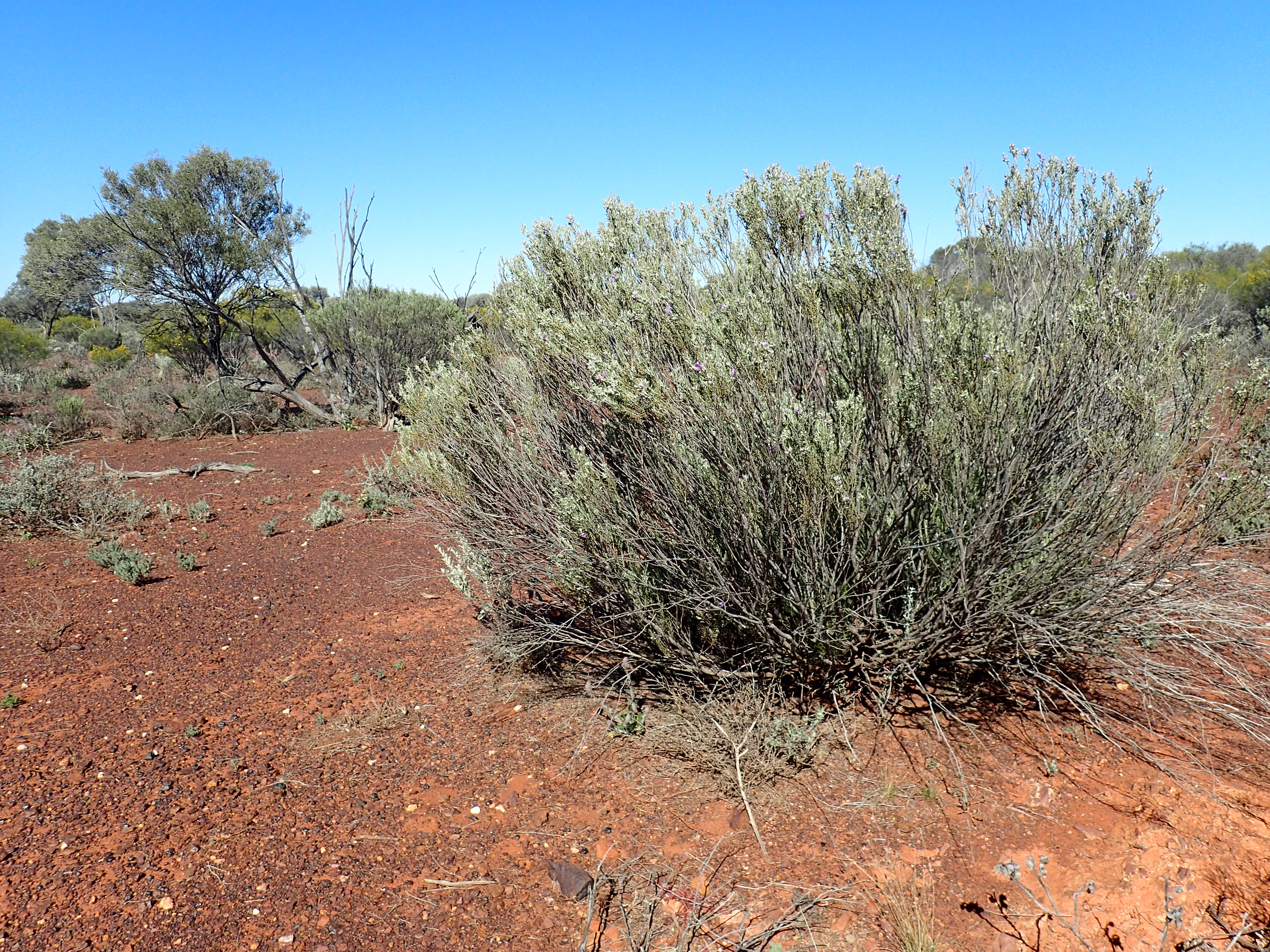
Eremophila pantonii (broombush), a forage plant of the bees

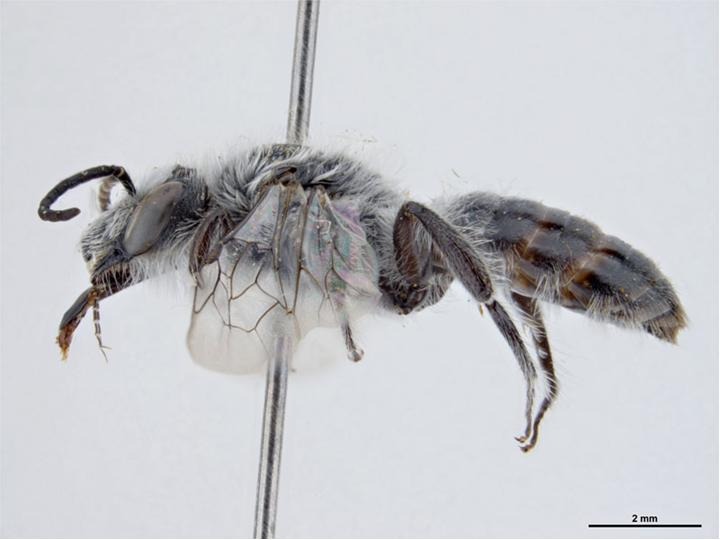
Male
