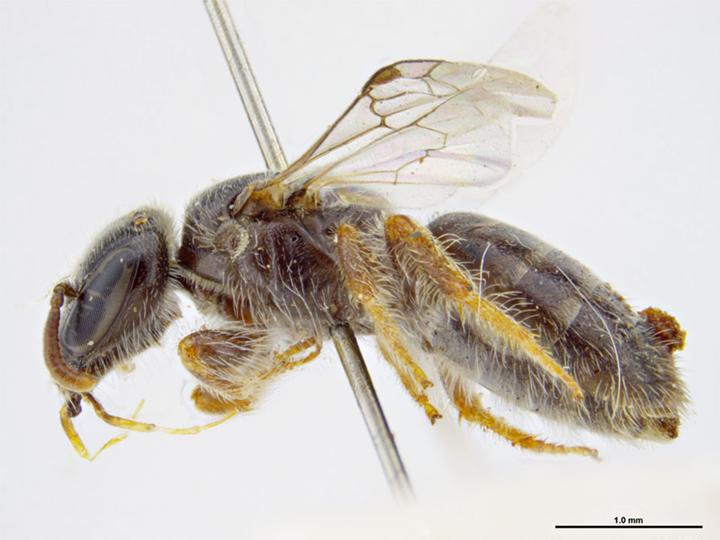
- Female

Scientific classification
- Kingdom: Animalia
- Phylum: Arthropoda
- Clade: Pancrustacea
- Class: Insecta
- Order: Hymenoptera
- Family: Colletidae
- Genus: Euhesma
- Species: E. walkeri

Binomial name
- Euhesma walkeri (Exley, 1998)

Synonyms
- Euryglossa (Euhesma) walkeri Exley, 1998

= Euhesma walkeri =

Species of bee

Euhesma walkeri, or Euhesma (Euhesma) walkeri, is a species of bee in the family Colletidae and the subfamily Euryglossinae. It is endemic to Australia. It was described in 1998 by Australian entomologist Elizabeth Exley.

== Etymology ==
The specific epithet walkeri honours Dr Ken Walker, collector of the species, with whom Exley "spent many hours collecting and discussing bees".

== Description ==
Body length of the female is 4.5 mm, wing length 3.0 mm. Colouration is mainly black, dark brown and yellowish.

== Distribution and habitat ==
The species occurs in southern inland Western Australia. The type locality is 40 km north of Norseman, in the Goldfields–Esperance region.

== Behaviour ==
The adults are flying mellivores. Flowering plants visited by the bees include Eremophila scoparia and Eucalyptus species.

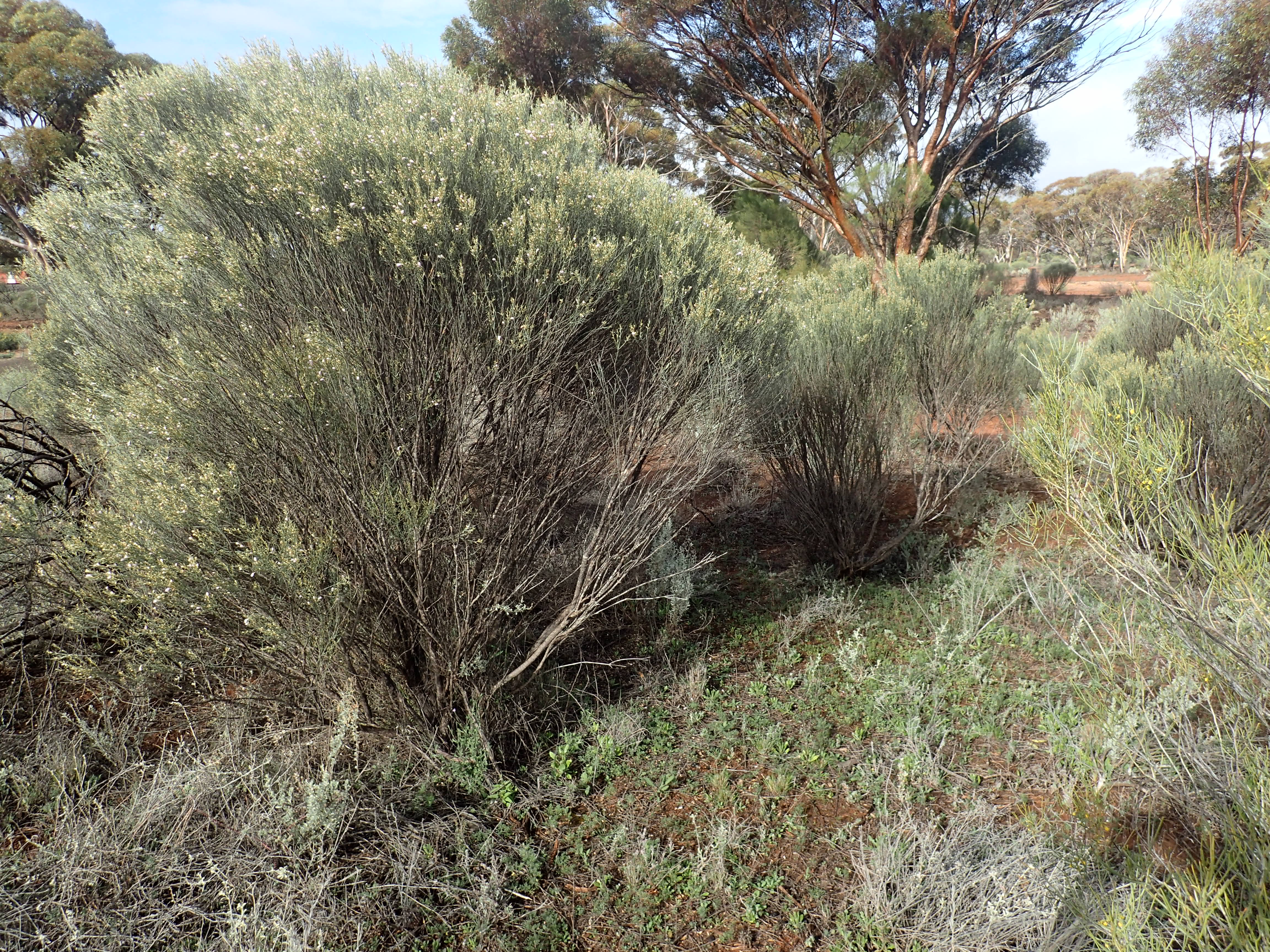
Eremophila scoparia, or silver emubush, a favoured forage plant of the bees

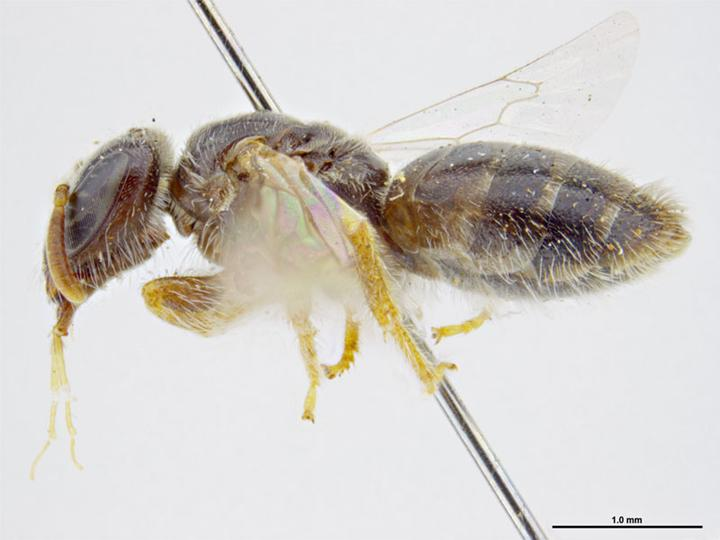
Male
