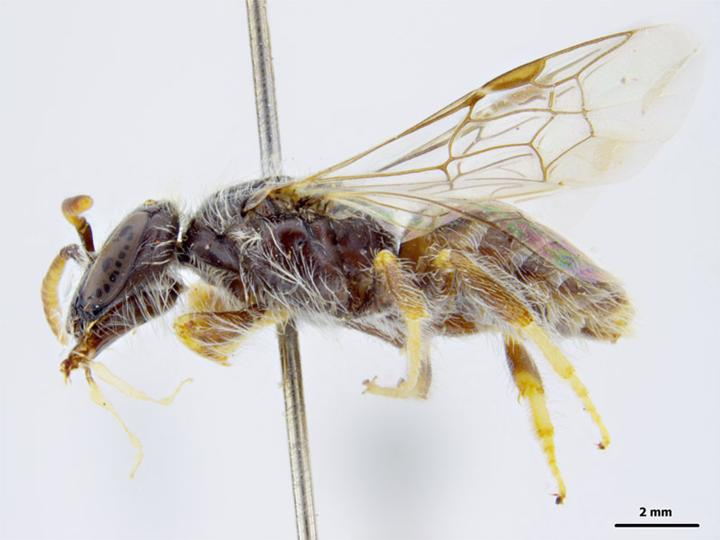
- Female

Scientific classification
- Kingdom: Animalia
- Phylum: Arthropoda
- Clade: Pancrustacea
- Class: Insecta
- Order: Hymenoptera
- Family: Colletidae
- Genus: Euhesma
- Species: E. pantoni

Binomial name
- Euhesma pantoni (Exley, 1998)

Synonyms
- Euryglossa (Euhesma) pantoni Exley, 1998

= Euhesma pantoni =

Species of bee

Euhesma pantoni, or Euhesma (Euhesma) pantoni, is a species of bee in the family Colletidae and the subfamily Euryglossinae. It is endemic to Australia. It was described in 1998 by Australian entomologist Elizabeth Exley.

== Etymology ==
The specific epithet pantoni refers to the species of forage plant on which the bees were collected.

== Description ==
Body length of the female is 6.0 mm, wing length 5.0 mm; that of the male is body length is 6.0 mm, wing length 5.0 mm. Colouration is mainly black, dark brown and yellow.

== Distribution and habitat ==
The species occurs in southern inland Western Australia. The type locality is 18 km west-south-west of Mulline, in the Goldfields–Esperance region.

== Behaviour ==
The adults are flying mellivores. Flowering plants visited by the bees include Eremophila pantonii.

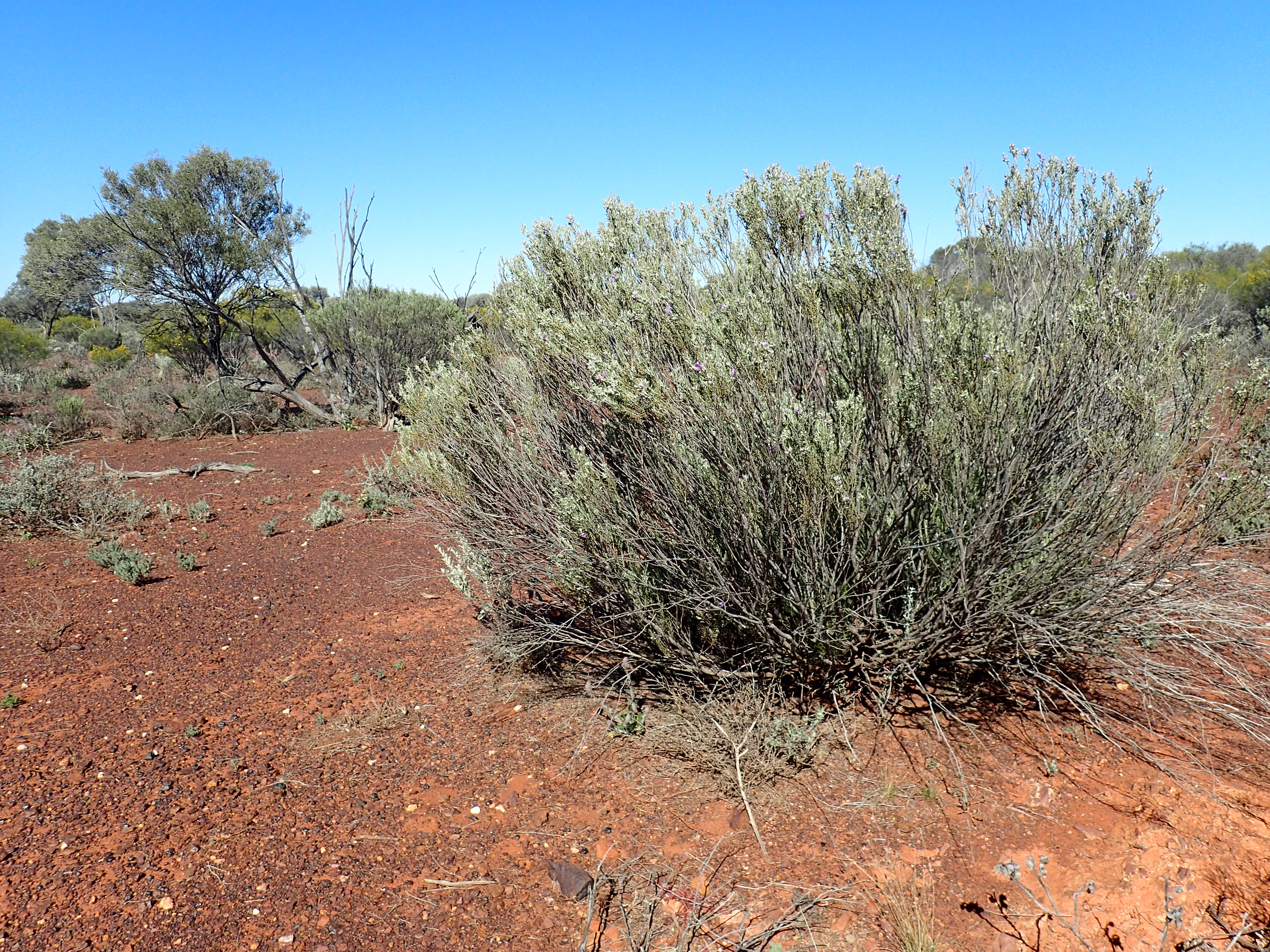
Eremophila pantonii, or broombush, is a favoured forage plant of the bees

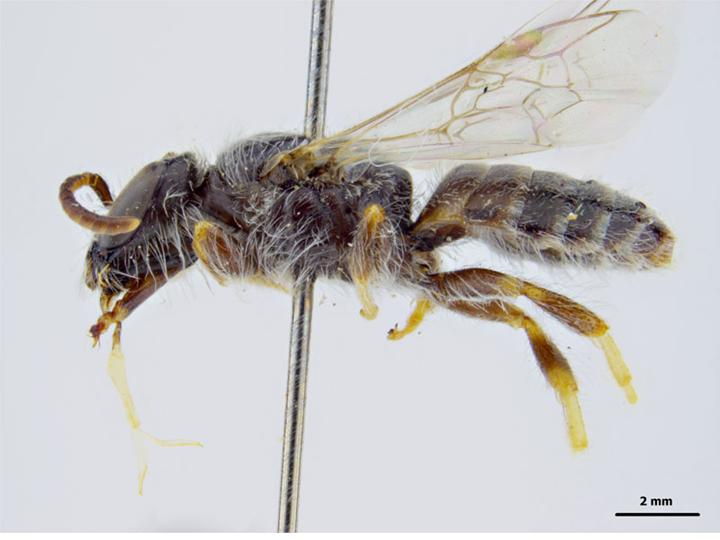
Male
