= Leioproctus concavus =

Scientific classification
- Kingdom: Animalia
- Phylum: Arthropoda
- Clade: Pancrustacea
- Class: Insecta
- Order: Hymenoptera
- Family: Colletidae
- Genus: Leioproctus
- Species: L. concavus

Binomial name
- Leioproctus concavus Houston, 1990

Species of bee

Leioproctus concavus, or Leioproctus (Leioproctus) concavus, is a species of bee in the family Colletidae and subfamily Colletinae. It is endemic to Australia. It was described by Australian entomologist Terry Houston in 1990.

== Etymology ==
The specific epithet concavus (Latin: “concave”) is an anatomical reference to the form of the clypeus.

== Description ==
The female holotype body length is about 6 mm. Integumental colouration is mainly black to dark brown, with some orange-brown on the metasoma; the hair is white to brown.

== Distribution and habitat ==
The species occurs in south-west Western Australia near Norseman and Kalgoorlie. The type locality is 70–75 km east-north-east of Norseman.

== Behaviour ==
The adults are flying mellivores. Flowering plants visited by the bees include Eremophila scoparia.

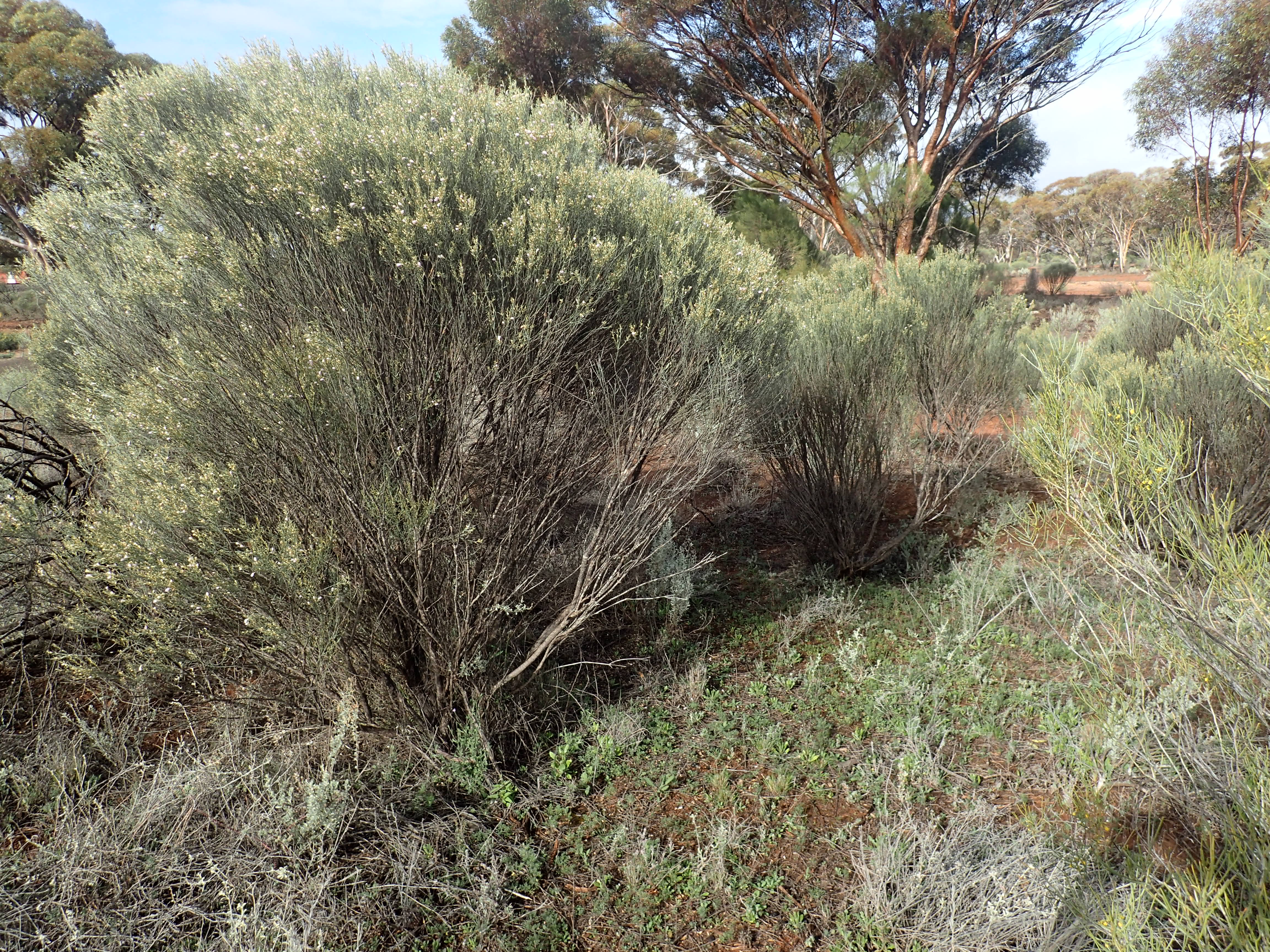
Eremophila scoparia (silver emubush), a forage plant of the bees

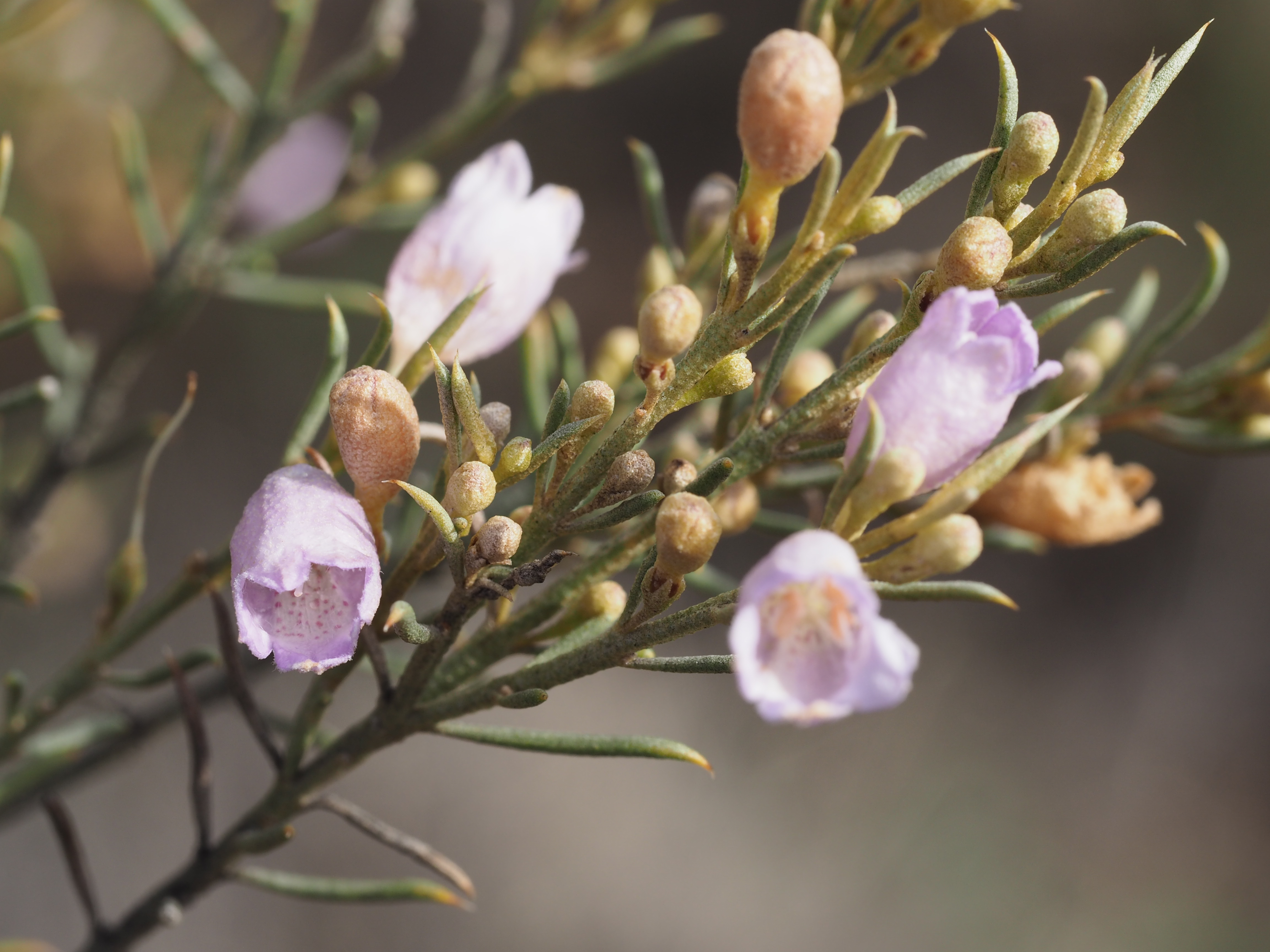
Eremophila scoparia flowers
