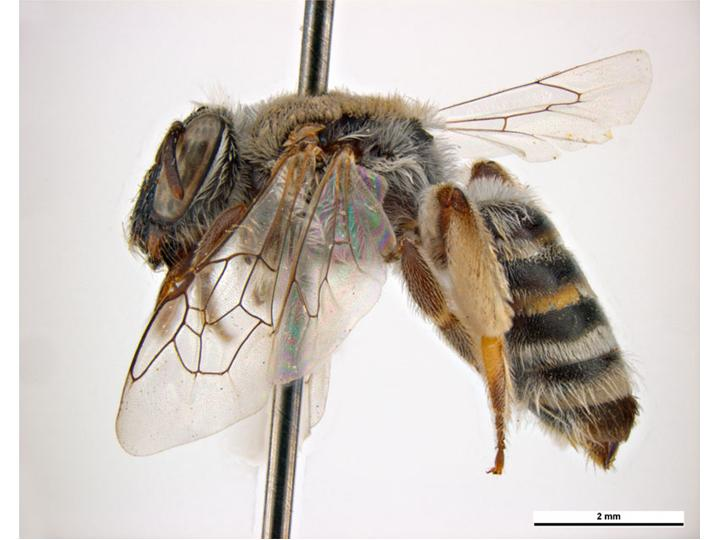
- Female

Scientific classification
- Kingdom: Animalia
- Phylum: Arthropoda
- Clade: Pancrustacea
- Class: Insecta
- Order: Hymenoptera
- Family: Colletidae
- Genus: Leioproctus
- Species: L. alloeopus

Binomial name
- Leioproctus alloeopus Maynard 1991

= Leioproctus alloeopus =

Species of bee

Leioproctus alloeopus, or Leioproctus (Protomorpha) alloeopus, is a species of bee in the family Colletidae and subfamily Colletinae. It is endemic to Australia. It was described by Australian entomologist Glynn Maynard in 1991.

== Etymology ==
The specific epithet alloeopus (Greek: "different" + "foot") refers to differences between the hind legs of this and the type species of the subgenus.

== Description ==
Male body length is about 6 mm, female body length 7 mm. Integumental colouration is mainly black; the hair is mostly white.

== Distribution and habitat ==
The species occurs in Western Australia. The type locality is 57 km south of Leonora in the Goldfields–Esperance region.

== Behaviour ==
The adults are flying mellivores. Flowering plants visited by the bees include Scaevola spinescens.

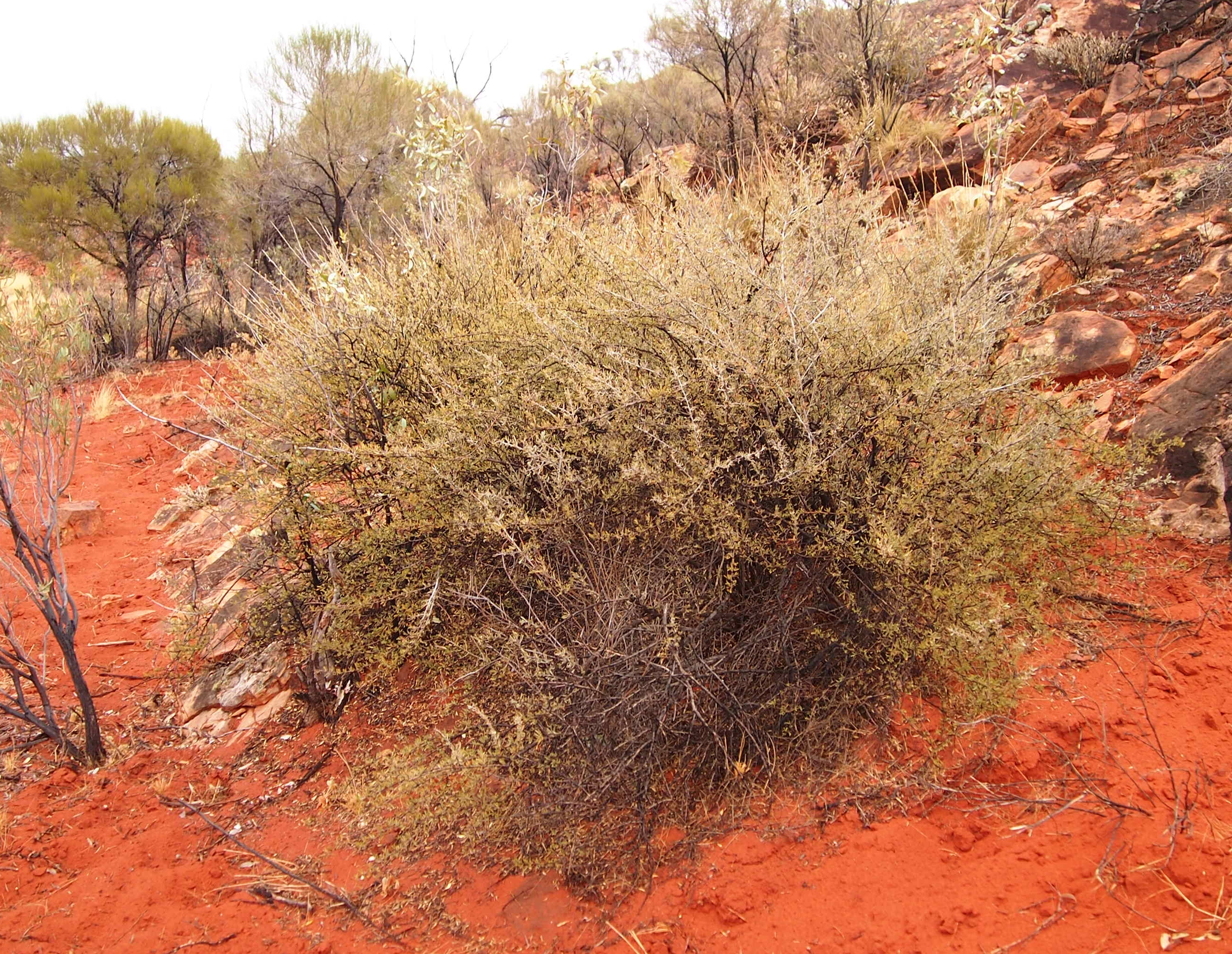
Scaevola spinescens (currant bush), a forage plant of the bees

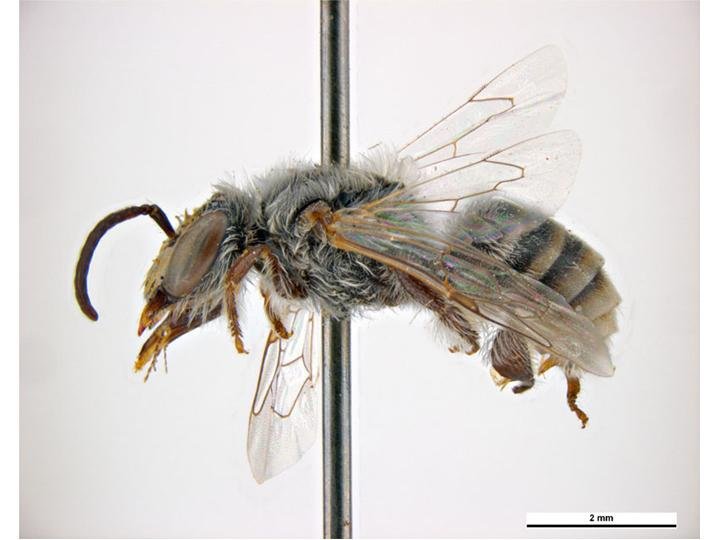
Male
