= Leioproctus kumarina =

Scientific classification
- Kingdom: Animalia
- Phylum: Arthropoda
- Clade: Pancrustacea
- Class: Insecta
- Order: Hymenoptera
- Family: Colletidae
- Genus: Leioproctus
- Species: L. kumarina

Binomial name
- Leioproctus kumarina Houston, 1990

Species of bee

Leioproctus kumarina, or Leioproctus (Leioproctus) kumarina, is a species of bee in the family Colletidae and subfamily Colletinae. It is endemic to Australia. It was described by Australian entomologist Terry Houston in 1990.

== Etymology ==
The specific epithet kumarina refers to the nearest settlement to the type locality.

== Description ==
The female holotype body length is about 8.5 mm, head width 2.45 mm. Integumental colouration is black to dark brown; the hair is white to brown.

== Distribution and habitat ==
The species occurs in Western Australia. The type locality is near Kumarina, some 133 km south of Newman, in the Mid West region.

== Behaviour ==
The adults are flying mellivores. Flowering plants visited by the bees include Scaevola spinescens.

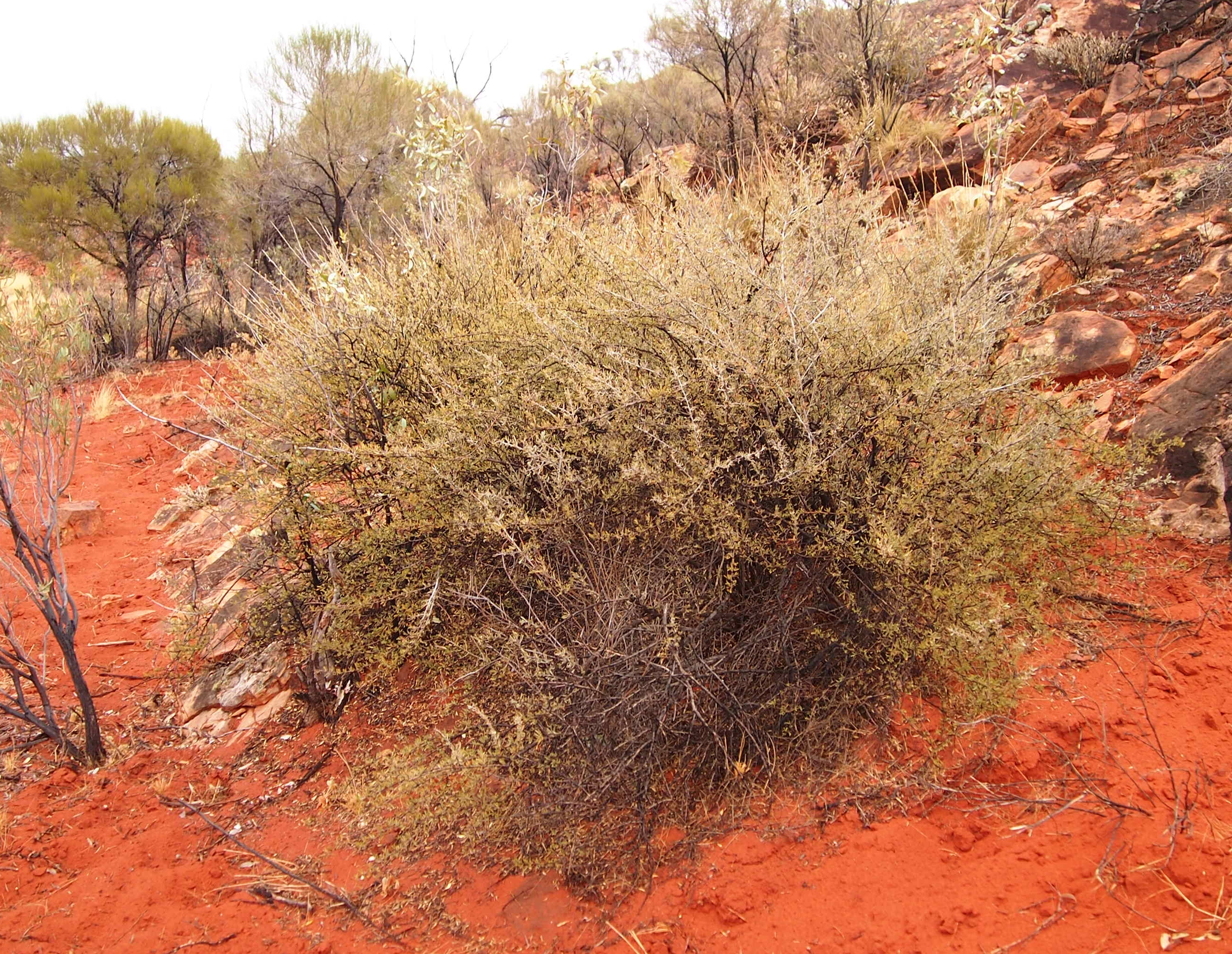
Scaevola spinescens (currant bush), a forage plant of the bees

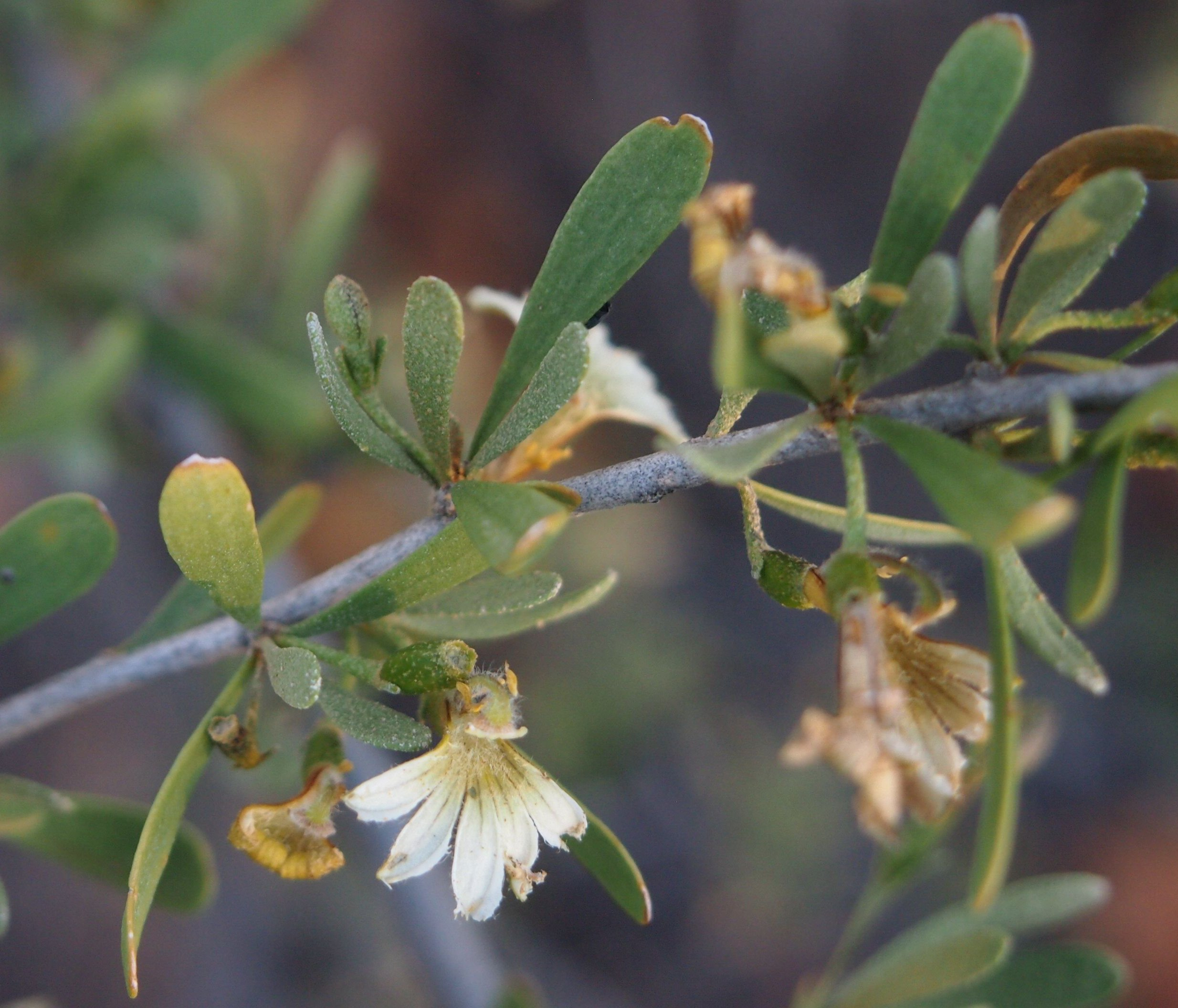
Scaevola spinescens flowers
