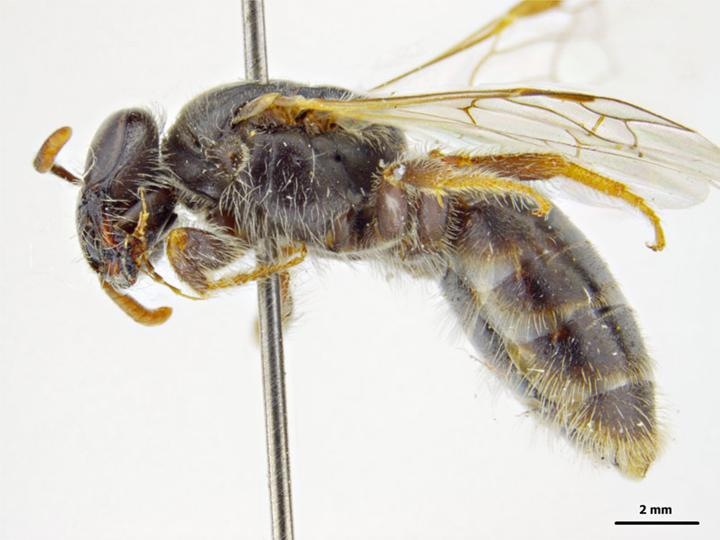
- Female

Scientific classification
- Kingdom: Animalia
- Phylum: Arthropoda
- Clade: Pancrustacea
- Class: Insecta
- Order: Hymenoptera
- Family: Colletidae
- Genus: Euhesma
- Species: E. leonora

Binomial name
- Euhesma leonora (Exley, 1998)

Synonyms
- Euryglossa (Euhesma) leonora Exley, 1998

= Euhesma leonora =

Species of bee

Euhesma leonora, or Euhesma (Euhesma) leonora, is a species of bee in the family Colletidae and the subfamily Euryglossinae. It is endemic to Australia. It was described in 1998 by Australian entomologist Elizabeth Exley.

== Etymology ==
The specific epithet leonora refers to the type locality.

== Description ==
Body length of the female is 5.5 mm, wing length 4.0 mm; that of the male is body length 4.5 mm, wing length 3.7 mm. Colouration is mainly black, dark brown and yellowish.

== Distribution and habitat ==
The species occurs in southern inland Western Australia. The type locality is 50 km east of Leonora in the Goldfields–Esperance region.

== Behaviour ==
The adults are flying mellivores. Flowering plants visited by the bees include Eremophila pantonii.

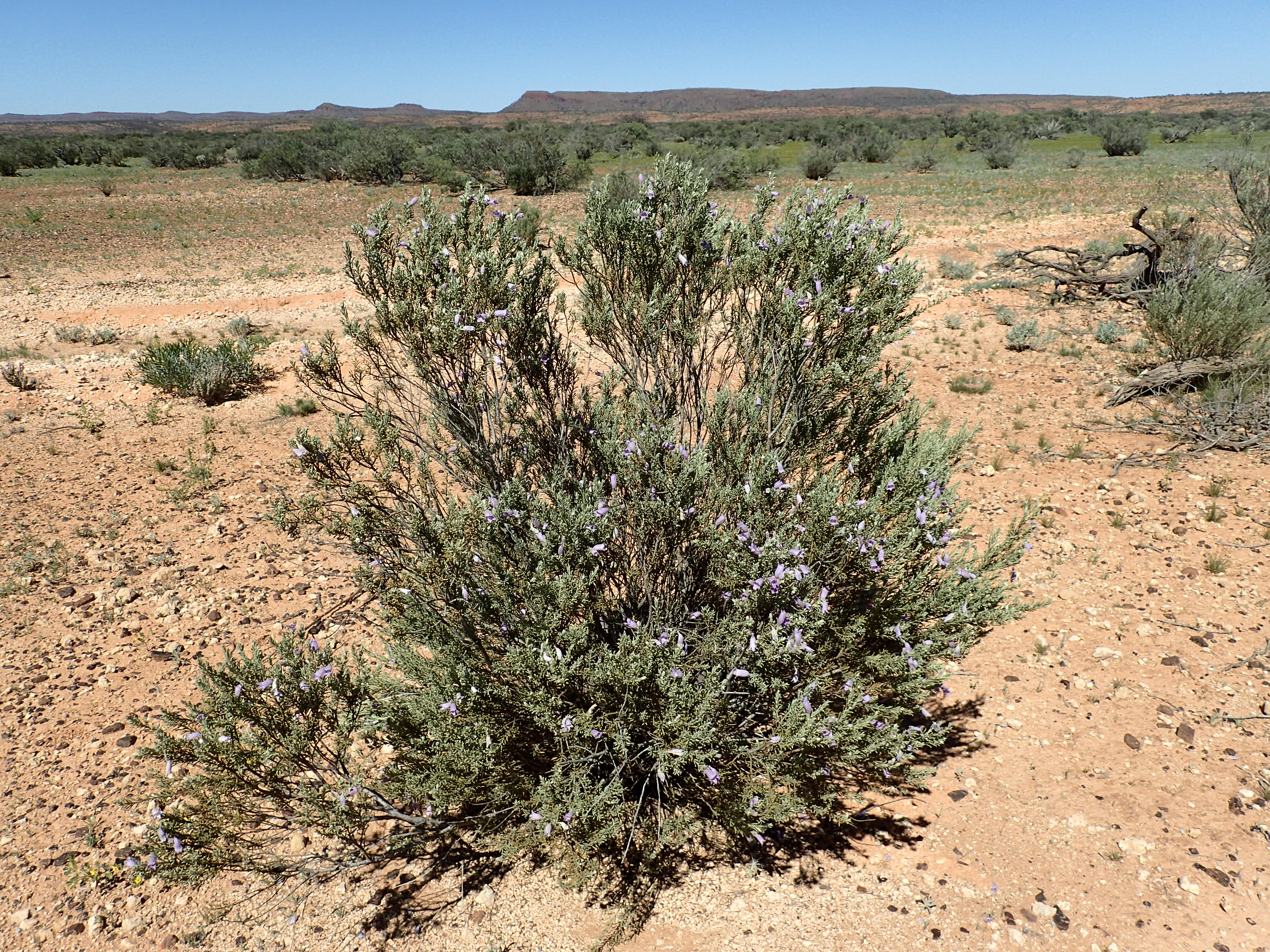
Eremophila pantonii, or broombush, a favoured forage plant of the bees

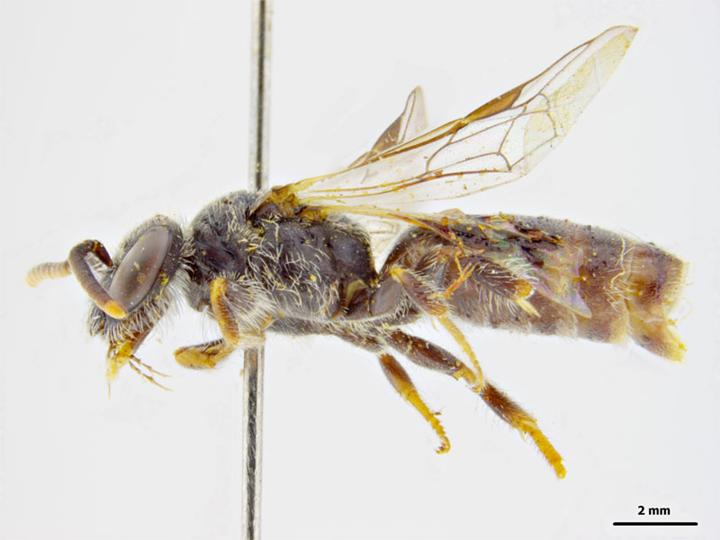
Male
