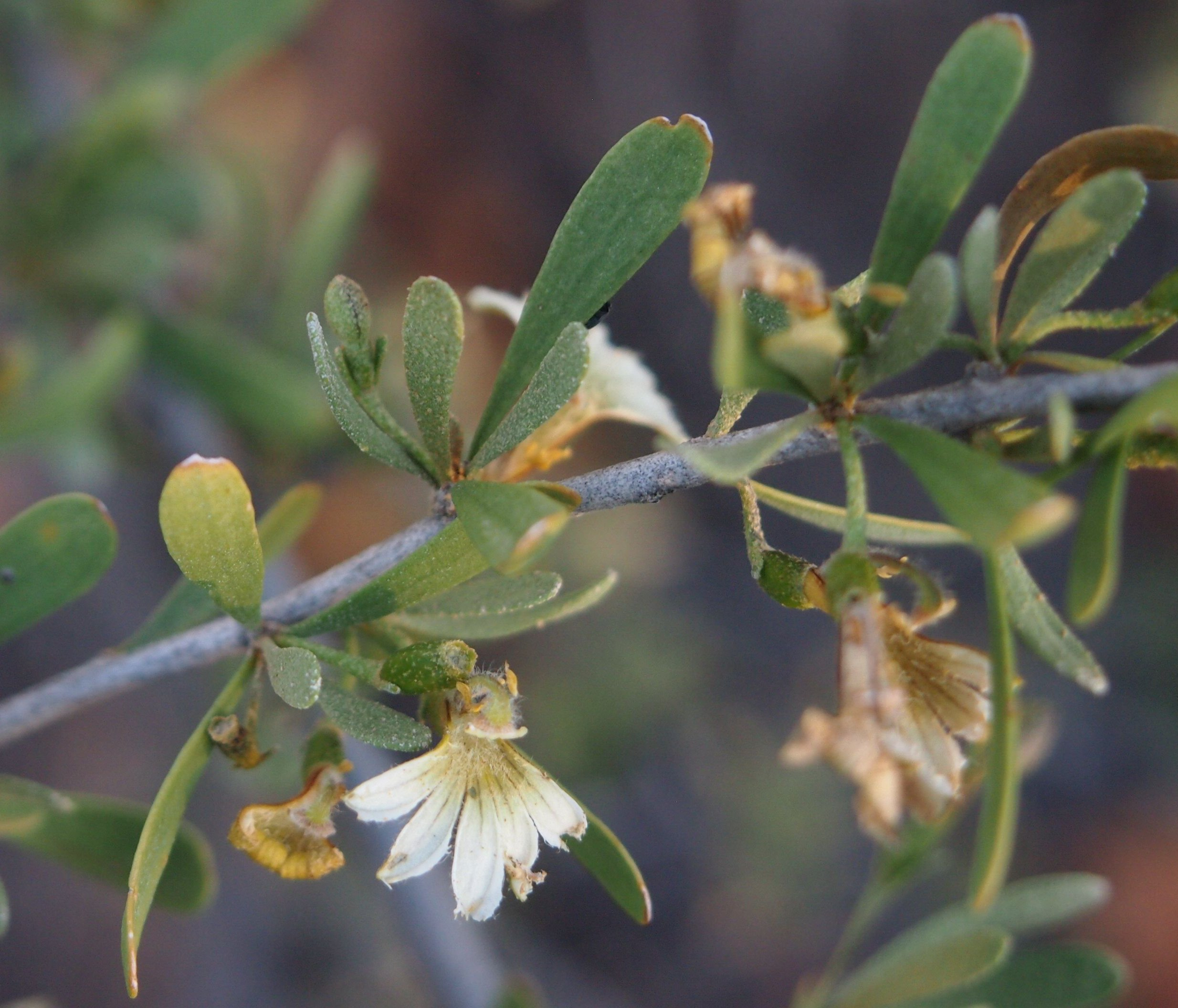

Conservation status
- Least Concern (TPWCA)

Scientific classification
- Kingdom: Plantae
- Clade: Tracheophytes
- Clade: Angiosperms
- Clade: Eudicots
- Clade: Asterids
- Order: Asterales
- Family: Goodeniaceae
- Genus: Scaevola
- Species: S. spinescens

Binomial name
- Scaevola spinescens R.Br.
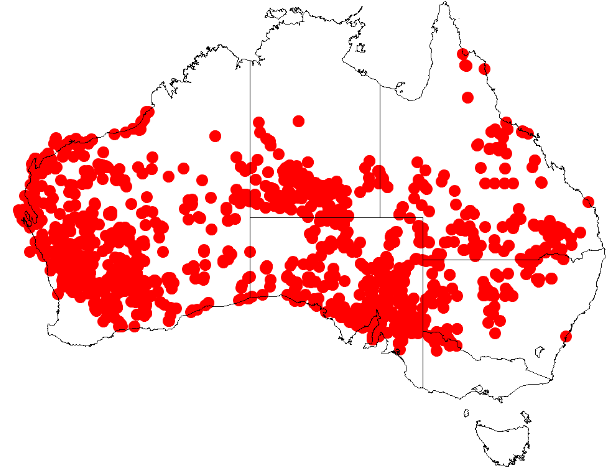
- Occurrence data from Australasian Virtual Herbarium

= Scaevola spinescens =

Species of plant

Scaevola spinescens (common names of currant bush & maroon bush) is a shrub in the family Goodeniaceae, found in all mainland Australian states and territories, in the drier parts.

Common names by which it is known in the Northern Territory are spiny fanflower, prickly fanflower, and Incense bush, while the common names listed for New South Wales are maroon bush, fan bush, prickly fan flower.

It was first described in 1810 by Robert Brown who named it Scaevola spinescens.

In south west Western Australia, the Noongar people called it Murin Murin and made decoctions from the whole plant for the treatment of cancer, intestinal complaints, heart disease, and urinary and kidney complaints.

== Conservation status ==
In the state of Western Australia it is classified as "not threatened", and in the Northern Territory as being of "least concern". In New South Wales and South Australia no comment is made, while in Victoria it is rather rare.

== Gallery ==
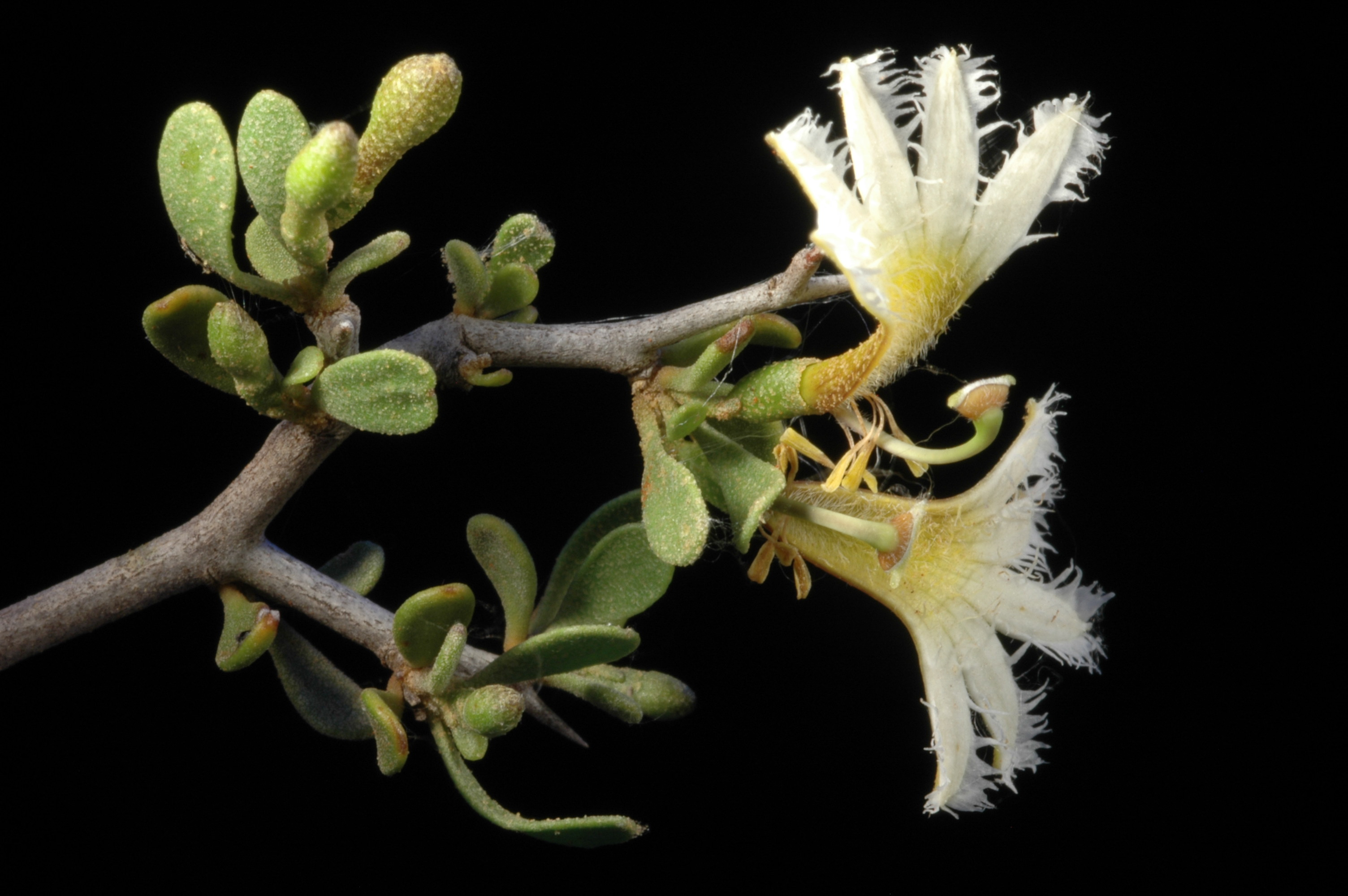

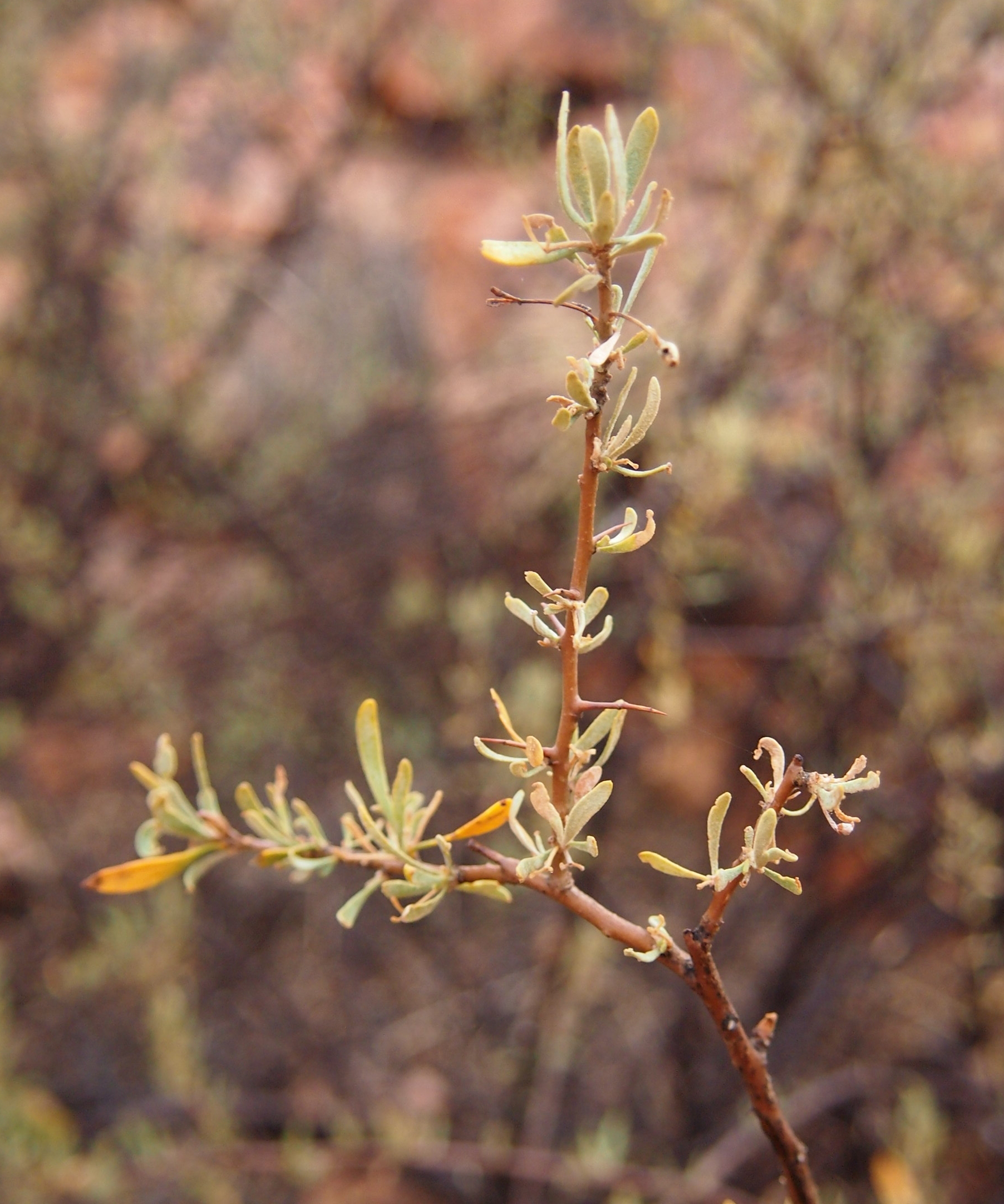

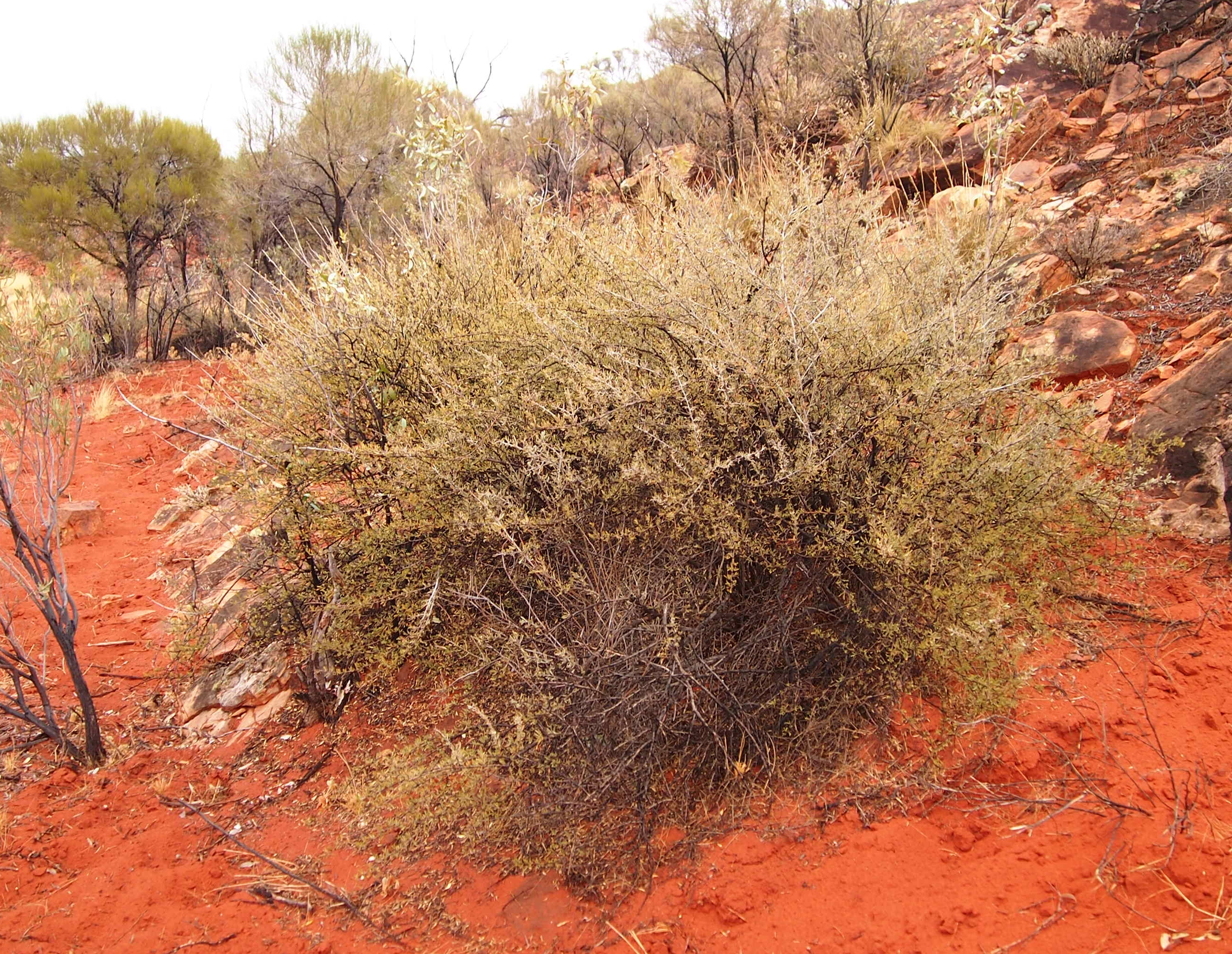
