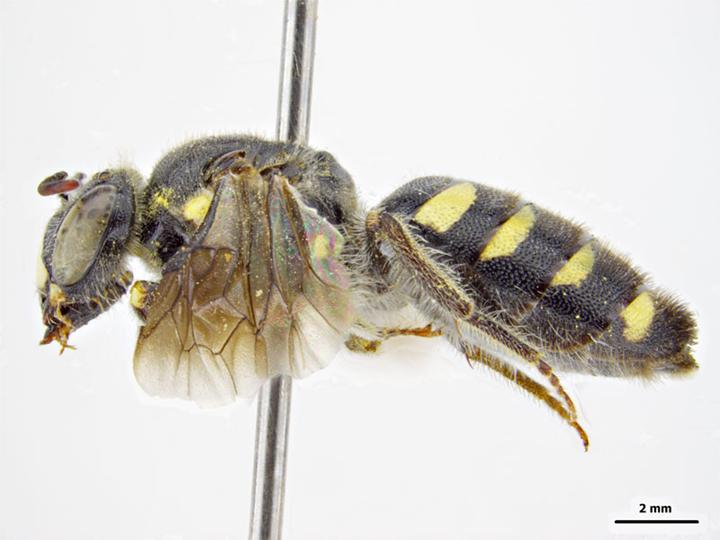
- Euhesma lucida

Scientific classification
- Kingdom: Animalia
- Phylum: Arthropoda
- Clade: Pancrustacea
- Class: Insecta
- Order: Hymenoptera
- Family: Colletidae
- Subfamily: Euryglossinae
- Genus: Euhesma; Michener, 1965

= Euhesma =

Genus of bees

Euhesma is a genus within the bee family Colletidae and subfamily Euryglossinae found in Australia. There are about 90 species described, with the type species Euhesma wahlenbergiae. The group lacks strong unifying features.

== Subgenera ==
There are two subgenera:

- Euhesma (Euhesma) Michener, 1965
- Euhesma (Parahesma) Michener, 1965

== Species ==
See: List of Euhesma species:
