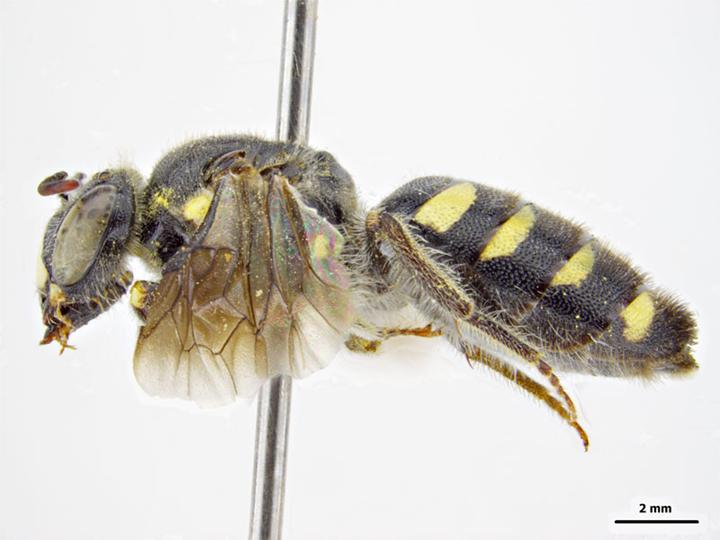
- Female

Scientific classification
- Kingdom: Animalia
- Phylum: Arthropoda
- Clade: Pancrustacea
- Class: Insecta
- Order: Hymenoptera
- Family: Colletidae
- Genus: Euhesma
- Species: E. lucida

Binomial name
- Euhesma lucida Exley, 2002

= Euhesma lucida =

Species of bee

Euhesma lucida, or Euhesma (Euhesma) lucida, is a species of bee in the family Colletidae and the subfamily Euryglossinae. It is endemic to Australia. It was described in 2002 by Australian entomologist Elizabeth Exley.

== Etymology ==
The specific epithet lucida, from the Latin, is an anatomical reference to the glossiness of the metasoma.

== Description ==
The body length of the female is 11 mm, wing length 7 mm. Colouration is mainly black, dark brown and yellow.

== Distribution and habitat ==
The species occurs in Western Australia. The type locality is 15.5 km north of Eurardy Homestead, on the North West Coastal Highway.

== Behaviour ==
The adults are flying mellivores. Flowering plants visited by the bees include Calytrix formosa, Calytrix strigosa, Pileanthus peduncularis and Melaleuca species.

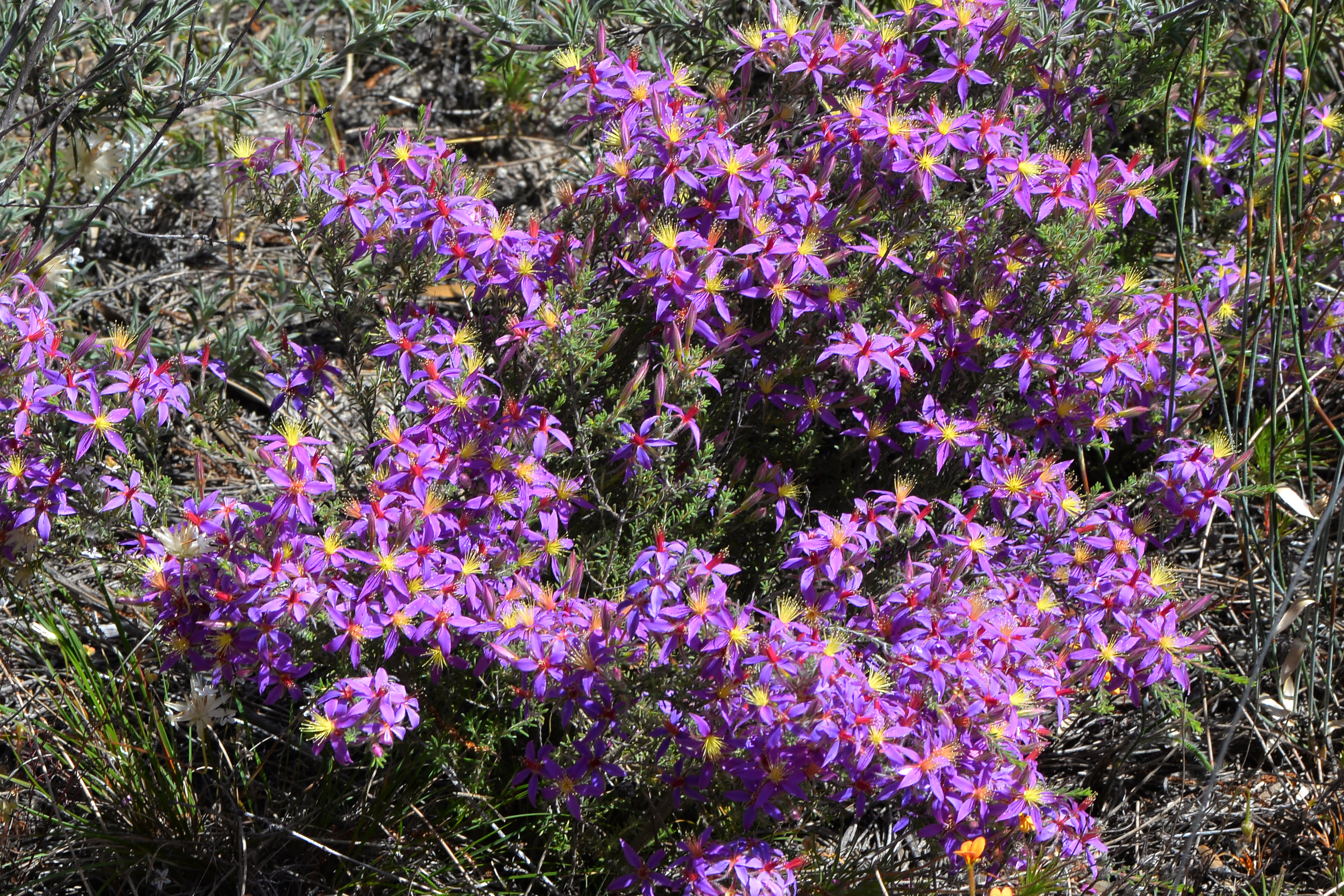
Calytrix strigosa, a forage plant of the bees
