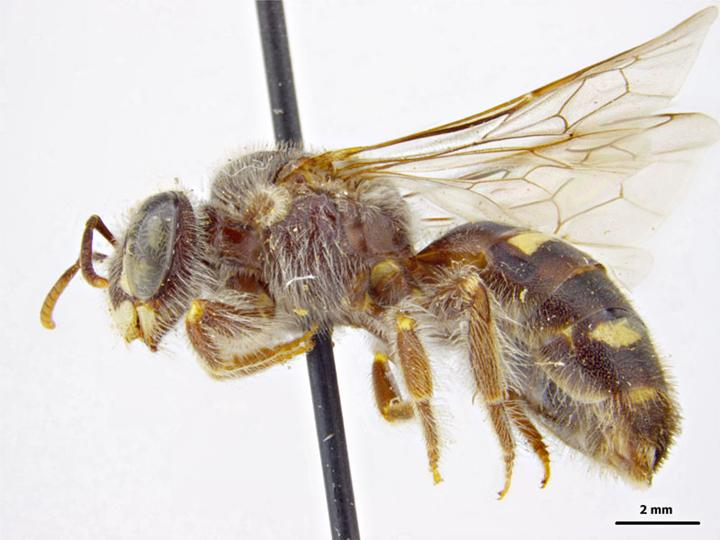
- Female

Scientific classification
- Kingdom: Animalia
- Phylum: Arthropoda
- Clade: Pancrustacea
- Class: Insecta
- Order: Hymenoptera
- Family: Colletidae
- Genus: Euhesma
- Species: E. evansi

Binomial name
- Euhesma evansi Exley, 2002

= Euhesma evansi =

Species of bee

Euhesma evansi, or Euhesma (Euhesma) evansi, is a species of bee in the family Colletidae and the subfamily Euryglossinae. It is endemic to Australia. It was described in 2002 by Australian entomologist Elizabeth Exley.

== Etymology ==
The specific epithet evansi honours Exley’s friend, entomologist Howard Ensign Evans, a collector of this species.

== Description ==
The body length of females is 10–11 mm, wing length 7 mm; male body length is 7 mm, wing length 4 mm. Colouration is mainly black, dark brown and yellow.

== Distribution and habitat ==
The species occurs in Western Australia. The type locality is Nilemah Station, 80 km south of Denham, in the Gascoyne region.

== Behaviour ==
The adults are flying mellivores. Flowering plants visited by the bees include Calytrix formosa, Baeckea pentagonantha, Baeckea blackallii, Phymatocarpus porphyrocephalus, Pileanthus peduncularis, Eremaea violacea, as well as Leptospermum and Melaleuca species.

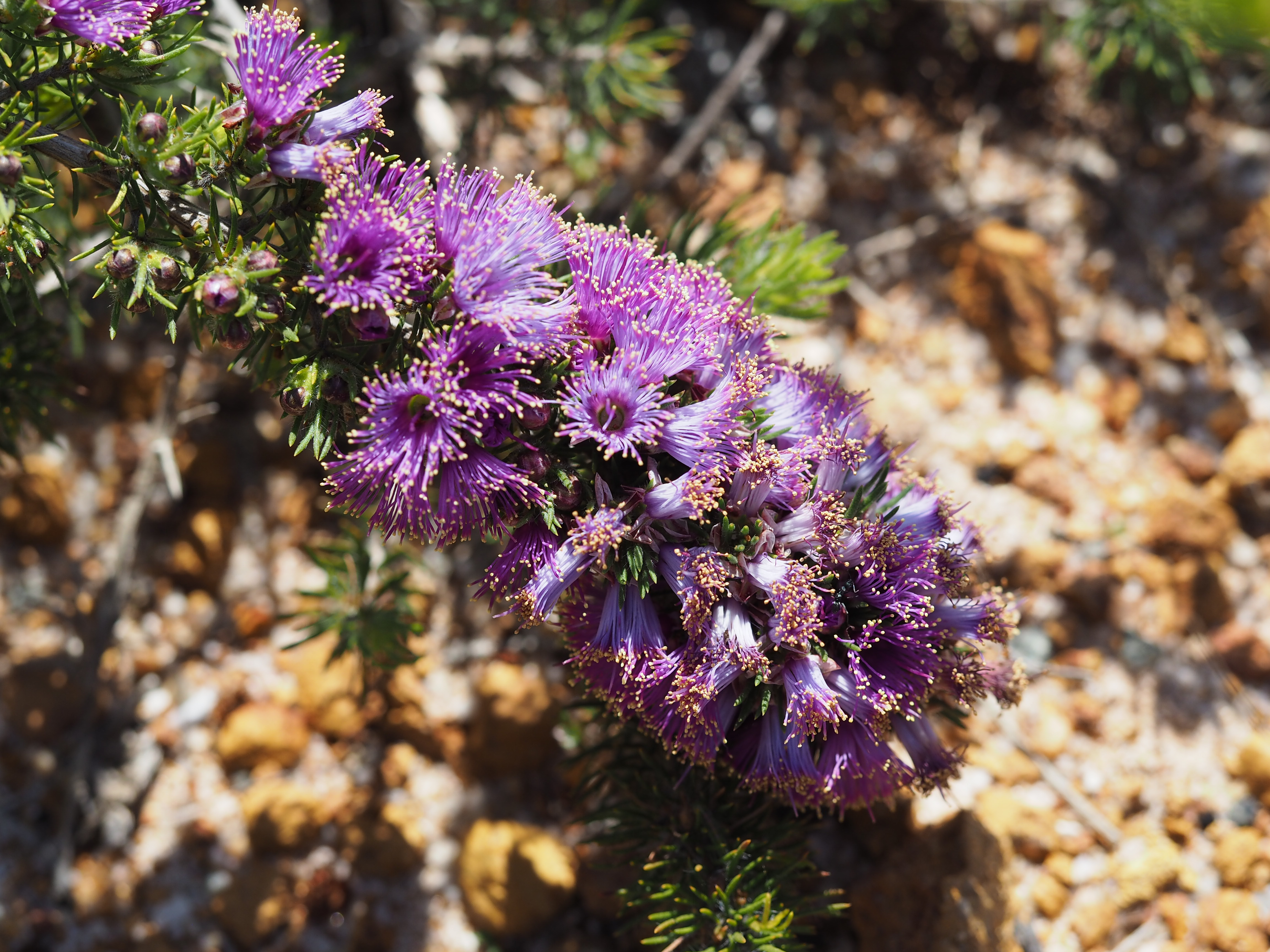
Eremaea violacea, a forage plant of the bees
