= Phymatocarpus interioris =

Scientific classification
- Kingdom: Plantae
- Clade: Tracheophytes
- Clade: Angiosperms
- Clade: Eudicots
- Clade: Rosids
- Order: Myrtales
- Family: Myrtaceae
- Genus: Phymatocarpus
- Species: P. interioris

Binomial name
- Phymatocarpus interioris Craven

Synonyms
- Melaleuca lepschii Craven & R.D.Edwards

Species of flowering plant

Phymatocarpus interioris is a plant in the myrtle family, Myrtaceae and is endemic to the south-west of Western Australia. It resembles many small species of Melaleuca, mainly differing in the way its anthers are attached at the top of the stamens. In Phymatocarpus they are attached at their base and open at the other end through two slits. It is a shrub with many small heads of pink to purple flowers fading to white, often covering the plant for several weeks in spring. It is most closely related to Phymatocarpus porphyrocephalus and was only recognised as a new species in 1999.

== Description ==
Phymatocarpus interioris is an erect to spreading shrub which sometimes grows to a height and width of 2 m (7 ft). The leaves are arranged alternately and are 4.4–9.2 mm (0.2–0.4 in) long and 3.0–7.5 mm (0.1–0.3 in) long. They are broadly egg-shaped and have 5 to 9 veins.

The flowers are pink to purple and are arranged in dense, roughly spherical heads containing 2 to 6 groups of flowers in threes, on the ends of branches which continue to grow after flowering. Unlike those of Phymatocarpus porphyrocephalus there are no bracts at the base of flowers. The flowers have 5 sepals, 5 petals and 23 to 30 stamens (compared to the 46 to 71 of P. porphyrocephalus. The stamens are joined in a continuous ring around the edge of each flower. Flowering usually occurs from September to November and is followed by fruit which are woody capsules. The capsules are arranged in spherical clusters which are rough or lumpy on the outer surface.

== Taxonomy and naming ==
Phymatocarpus interioris was described in 1999 by Craven in Muelleria.

== Distribution and habitat ==
Phymatocarpus interioris occurs in and between the Lake King and Peak Charles districts in the Mallee biogeographic region. It grows in sandy soil.

== Conservation ==
Phymatocarpus interioris is classified as "not threatened" by the Western Australian Government Department of Parks and Wildlife.
