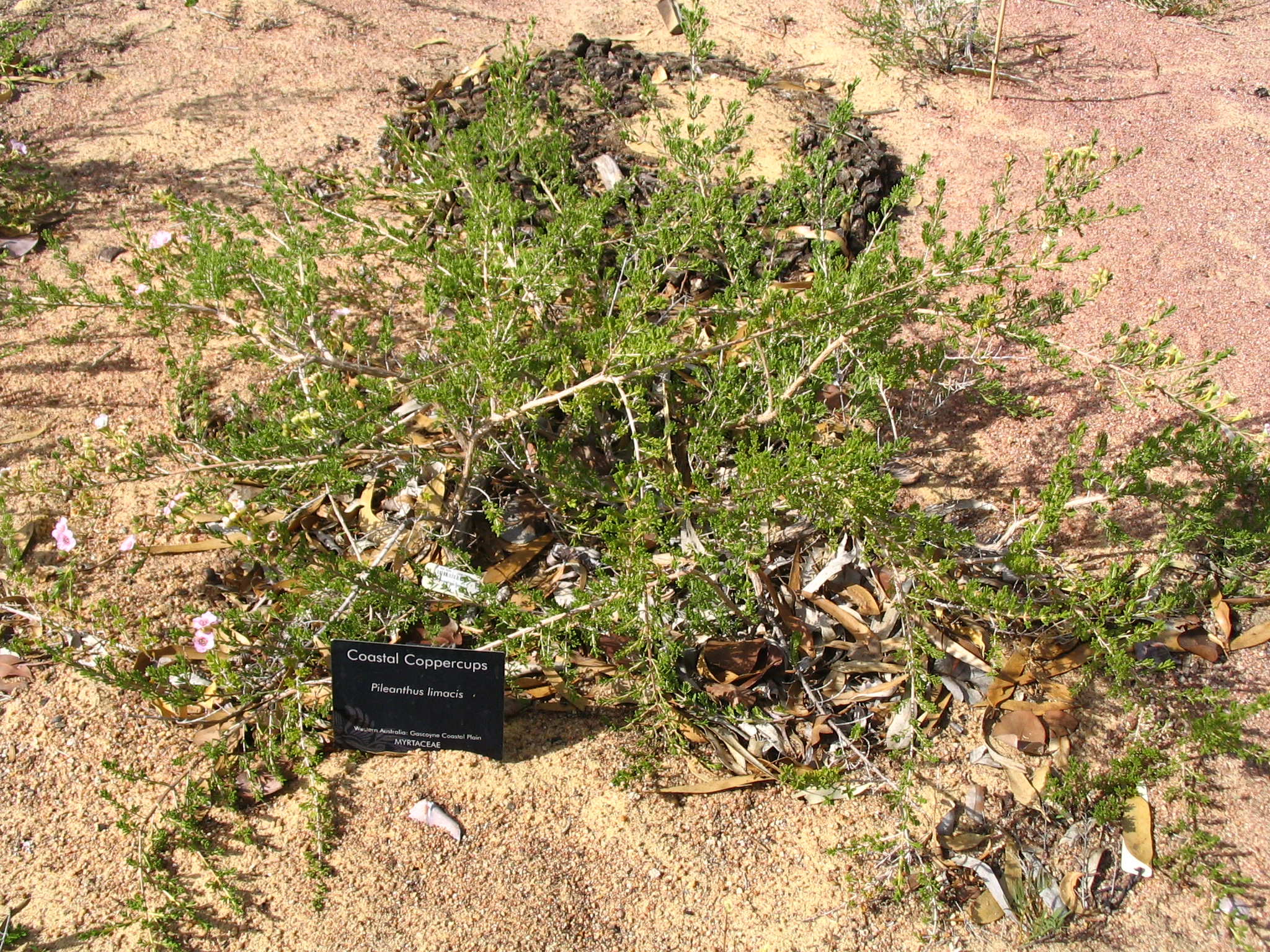

Scientific classification
- Kingdom: Plantae
- Clade: Tracheophytes
- Clade: Angiosperms
- Clade: Eudicots
- Clade: Rosids
- Order: Myrtales
- Family: Myrtaceae
- Genus: Pileanthus
- Species: P. limacis

Binomial name
- Pileanthus limacis Labill.

= Pileanthus limacis =

Coastal coppercups

Species of flowering plant

Pileanthus limacis, commonly known as coastal coppercups, is a plant species of the family Myrtaceae endemic to Western Australia.

The low spreading to prostrate shrub typically grows to a height of 0.8 metres (2.6 ft). It blooms between July and October producing white to pink flowers.

It is found on coastal sand dunes in the Gascoyne and Pilbara regions of Western Australia, between Shark Bay and Ashburton, where it grows in sandy soils over limestone.

The species was first formally described by the botanist Jacques Labillardière in 1806 in the work Novae Hollandiae Plantarum Specimen.
