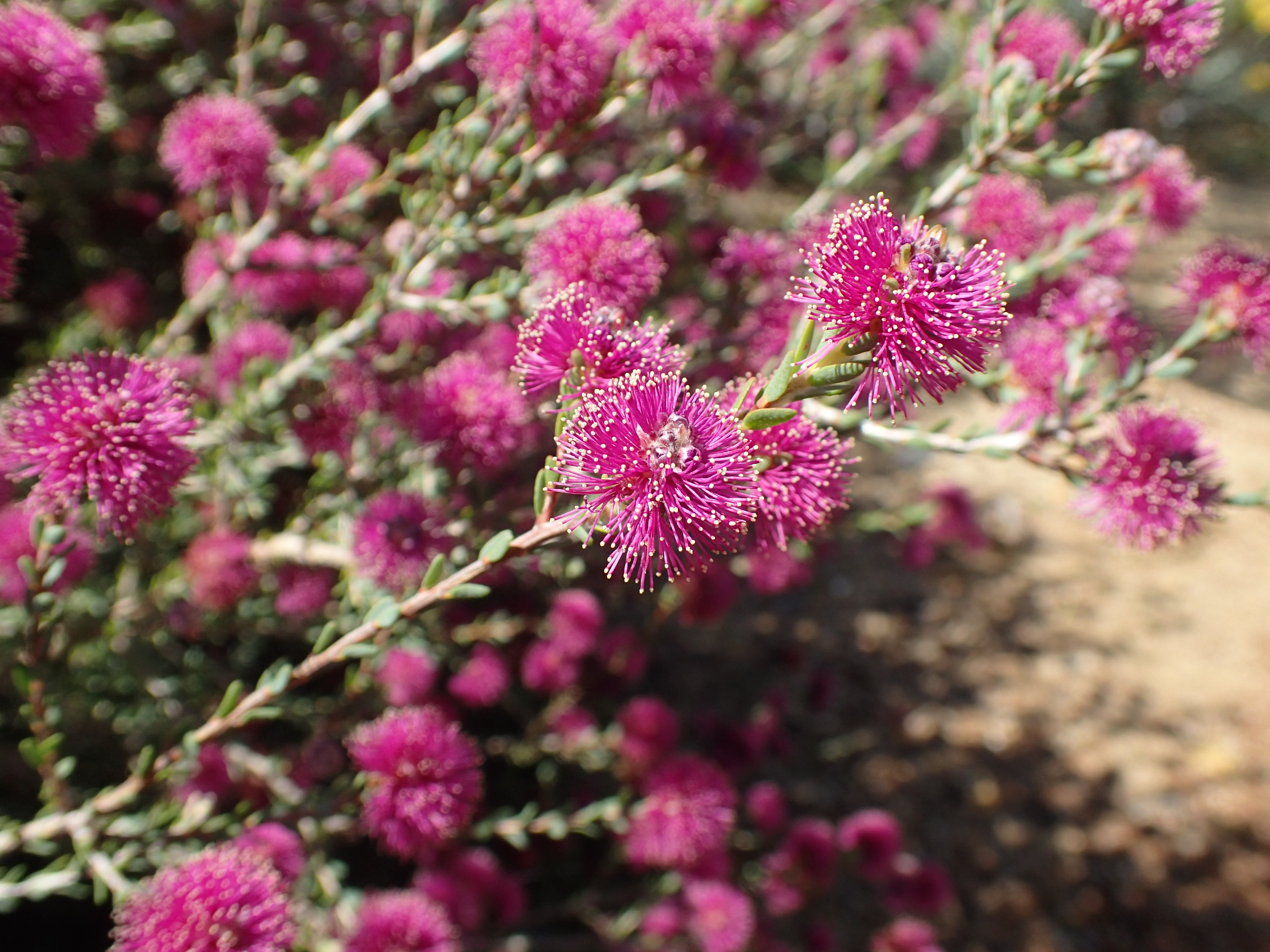
- Phymatocarpus maxwellii growing in Kings Park, Perth

Scientific classification
- Kingdom: Plantae
- Clade: Tracheophytes
- Clade: Angiosperms
- Clade: Eudicots
- Clade: Rosids
- Order: Myrtales
- Family: Myrtaceae
- Subfamily: Myrtoideae
- Tribe: Melaleuceae
- Genus: Phymatocarpus; F.Muell.

= Phymatocarpus =

Genus of flowering plants

Phymatocarpus is a genus of flowering plants in the family Myrtaceae and is endemic to the south-west of Western Australia. All three species are shrubs with pink to purple flowers.

== Description ==
Plants in the genus Phymatocarpus are shrubs which grow to a height of 1–3 metres (3–10 ft). Their leaves are small and are dotted with oil glands. The flowers are arranged in almost spherical heads on the ends of the branches and have 5 oval sepals, 5 petals and up to 75 stamens. The stamens are in a ring around the hypanthium, but above the ring are joined in 5 bundles. The stamens are all longer than the petals and give the flowers their pink to purple colour. The fruit is a woody capsule.

== Taxonomy and naming ==
The genus was first described in 1862 by the Victorian government botanist, Ferdinand von Mueller in Fragmenta Phytographiae Australiae. The first species he described was Phymatocarpus porphyrocephalus. The name Phymatocarpus is derived from the Ancient Greek phymatos (plural of phyma) meaning "tubercle" or "swelling" and καρπός (karpós) meaning "fruit" in reference to the fruiting capsules being lumpy.

The three species are:

- Phymatocarpus interioris Craven
- Phymatocarpus maxwellii F.Muell.
- Phymatocarpus porphyrocephalus F.Muell.

== Distribution and habitat ==
All three species of Phymatocarpus occur in sandy soils in the south-west of Western Australia.

== Conservation ==
All species of Phymatocarpus are classified as "not threatened" by the Government of Western Australia Department of Parks and Wildlife.
