= Pileanthus septentrionalis =

Scientific classification
- Kingdom: Plantae
- Clade: Tracheophytes
- Clade: Angiosperms
- Clade: Eudicots
- Clade: Rosids
- Order: Myrtales
- Family: Myrtaceae
- Genus: Pileanthus
- Species: P. septentrionalis

Binomial name
- Pileanthus septentrionalis Keighery

Species of shrub

Pileanthus septentrionalis is a plant species of the family Myrtaceae endemic to Western Australia.

The spreading and open shrub typically grows to a height of 1.5 metres (4.9 ft). It blooms between August and October producing white flowers.

It is found on sand dunes in the Gascoyne and Pilbara regions of Western Australia around Northampton where it grows in sandy-loamy soils.
