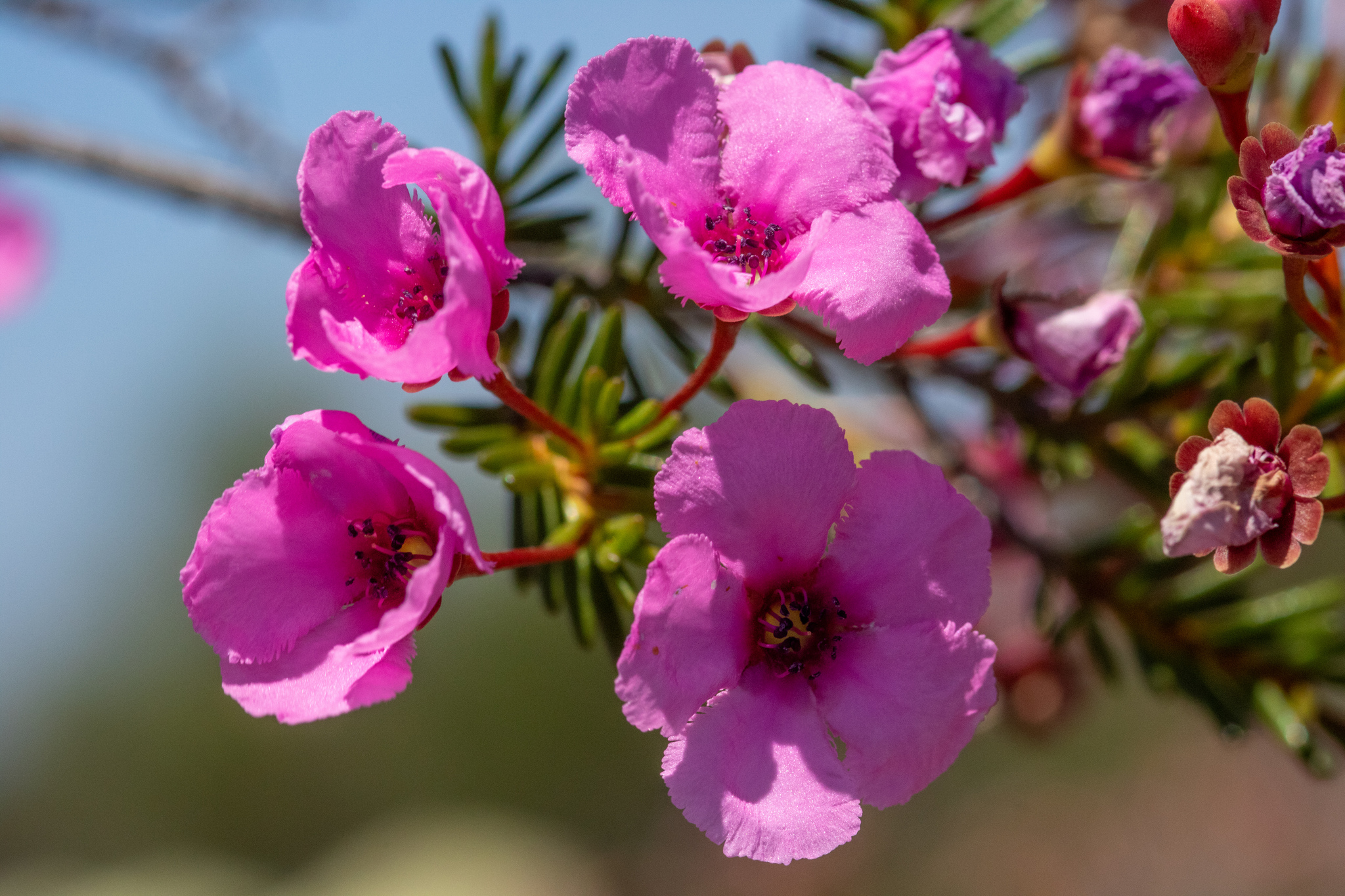

Conservation status
- Priority Three — Poorly Known Taxa (DEC)

Scientific classification
- Kingdom: Plantae
- Clade: Tracheophytes
- Clade: Angiosperms
- Clade: Eudicots
- Clade: Rosids
- Order: Myrtales
- Family: Myrtaceae
- Genus: Pileanthus
- Species: P. bellus

Binomial name
- Pileanthus bellus Keighery

= Pileanthus bellus =

Species of shrub

Pileanthus bellus is a species of plant in the family Myrtaceae that is endemic to Western Australia.

The erect shrub typically grows to a height of 3 metres (9.8 ft). It blooms between October and December producing pink flowers.

It is found on sand dune in the Gascoyne and Mid West regions of Western Australia near Northampton and Shark Bay where it grows in sandy soils over sandstone.
