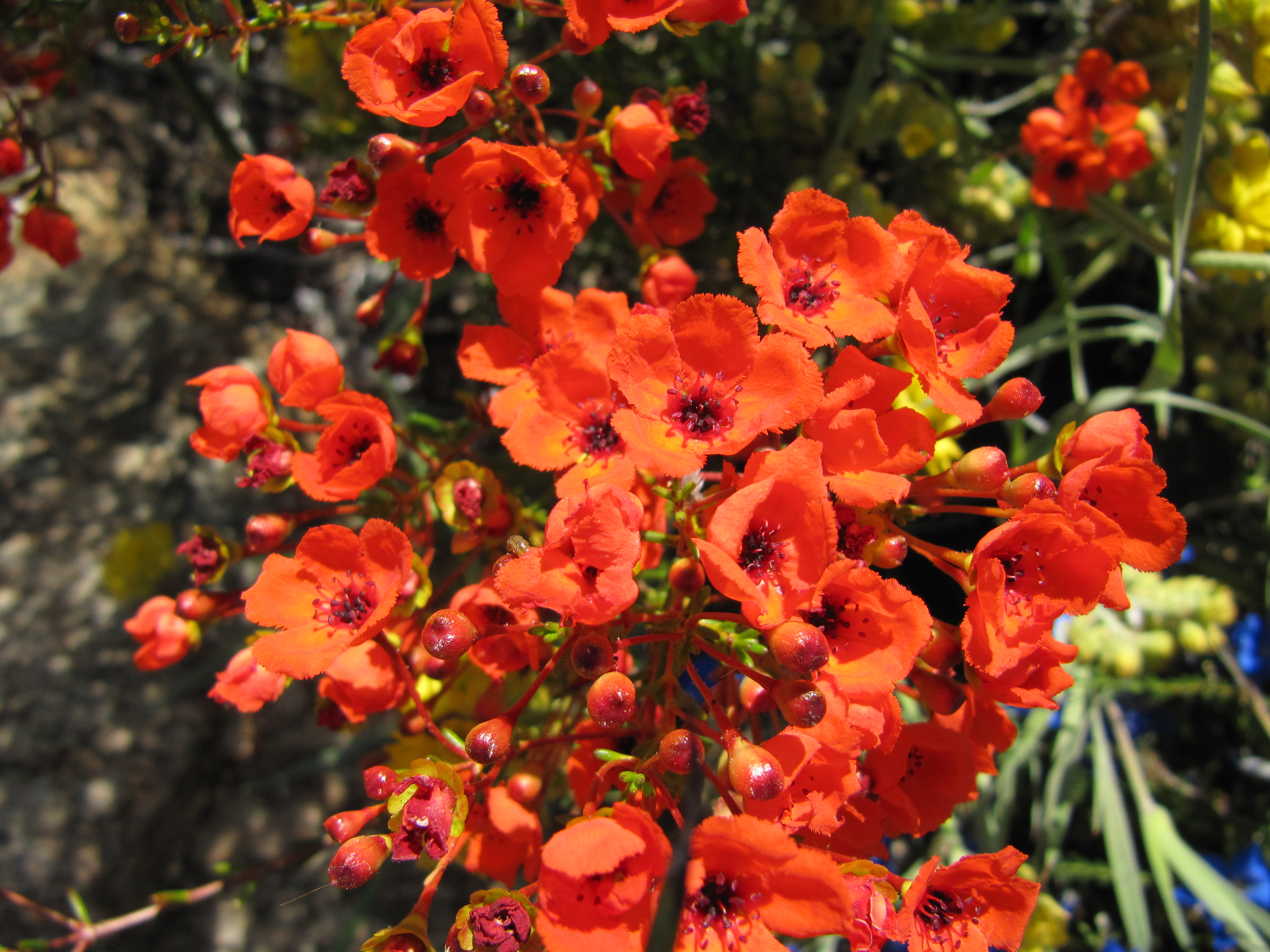

Scientific classification
- Kingdom: Plantae
- Clade: Tracheophytes
- Clade: Angiosperms
- Clade: Eudicots
- Clade: Rosids
- Order: Myrtales
- Family: Myrtaceae
- Subfamily: Myrtoideae
- Tribe: Chamelaucieae
- Genus: Pileanthus; Labill.

= Pileanthus =

Genus of flowering plants

Pileanthus is a genus of flowering plants in the family Myrtaceae, endemic to Western Australia. Collectively referred to by the common name coppercups, the eight currently recognised species are:

- Pileanthus aurantiacus
- Pileanthus bellus
- Pileanthus filifolius Meisn. summer coppercups
- Pileanthus limacis Labill. coastal coppercups
- Pileanthus peduncularis Endl. coppercups
- Pileanthus rubrinitidus
- Pileanthus septentrionalis
- Pileanthus vernicosus F.Muell.
