= Pileanthus rubrinitidus =

Scientific classification
- Kingdom: Plantae
- Clade: Embryophytes
- Clade: Tracheophytes
- Clade: Angiosperms
- Clade: Eudicots
- Clade: Rosids
- Order: Myrtales
- Family: Myrtaceae
- Genus: Pileanthus
- Species: P. rubrinitidus

Binomial name
- Pileanthus rubrinitidus Keighery

Species of shrub

Pileanthus rubrinitidus is a flowering plant in the family Myrtaceae and is endemic to the south-west of Western Australia. It is an erect shrub with brownish-red young branches, linear leaves triangular in cross section, and reddish-orange flowers.

== Description ==
Pileanthus rubrinitidus is an erect shrub that typically grows to a height of up to 1 m (3 ft 3 in) and has brownish-red young branches with prominent oil glands producing a sticky secretion. The leaves are linear, triangular in cross section, 5–13 mm (0.20–0.51 in) long and less than 1 mm (0.039 in) wide. There are large, red, stipule outgrowths at the base of the leaves. The flowers are borne on a thin, yellowish red peduncle 18–22 mm (0.71–0.87 in) long with a pair of narrowly top-shaped bracteoles 2–3 mm (0.079–0.118 in) long, the floral cup also top-shaped, 3–5 mm (0.12–0.20 in) long and 3–4 mm (0.12–0.16 in) wide. The five sepals are 2–4 mm (0.079–0.157 in) long and 3–4 mm (0.12–0.16 in) wide. Each flower is borne on a pedicel 2–4 mm (0.079–0.157 in) long and the petals are reddish-orange, 7–8 mm (0.28–0.31 in) long. Flowering occurs from late September to early November.

== Taxonomy ==
This species was first formally described in 2022 by Gregory John Keighery who gave it the name Pileanthus rubronitidus in the journal Nuytsia from specimens collected 4 km (2.5 mi) west-north-west of Yerina Spring in 1979. In 2019, Alex George noted in the Australian Systematic Botany Newsletter, that the specific epithet is derived from the Latin "ruber" meaning 'red and "nitidus" meaning 'shining' and the epithet should therefore be rubrinitus. In 2020, the epithet was corrected to rubrinitus in the journal Nuytsia.

== Distribution and habitat ==
Pileanthus rubrinitidus grows in sand in heath or Banksia sceptrum shrubland between Kalbarri and the west of Northampton in the Geraldton Sandplains and Murchison bioregions in the south-west of Western Australia.

== Conservation status ==
Pileanthus rubrinitidus is listed as "not threatened" by the Government of Western Australia Department of Biodiversity, Conservation and Attractions.
