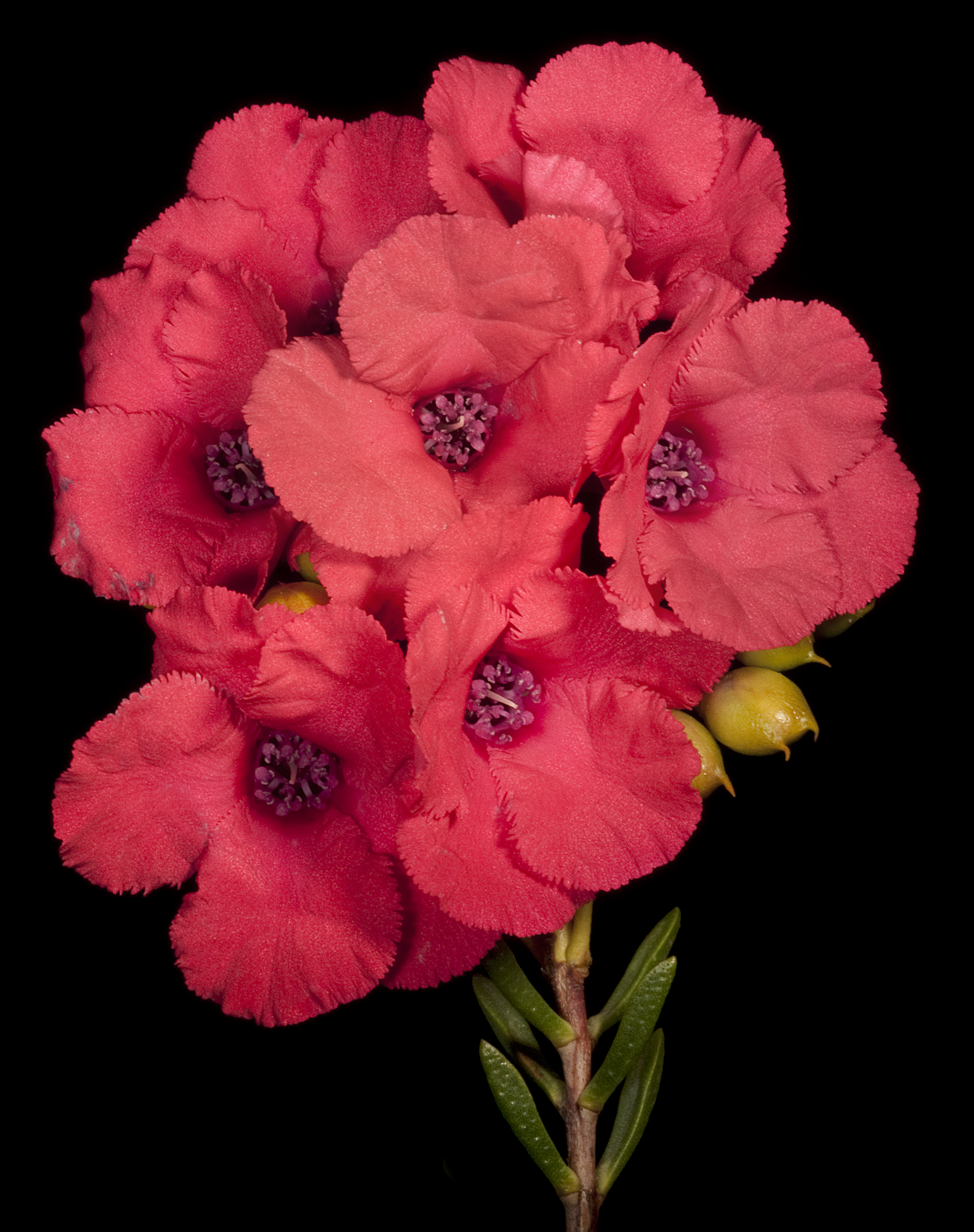

Scientific classification
- Kingdom: Plantae
- Clade: Tracheophytes
- Clade: Angiosperms
- Clade: Eudicots
- Clade: Rosids
- Order: Myrtales
- Family: Myrtaceae
- Genus: Pileanthus
- Species: P. filifolius

Binomial name
- Pileanthus filifolius Meisn.

= Pileanthus filifolius =

Species of flowering plant

Pileanthus filifolius, commonly known as summer coppercups, is a plant species of the family Myrtaceae endemic to Western Australia.

The loose and erect shrub typically grows to a height of 1 metre (3.3 ft). It blooms between November and January producing pink-red flowers.

It is found on sand plains in the Mid West, Wheatbelt and Swan Coastal Plain regions of Western Australia between Northampton and Gingin where it grows in sandy soils over laterite.
