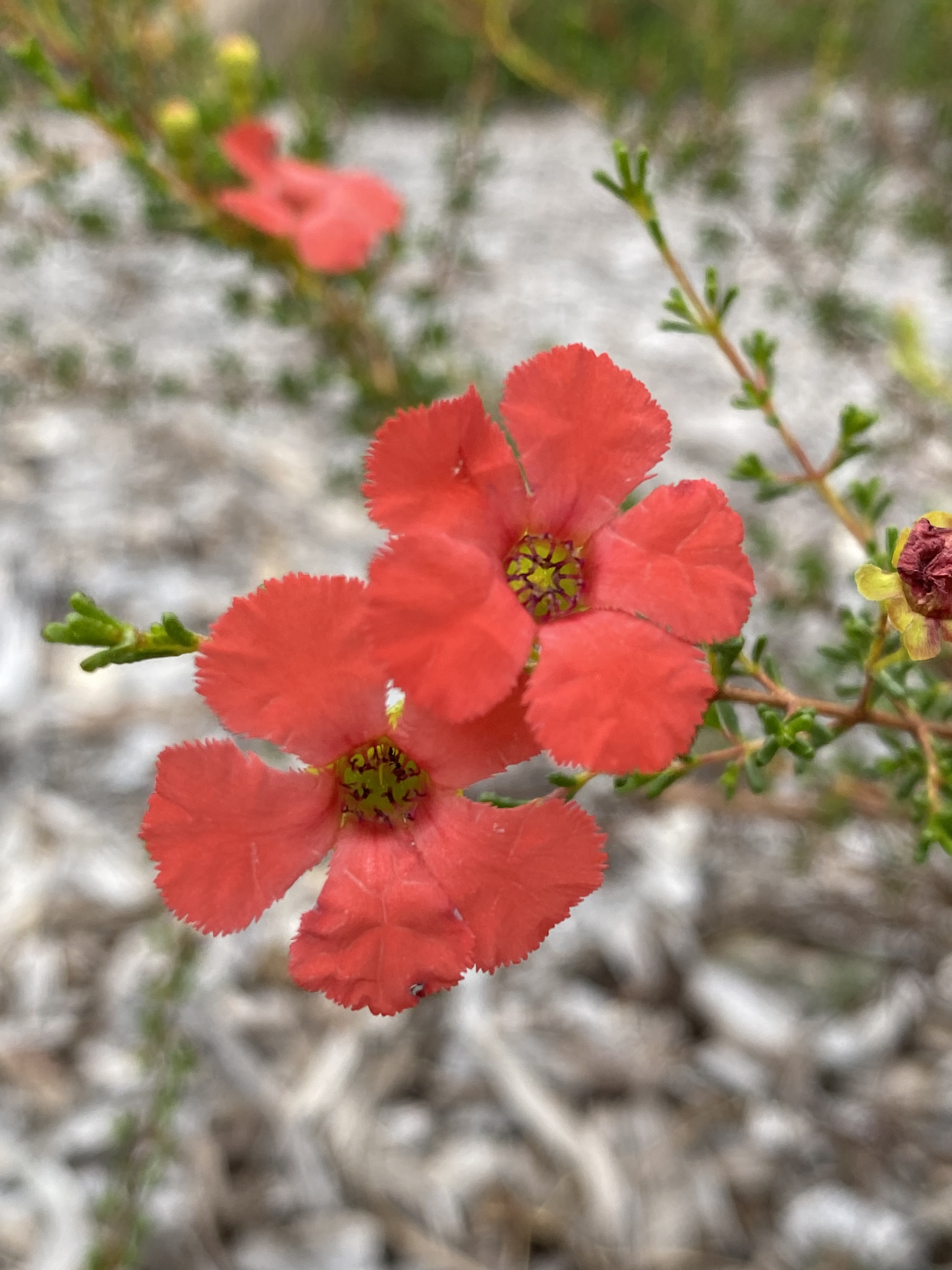

Scientific classification
- Kingdom: Plantae
- Clade: Tracheophytes
- Clade: Angiosperms
- Clade: Eudicots
- Clade: Rosids
- Order: Myrtales
- Family: Myrtaceae
- Genus: Pileanthus
- Species: P. vernicosus

Binomial name
- Pileanthus vernicosus F.Muell.

= Pileanthus vernicosus =

Species of shrub

Pileanthus vernicosus is a plant species of the family Myrtaceae endemic to Western Australia.

The upright and slender shrub typically grows to a height of 1 metre (3.3 ft). It blooms between September and November producing red flowers. The woody shrub has prominent oil glands and lives between 5 and 10 years. The twiggy branchlets are covered in small hardy evergreen leaves.

It is found on sand dunes and plains amongst coastal heath in the Gascoyne and Mid West regions of Western Australia between Shark Bay and Geraldton, where it grows in sandy soils.
