= Pileanthus aurantiacus =

Conservation status
- Priority One — Poorly Known Taxa (DEC)

Scientific classification
- Kingdom: Plantae
- Clade: Tracheophytes
- Clade: Angiosperms
- Clade: Eudicots
- Clade: Rosids
- Order: Myrtales
- Family: Myrtaceae
- Genus: Pileanthus
- Species: P. aurantiacus

Binomial name
- Pileanthus aurantiacus Keighery

Species of shrub

Pileanthus aurantiacus is a plant species of the family Myrtaceae endemic to Western Australia.

The upright woody shrub typically grows to a height of 2 metres (6.6 ft). It blooms in October producing orange flowers.

It is found on flats, sand plains and dune slopes in the Mid West region of Western Australia near Northampton where it grows in sandy soils over limestone.
