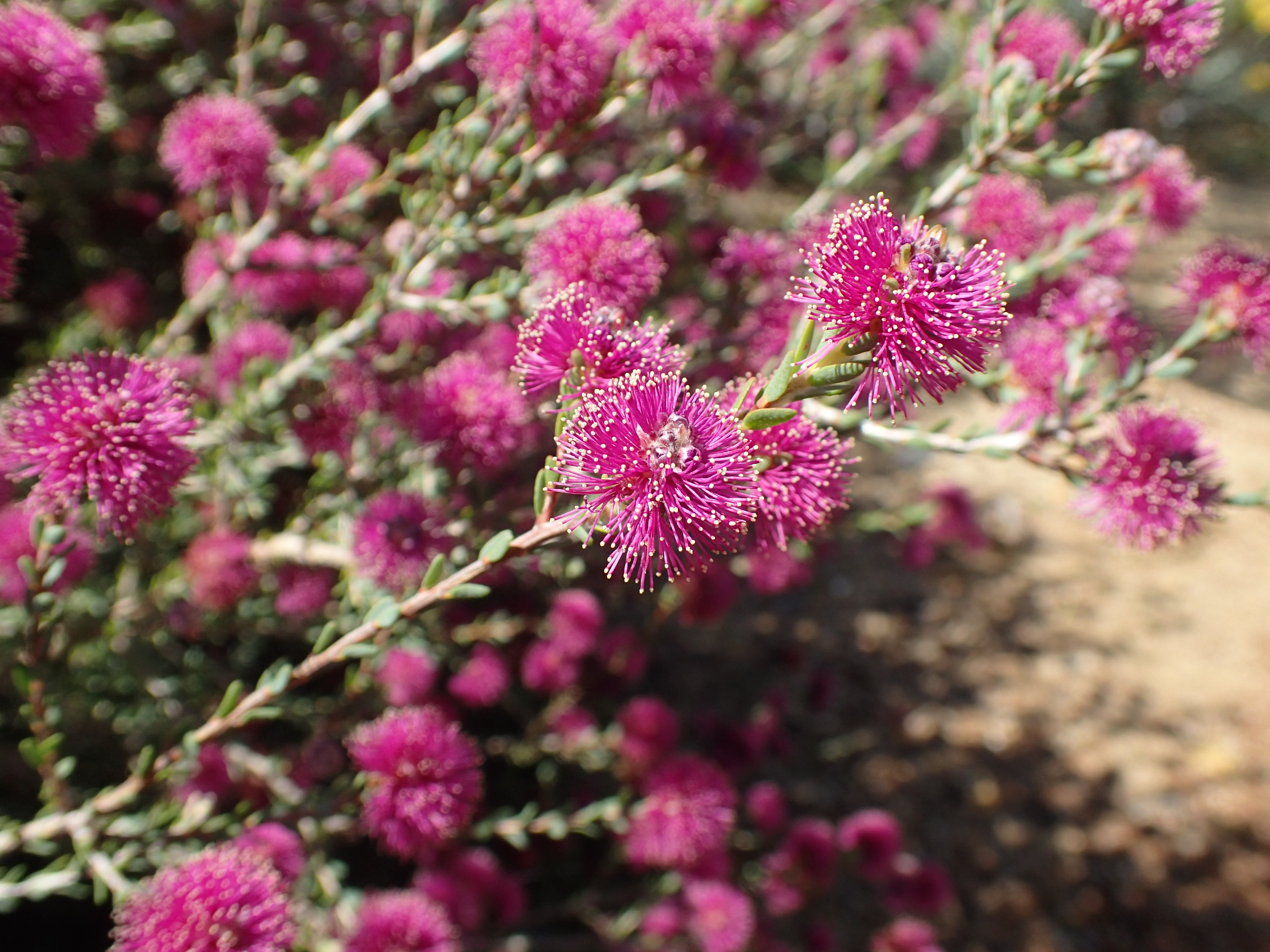
- Phymatocarpus maxwellii growing in Kings Park, Perth

Scientific classification
- Kingdom: Plantae
- Clade: Tracheophytes
- Clade: Angiosperms
- Clade: Eudicots
- Clade: Rosids
- Order: Myrtales
- Family: Myrtaceae
- Genus: Phymatocarpus
- Species: P. maxwellii

Binomial name
- Phymatocarpus maxwellii F.Muell.

Synonyms
- Melaleuca maxwellii (F.Muell.) Craven & R.D.Edwards

= Phymatocarpus maxwellii =

Species of flowering plant

Phymatocarpus maxwellii is a plant in the myrtle family, Myrtaceae and is endemic to the south-west of Western Australia. It resembles many small species of Melaleuca, mainly differing in the way its anthers are attached at the top of the stamens. In Phymatocarpus they are attached at their base and open at the other end through two slits. It is a shrub with many small heads of pink to purple flowers, often covering the plant for several weeks in October.

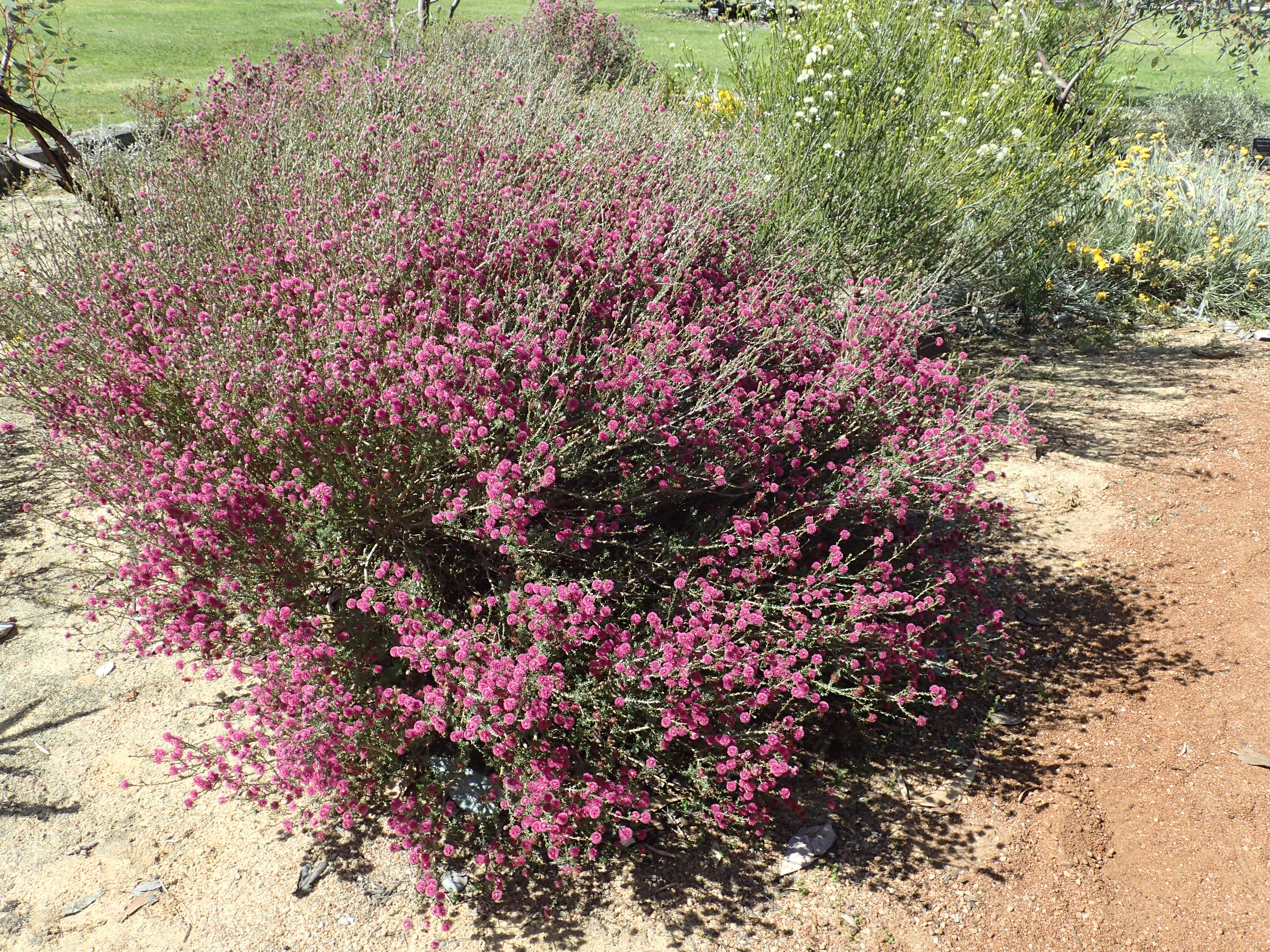
Phymatocarpus maxwellii habit

== Description ==
Phymatocarpus maxwellii is an erect to spreading shrub which sometimes grows to a height and width of 2.5 metres (8 ft). The leaves are broad egg-shaped, 4–6 millimetres (0.2–0.2 in) long, often curved and stiff but not prickly.

The flowers are pink to purple and are arranged in dense, roughly spherical heads about 10 millimetres (0.4 in) in diameter on the ends of branches which continue to grow after flowering. There are 5 sepals, 5 petals and 5 bundles of stamens. It can be distinguished from the other two species of Phymatocarpus by it lack of a ring of stamens - both the others have the stamens joined in a ring at their bases. Flowering occurs from August to November and is followed by fruits which are woody capsules. The individual capsules are about 2.5 millimetres (0.1 in) in diameter and are arranged in clusters which are rough or lumpy on the outer surface.

== Taxonomy and naming ==
Phymatocarpus maxwellii was first formally described in 1875 by Ferdinand von Mueller in Fragmenta Phytographiae Australiae. The specific epithet (maxwellii) honours the botanical collector George Maxwell, the collector of the type specimen.

== Distribution and habitat ==
Phymatocarpus maxwellii occurs in and between the Mount Barker East and the Israelite Bay districts in the Coolgardie, Esperance Plains and Mallee biogeographic regions. It grows in a wide range of situations but mostly in sand on sandplains and depressions that are wet in winter.

== Conservation ==
Phymatocarpus maxwellii is classified as "not threatened" by the Western Australian government Department of Parks and Wildlife.
