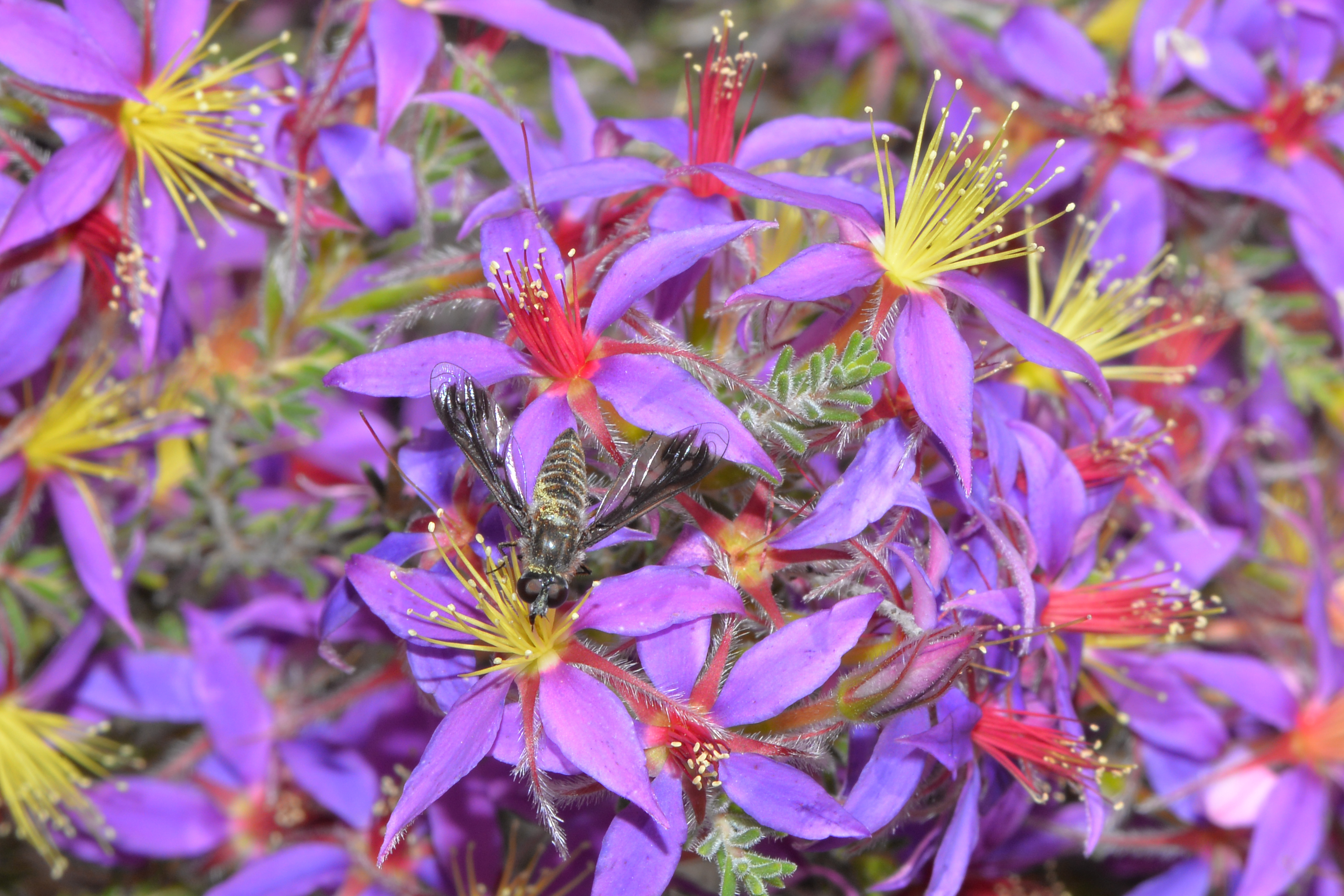
- With a bee fly (Aleucosia tridentata)

Scientific classification
- Kingdom: Plantae
- Clade: Tracheophytes
- Clade: Angiosperms
- Clade: Eudicots
- Clade: Rosids
- Order: Myrtales
- Family: Myrtaceae
- Genus: Calytrix
- Species: C. strigosa

Binomial name
- Calytrix strigosa A.Cunn.

Synonyms
- Calycothrix lasiantha Meisn.; Calycothrix strigosa (A.Cunn.) Schauer; Calythrix lasiantha Benth. nom. inval., pro syn.; Calythrix strigosa A.Cunn. orth. var.

= Calytrix strigosa =

Species of flowering plant

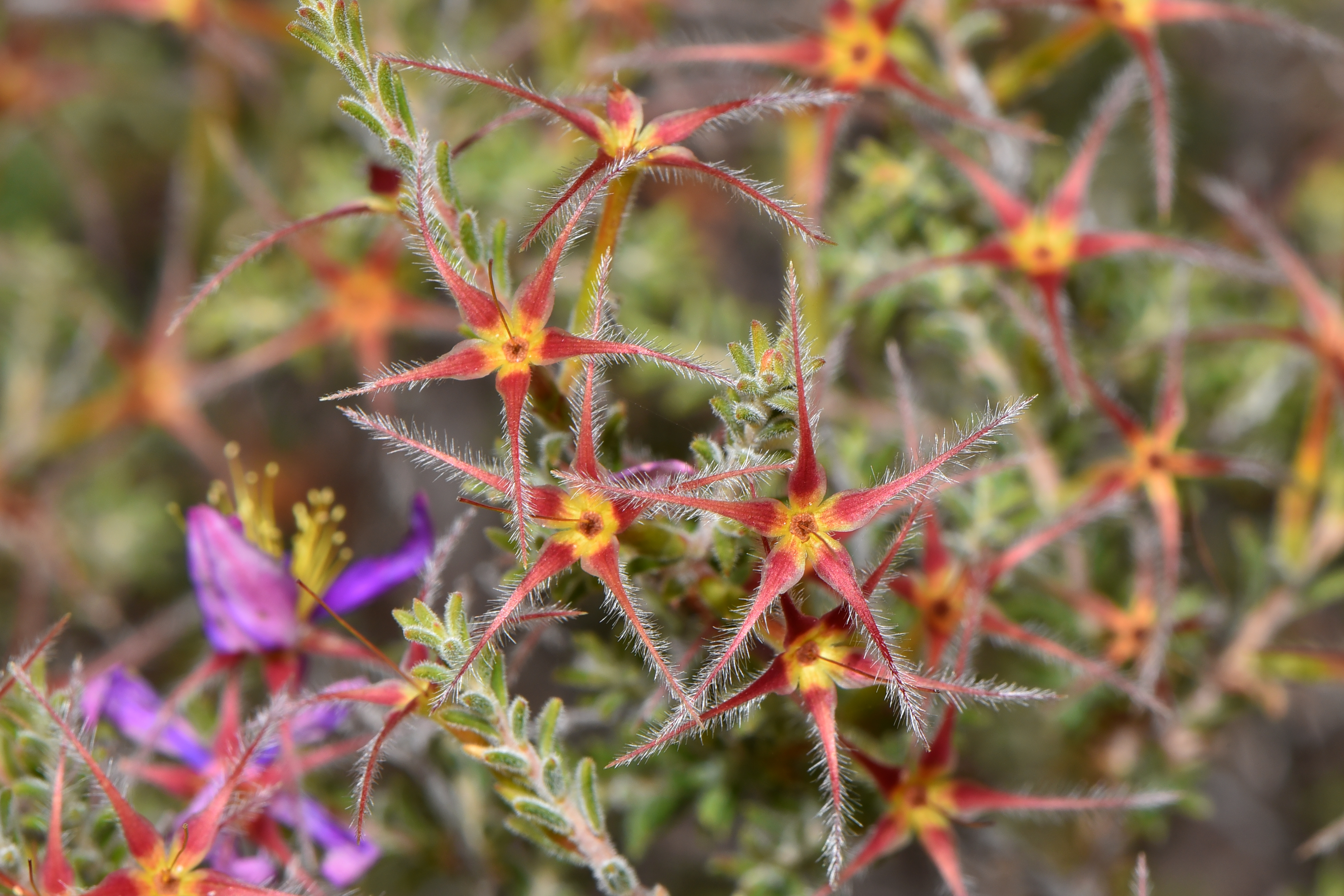
Sepals after flowering

Calytrix strigosa is a species of flowering plant in the myrtle family Myrtaceae and is endemic to near-coastal areas of the south-west of Western Australia. It is a semi-prostrate shrub with linear, elliptic, lance-shaped or round leaves, and pale pink, mauve to purple flowers with about 30 to 70 stamens in several rows.

== Description ==
Calytrix strigosa is a semi-prostrate shrub that typically grows to a height of 1.6 m (5 ft 3 in) and has branchlets sometimes covered with soft hairs. Its leaves are linear, elliptic, lance-shaped or round, 1–7 mm (0.039–0.276 in) long and 0.5–2.2 mm (0.020–0.087 in) wide on a petiole 0.2–1 mm (0.0079–0.0394 in) long. There are stipules up to 0.4 mm (0.016 in) long at the base of the leaves. The flowers are borne on a funnel-shaped peduncle 3–11 mm (0.12–0.43 in) long with elliptic to egg-shaped lobes with the narrower end towards the base, 2–8 mm (0.079–0.315 in) long. The floral tube is spindle-shaped, 4.5–14 mm (0.18–0.55 in) long and has five ribs. The sepals are fused at the base for up to 0.2 mm (0.0079 in), with elliptic to round lobes 1.0–2.5 mm (0.039–0.098 in) long and 1–2 mm (0.039–0.079 in) wide, with an awn up to 11 mm (0.43 in) long. The petals are pale pink, mauve to purple with a yellow base or whitish base, or pale yellow throughout, elliptic to egg-shaped, 4–11 mm (0.16–0.43 in) long and 1.8–4 mm (0.071–0.157 in) wide, and there are about 30 to 70 stamens in two or three rows. Flowering occurs in most months with a peak from August to November.

== Taxonomy ==
Calytrix strigosa was first formally described in 1834 by Alan Cunningham in Hooker's Botanical Magazine from specimens he collected on Dirk Hartog Island in 1822. The specific epithet, (strigosa), is a Botanical Latin adjective describing the sepals of the plant as having "straight, rigid, close-pressed, rather short bristle-like hairs".

== Distribution and habitat ==
This species of Calytrix is found on sand dunes and sand plains in the south-west of Western Australia from Shark Bay to near Perth and inland to a line between Wiluna and the Fraser Range in the Avon Wheatbelt, Carnarvon, Geraldton Sandplains, Jarrah Forest, Swan Coastal Plain and Yalgoo, where it grows in heath on sand and limestone, laterite and clay soils.

== Conservation status ==
Calytrix strigosa is listed as "not threatened" by the Government of Western Australia Department of Biodiversity, Conservation and Attractions.
