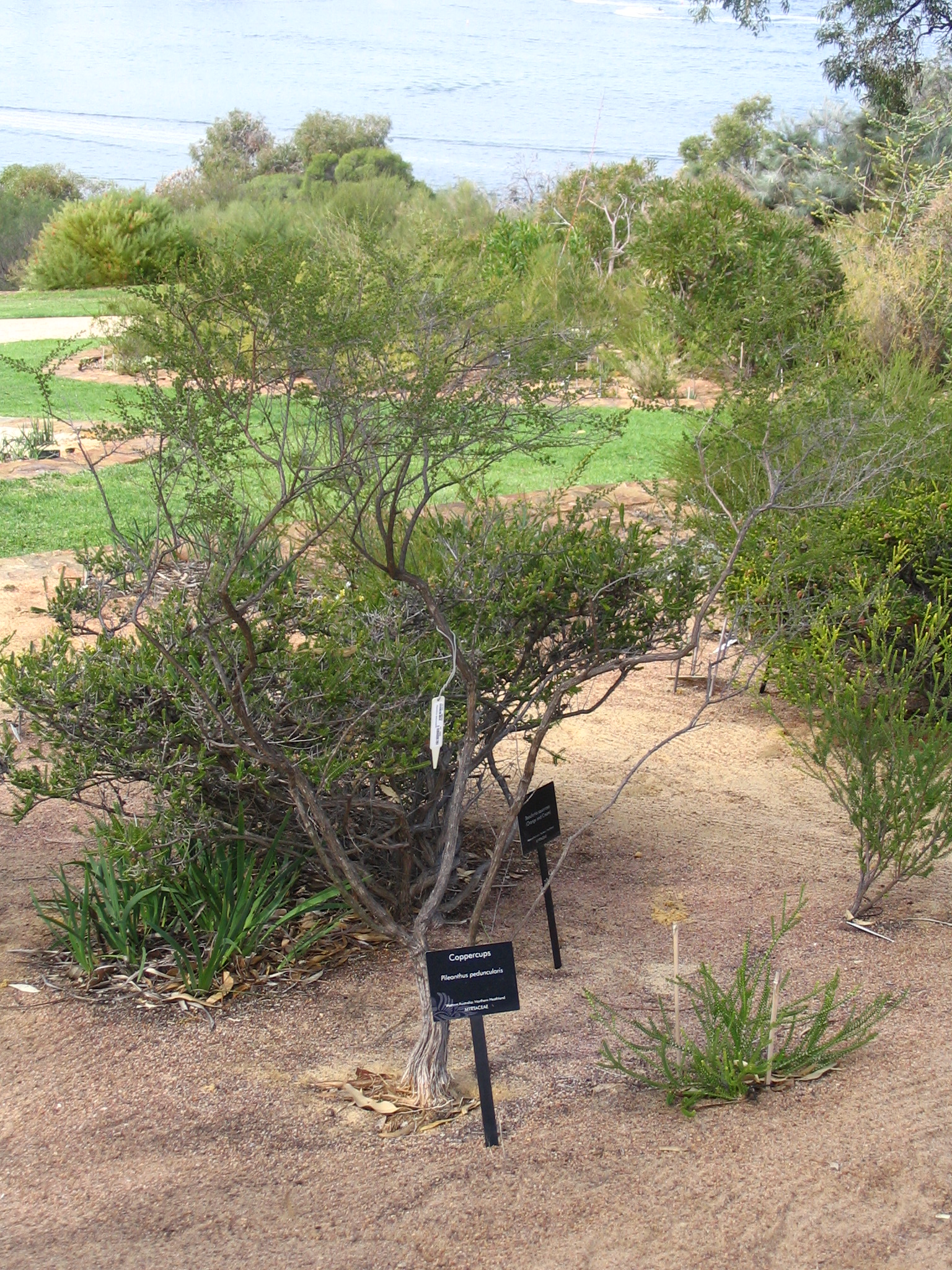

Scientific classification
- Kingdom: Plantae
- Clade: Tracheophytes
- Clade: Angiosperms
- Clade: Eudicots
- Clade: Rosids
- Order: Myrtales
- Family: Myrtaceae
- Genus: Pileanthus
- Species: P. peduncularis

Binomial name
- Pileanthus peduncularis Endl.

= Pileanthus peduncularis =

Coppercups

Species of flowering plant

Pileanthus peduncularis, commonly known as coppercups, is a plant species of the family Myrtaceae endemic to Western Australia.

The low and spreading shrub typically grows to a height of 1.5 metres (4.9 ft). It blooms between August and December producing copper-orange to red flowers which occur in a massed display. The flowers are large with five-petals that occur towards the ends of the branches and from the leaf axils. The flowers are approximately 18 to 22 millimetres (0.71 to 0.87 in) in diameter. The evergreen leaves are small and linear leaves and about 4 mm (0.16 in) long.

The species was first formally described by the botanist Stephan Endlicher in 1838 as part of the work Stirpium Australasicarum Herbarii Hugeliani Decades Tres The only known synonym is Chamelaucium dilatatum.

It is found on sand plains and sand dunes in the Pilbara, Mid West, Wheatbelt and Swan Coastal Plain regions of Western Australia where it grows in sandy soils.

There are two recognised subspecies:

- Pileanthus peduncularis subsp. pilifer
- Pileanthus peduncularis subsp. peduncularis
