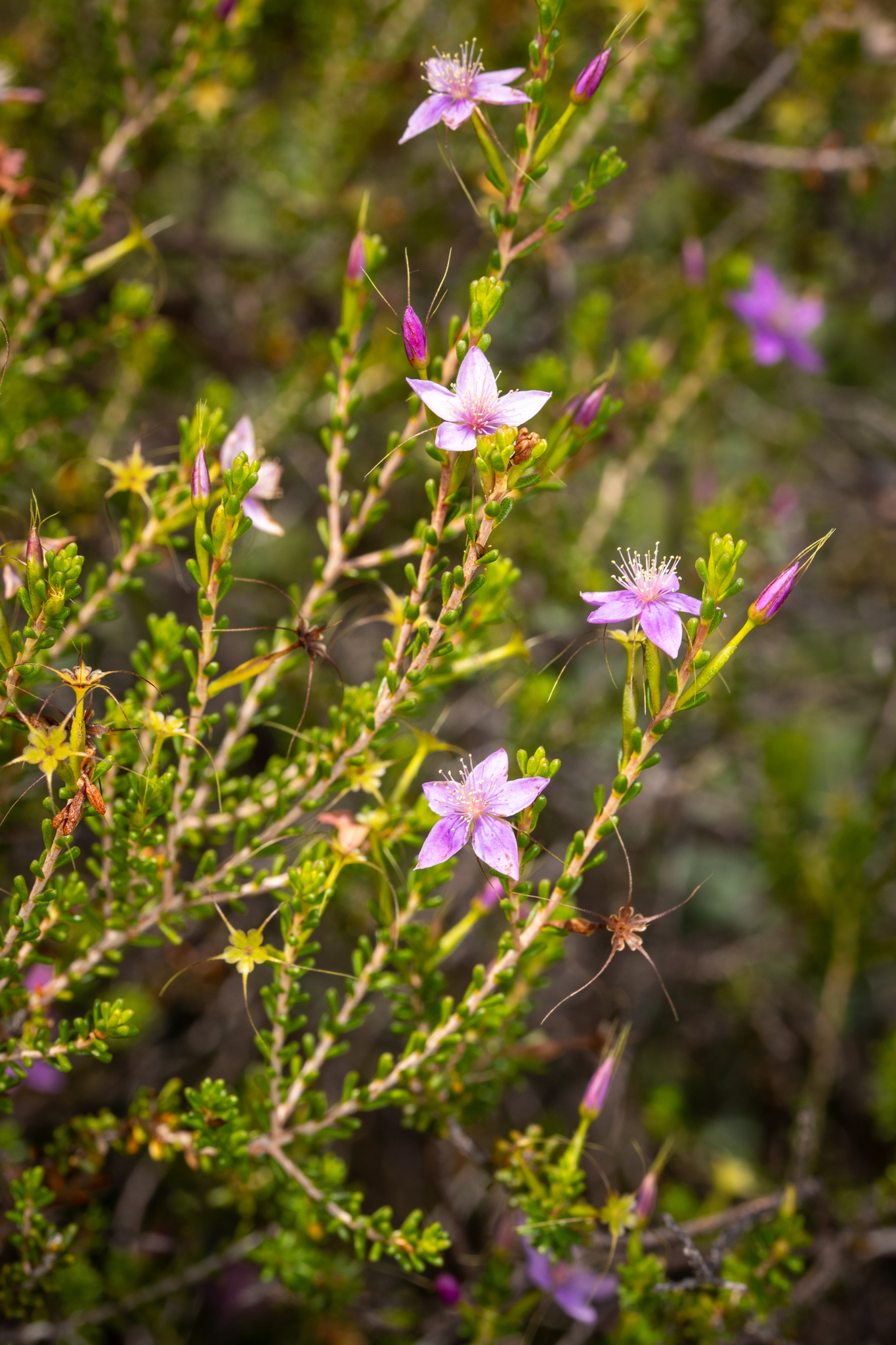

Conservation status
- Priority Three — Poorly Known Taxa (DEC)

Scientific classification
- Kingdom: Plantae
- Clade: Tracheophytes
- Clade: Angiosperms
- Clade: Eudicots
- Clade: Rosids
- Order: Myrtales
- Family: Myrtaceae
- Genus: Calytrix
- Species: C. formosa

Binomial name
- Calytrix formosa Craven

= Calytrix formosa =

Species of flowering plant

Calytrix formosa is a species of flowering plant in the myrtle family Myrtaceae and is endemic to the west of Western Australia. It is a glabrous shrub with erect, elliptic, broadly elliptic or oblong leaves, and pink flowers with about 90 to 105 stamens in multiple rows.

== Description ==
Calytrix formosa is a glabrous shrub that typically grows to a height of 30–80 cm (12–31 in). Its leaves are erect, elliptic, broadly elliptic or oblong, 1–2 mm (0.039–0.079 in) long, 0.6–1.2 mm (0.024–0.047 in) wide and sessile or on a petiole up to 0.25 mm (0.0098 in) long. There are stipules 0.25 mm (0.0098 in) long at the base of the petiole. The flowers are borne on a peduncle 4–6 mm (0.16–0.24 in) long with broadly egg-shaped lobes 1.0–1.5 mm (0.039–0.059 in) long. The floral tube is fused to the style, 12–17 mm (0.47–0.67 in) and has 10 ribs. The sepals are fused at the base, with broadly egg-shaped lobes 1.5–1.75 mm (0.059–0.069 in) long and 1.5–2.5 mm (0.059–0.098 in) long, with an awn long up to 18 mm (0.71 in) long. The petals are pink with a yellow base, lance-shaped to elliptic, 6–7 mm (0.24–0.28 in) long and 2.75–3.0 mm (0.108–0.118 in) wide, and there are about 90 to 105 stamens in 4 or 5 rows. Flowering occurs from September to November.

== Taxonomy ==
Calytrix formosa was first formally described in 1987 by Lyndley Craven in the journal Brunonia from specimens he collected in Kalbarri National Park in 1981. The specific epithet (formosa) means 'beautiful'.

== Distribution and habitat ==
This species of Calytrix is found on sandplains in the Kalbarri district, where it grows in heath on sand in the Carnarvon, Geraldton Sandplains and Yalgoo bioregions in the west of Western Australia.

== Conservation status ==
Calytrix formosa is listed as "Priority Three" by the Government of Western Australia Department of Biodiversity, Conservation and Attractions meaning that it is poorly known and known from only a few locations but is not under imminent threat.
