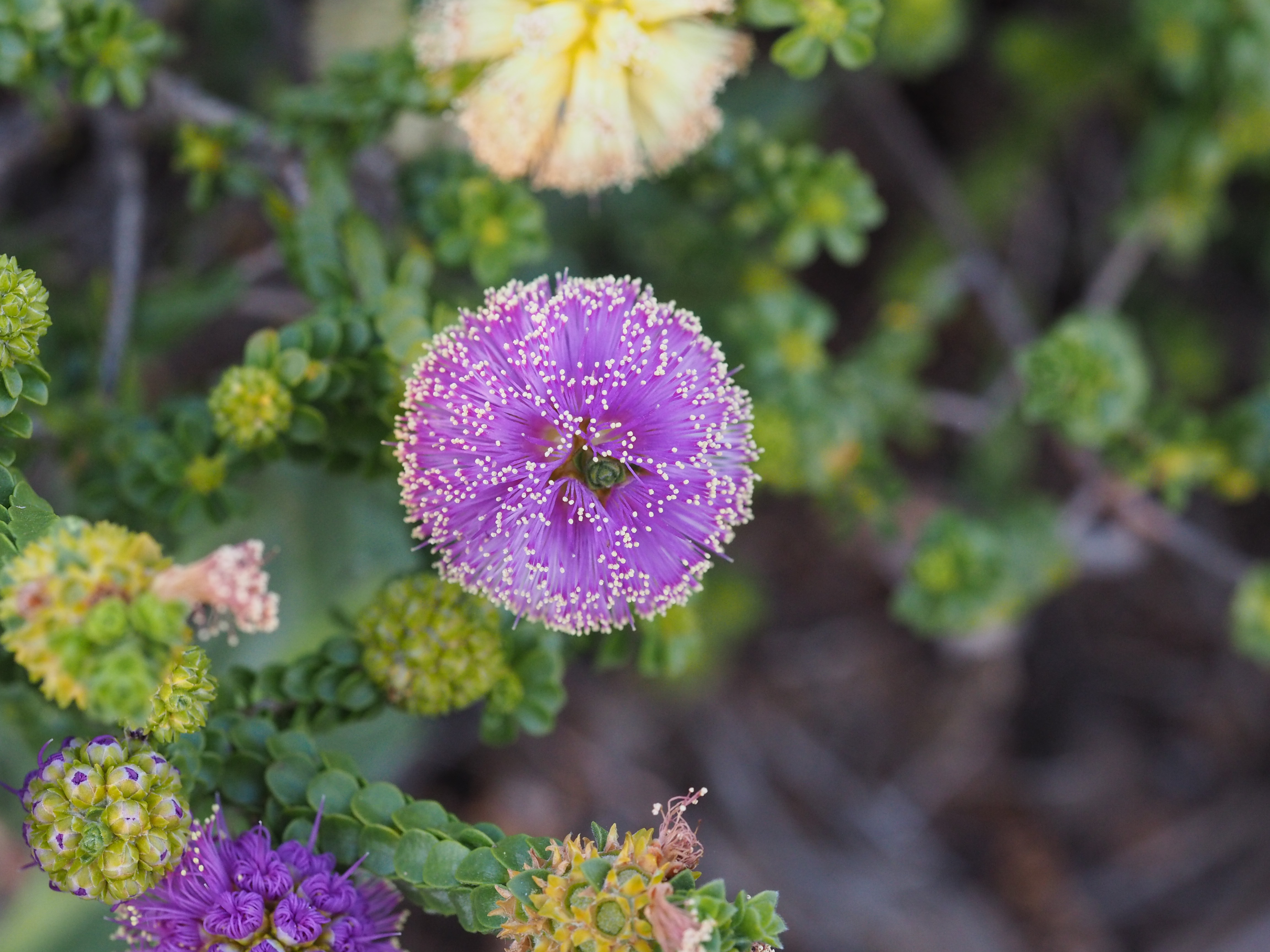

Scientific classification
- Kingdom: Plantae
- Clade: Tracheophytes
- Clade: Angiosperms
- Clade: Eudicots
- Clade: Rosids
- Order: Myrtales
- Family: Myrtaceae
- Genus: Phymatocarpus
- Species: P. porphyrocephalus

Binomial name
- Phymatocarpus porphyrocephalus F.Muell.

Synonyms
- Melaleuca porphyrocephala (F.Muell.) Craven & R.D.Edwards

= Phymatocarpus porphyrocephalus =

Species of flowering plant

Phymatocarpus porphyrocephalus is a plant in the myrtle family, Myrtaceae and is endemic to the south-west of Western Australia. It resembles many small species of Melaleuca, mainly differing in the way its anthers are attached at the top of the stamens. In Phymatocarpus they are attached at their base and open at the other end through two slits. It is a shrub with many small heads of pink to purple flowers fading to white, often covering the plant for several weeks in spring.

== Description ==
Phymatocarpus porphyrocephalus is an erect to spreading shrub which sometimes grows to a height and width of 2 metres (7 ft). The leaves are arranged alternately and are 4–6 millimetres (0.16–0.24 in) long. They are broad elliptic to egg-shaped with the narrow end towards the base, sometimes almost circular and have 1 to 3 veins.

The flowers are pink to purple, fading to white and are arranged in dense, roughly spherical heads on the ends of branches which continue to grow after flowering. There are leaf-like bracts at the base of flowers and 5 sepals, 5 petals and 46 to 71 stamens. The stamens are joined in a continuous ring around the edge of each flower. Flowering usually occurs from August to December and is followed by fruits which are woody capsules. The capsules are arranged in spherical clusters which are rough or lumpy on the outer surface.

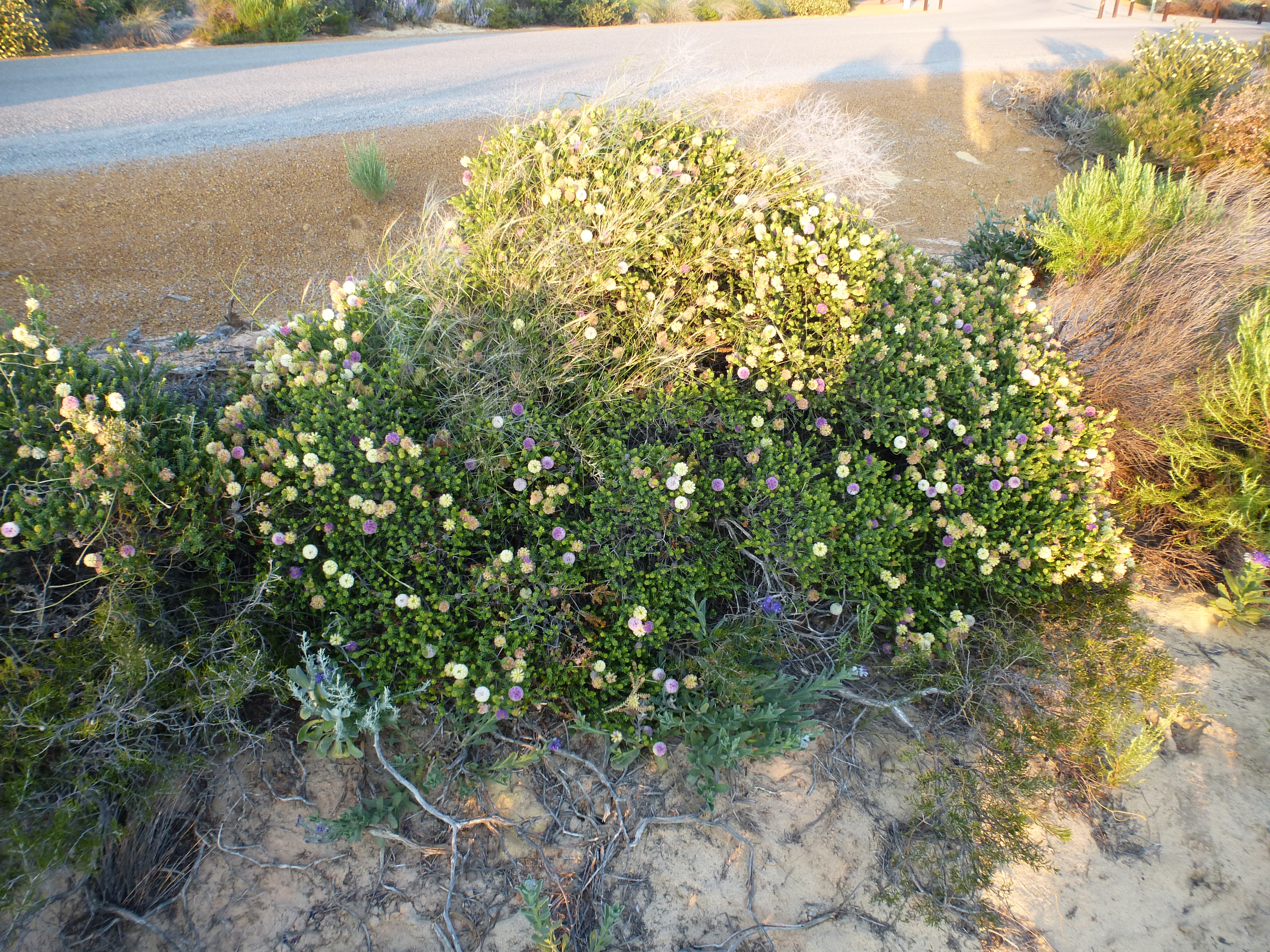
Phymatocarpus porphyrocephalus growing at Red Bluff near Kalbarri

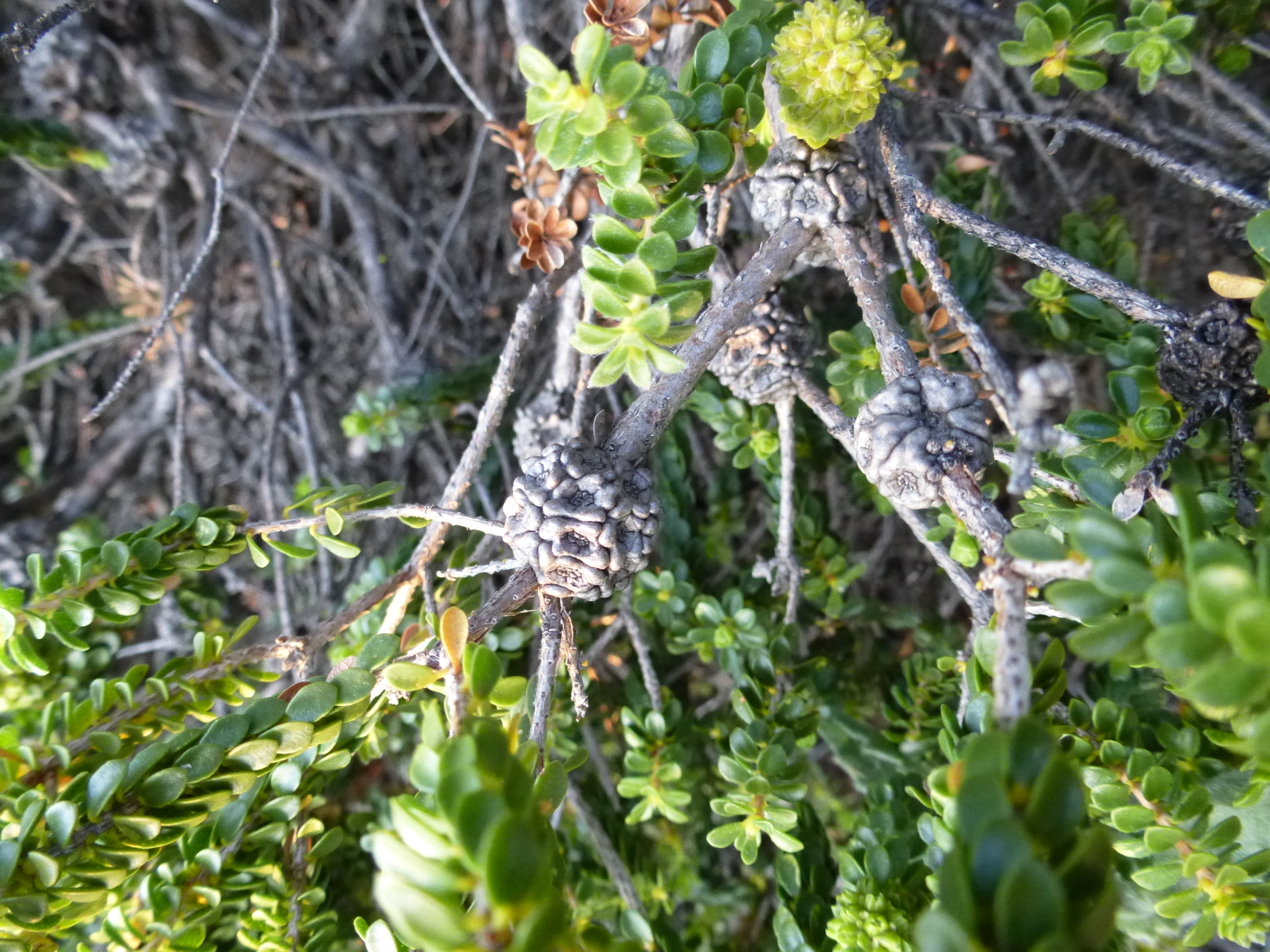
Phymatocarpus porphyrocephalus leaves and fruits

== Taxonomy and naming ==
Phymatocarpus porphyrocephalus was the first Phymatocarpus to be formally described. The description was published in 1862 by Ferdinand von Mueller in Fragmenta Phytographiae Australiae. The specific epithet (porphyrocephalus) is from the Ancient Greek words πορφύρα (porphúra) meaning "purple" and κεφαλή (kephalḗ) meaning “head”.

== Distribution and habitat ==
Phymatocarpus porphyrocephalus occurs in and between the Murchison River and Eneabba districts in the Carnarvon, Geraldton Sandplains and Yalgoo biogeographic regions. It grows in sand over sandstone or limestone on sandplains or in gorges near the coast.

== Conservation ==
Phymatocarpus porphyrocephalus is classified as "not threatened" by the Western Australian government Department of Parks and Wildlife.
