= List of Exoneura species =

This is a list of species in genus Exoneura, the reed bees.

== Species ==
- Exoneura abstrusa Cockerell, 1922
- Exoneura albolineata Cockerell, 1929
- Exoneura albopilosa Rayment, 1951
- Exoneura angophorae Cockerell, 1912
- Exoneura angophorella Rayment, 1948
- Exoneura apposita Rayment, 1949
- Exoneura aterrima Cockerell, 1916
- Exoneura baculifera Cockerell, 1922
- Exoneura baxteri Rayment, 1956
- Exoneura bicincta Rayment, 1935
- Exoneura bicolor Smith, 1854
- Exoneura botanica Cockerell, 1905
- Exoneura brisbanensis Cockerell, 1916
- Exoneura clarissima Cockerell, 1915
- Exoneura cliffordiella Rayment, 1953
- Exoneura concinnula Cockerell, 1913
- Exoneura diversipes Cockerell, 1922
- Exoneura elongata Rayment, 1954
- Exoneura excavata Cockerell, 1922
- Exoneura florentiae Rayment, 1939
- Exoneura froggatti Friese, 1899
- Exoneura fultoni Cockerell, 1913
- Exoneura gracilis Cockerell, 1918
- Exoneura grandis Rayment, 1935
- Exoneura hackeri Cockerell, 1913
- Exoneura hamulata Cockerell, 1905
- Exoneura holmesi Rayment, 1946
- Exoneura illustris Rayment, 1951
- Exoneura incerta Cockerell, 1918
- Exoneura laeta Alfken, 1907
- Exoneura maculata Rayment, 1935
- Exoneura marjoriella Rayment, 1949
- Exoneura melaena Cockerell, 1918
- Exoneura minutissima Rayment, 1951
- Exoneura montana Rayment, 1939
- Exoneura nigrescens Friese, 1899
- Exoneura nigrihirta Rayment, 1953
- Exoneura nigrofulva Rayment, 1935
- Exoneura nitida Cockerell, 1922
- Exoneura normani Rayment, 1948
- Exoneura obliterata Cockerell, 1913
- Exoneura obscura Alfken, 1907
- Exoneura obscuripes Michener, 1963
- Exoneura parvula Rayment, 1935
- Exoneura perparvula Rayment, 1948
- Exoneura perpensa Cockerell, 1922
- Exoneura perplexa Rayment, 1953
- Exoneura pictifrons Alfken, 1907
- Exoneura ploratula Cockerell, 1912
- Exoneura punctata Rayment, 1930
- Exoneura rhodoptera Cockerell, 1922
- Exoneura richardsoni Rayment, 1951
- Exoneura robusta Cockerell, 1922
- Exoneura roddiana Rayment, 1946
- Exoneura rufa Rayment, 1935
- Exoneura rufitarsis Rayment, 1948
- Exoneura schwarzi (Michener, 1983)
- Exoneura simillima Rayment, 1935
- Exoneura subbaculifera Rayment, 1948
- Exoneura subexcavata Rayment, 1951
- Exoneura subhamulata Rayment, 1935
- Exoneura tasmanica Cockerell, 1930
- Exoneura tau Cockerell, 1905
- Exoneura turneri Cockerell, 1914
- Exoneura variabilis Rayment, 1949
- Exoneura xanthoclypeata Rayment, 1935
- Exoneura ziegleri Rayment, 1935
