= Exoneura schwarzi =

Scientific classification
- Kingdom: Animalia
- Phylum: Arthropoda
- Clade: Pancrustacea
- Class: Insecta
- Order: Hymenoptera
- Family: Apidae
- Genus: Exoneura
- Species: E. schwarzi

Binomial name
- Exoneura schwarzi Michener, 1983

Synonyms
- Inquilina schwarzi Michener, 1983

Species of bee

Exoneura schwarzi, or Exoneura (Inquilina) schwarzi, is a species of reed bee in the tribe Allodapini. It is endemic to Australia. It was described in 1983 by American entomologist Charles Duncan Michener.

== Distribution and habitat ==
The species occurs in south-eastern Australia, with the type locality Brooklyn, New South Wales. It has also been recorded from the Dandenong Ranges in Victoria.

== Behaviour ==
The adults are flying mellivores. They are kleptoparasitic inquilines in the nests of Exoneura bicolor and, conjecturally, in those of Exoneura bicincta and Exoneura hamulata. All immature stages are found in the communal chamber, with the larvae fed progressively.
