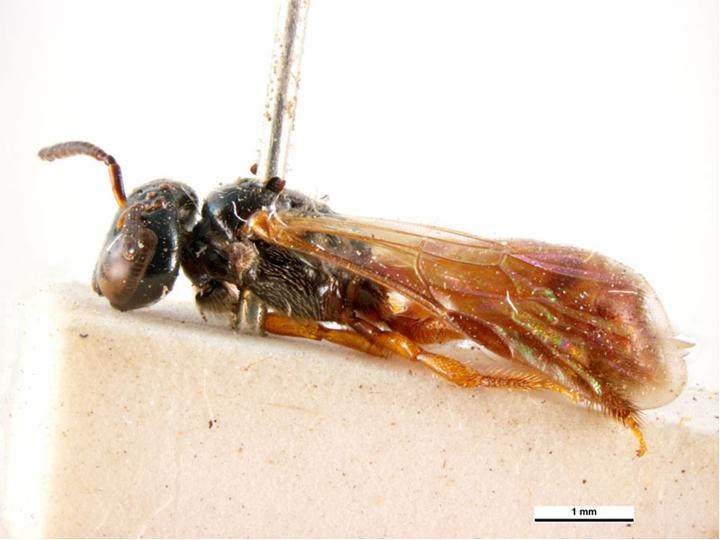
- Female

Scientific classification
- Kingdom: Animalia
- Phylum: Arthropoda
- Clade: Pancrustacea
- Class: Insecta
- Order: Hymenoptera
- Family: Apidae
- Genus: Exoneura
- Species: E. excavata

Binomial name
- Exoneura excavata Cockerell, 1922

Synonyms
- Exoneura dawsoni Rayment, 1946; Exoneura concava Rayment, 1949; Exoneura angulata Rayment, 1951

= Exoneura excavata =

Species of bee

Exoneura excavata, or Exoneura (Inquilina) excavata, is a species of reed bee in the tribe Allodapini. It is endemic to Australia. It was described in 1922 by British-American entomologist Theodore Dru Alison Cockerell.

== Taxonomy ==
E. excavata includes three species originally described by Rayment but later synonymised by Michener in 1983.

== Description ==
The body length of is 7.5 mm. Colouration is mainly black, with a dark chestnut-red abdomen.

== Distribution and habitat ==
The species occurs in eastern Australia. Type localities include Lamington National Park in south-east Queensland, Brooklyn in New South Wales, and Neerim South and Dandenong in Victoria.

== Behaviour ==
The adults are flying mellivores. They are kleptoparasitic in the nests of Exoneura variabilis, in the stems of Lantana and Olearia plants, with all immature stages found in the communal chamber, and the larvae fed progressively. Flowering plants visited by the bees include Leptospermum species.

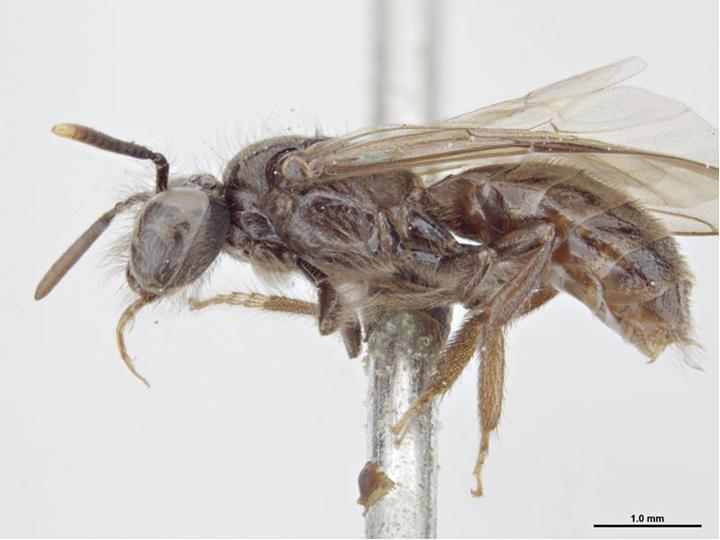
Male
