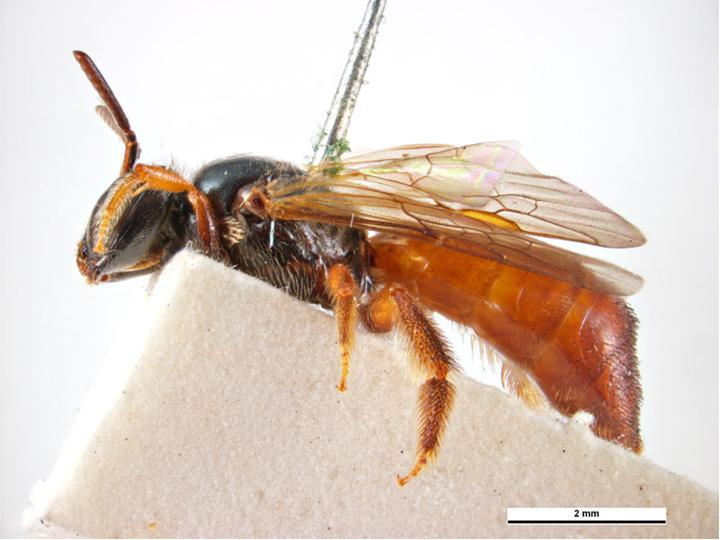
- Female

Scientific classification
- Kingdom: Animalia
- Phylum: Arthropoda
- Clade: Pancrustacea
- Class: Insecta
- Order: Hymenoptera
- Family: Apidae
- Genus: Exoneura
- Species: E. holmesi

Binomial name
- Exoneura holmesi Rayment, 1946

= Exoneura holmesi =

Species of bee

Exoneura holmesi, or Exoneura (Exoneura) holmesi, is a species of reed bee in the tribe Allodapini. It is endemic to Australia. It was described in 1946 by Australian entomologist Tarlton Rayment.

== Description ==
The body length is 5–6 mm.

== Distribution and habitat ==
The species occurs in south-eastern Australia. The type locality is Heathcote, New South Wales.

== Behaviour ==
The adults are flying mellivores. One nesting site was a gallery in a dead Banksia branch. Flowering plants visited by the bees include Leptospermum species.
