= Exoneura apposita =

Scientific classification
- Kingdom: Animalia
- Phylum: Arthropoda
- Clade: Pancrustacea
- Class: Insecta
- Order: Hymenoptera
- Family: Apidae
- Genus: Exoneura
- Species: E. apposita

Binomial name
- Exoneura apposita Rayment, 1949

Species of bee

Exoneura apposita, or Exoneura (Exoneura) apposita, is a species of reed bee in the tribe Allodapini. It is endemic to Australia. It was described in 1949 by Australian entomologist Tarlton Rayment.

== Description ==
The body length of the male holotype is 5 mm. The head and thorax are black, the abdomen ferruginous-red.

== Distribution and habitat ==
The species occurs in New South Wales. The type locality is Lane Cove in Sydney.

== Behaviour ==
The adults are flying mellivores. They nest in plant stems, including those of Lantana.
