= Exoneura punctata =

Scientific classification
- Kingdom: Animalia
- Phylum: Arthropoda
- Clade: Pancrustacea
- Class: Insecta
- Order: Hymenoptera
- Family: Apidae
- Genus: Exoneura
- Species: E. punctata

Binomial name
- Exoneura punctata Rayment, 1930

Species of bee

Exoneura punctata, or Exoneura (Exoneura) punctata, is a species of reed bee in the tribe Allodapini. It is endemic to Australia. It was described in 1930 by Australian entomologist Tarlton Rayment.

== Distribution and habitat ==
The species occurs in south-west Western Australia. The type locality is Albany. It has also been recorded from Perth.

== Behaviour ==
The adults are flying mellivores. They nest in the dead, dry stems of plants. Two or more adult females may occupy one nest, though not all females lay eggs. All immature stages are found in the communal chamber, with the larvae fed progressively.
