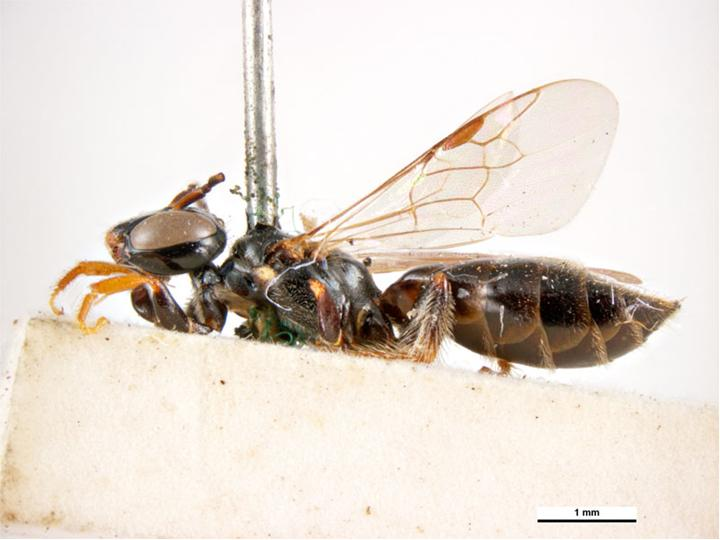
- Female

Scientific classification
- Kingdom: Animalia
- Phylum: Arthropoda
- Clade: Pancrustacea
- Class: Insecta
- Order: Hymenoptera
- Family: Apidae
- Genus: Exoneura
- Species: E. xanthoclypeata

Binomial name
- Exoneura xanthoclypeata Rayment, 1935

= Exoneura xanthoclypeata =

Species of bee

Exoneura xanthoclypeata, or Exoneura (Brevineura) xanthoclypeata, is a species of reed bee in the tribe Allodapini. It is endemic to Australia. It was described in 1935 by Australian entomologist Tarlton Rayment.

== Description ==
The body length of the male holotype is 4.5 mm. The head, thorax and abdomen are glossy black. The clypeus is bright creamy yellow.

== Distribution and habitat ==
The species occurs in Victoria. The type locality is Halls Gap in the Grampians.

== Behaviour ==
The adults are flying mellivores.

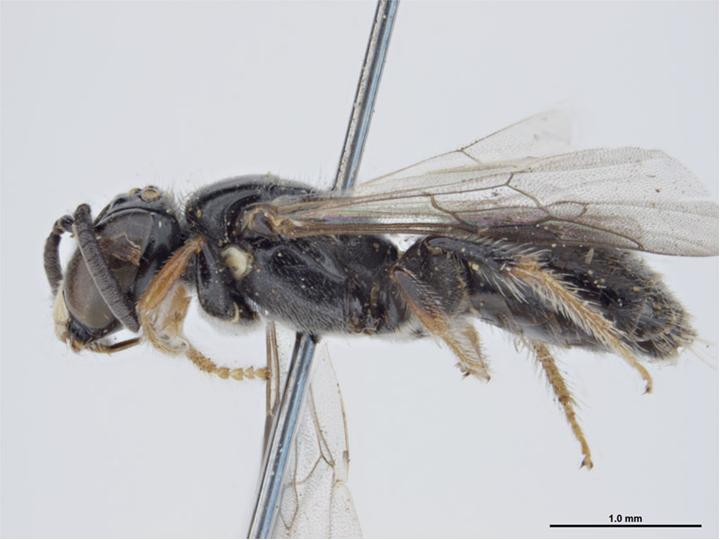
Male
