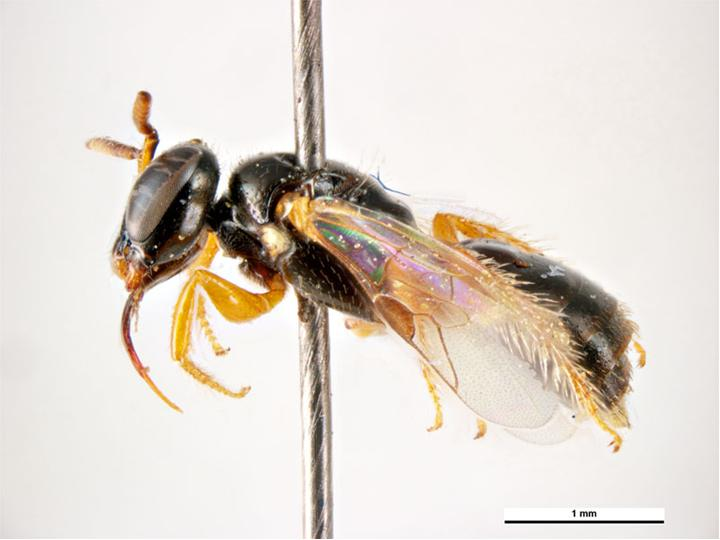
- Female

Scientific classification
- Kingdom: Animalia
- Phylum: Arthropoda
- Clade: Pancrustacea
- Class: Insecta
- Order: Hymenoptera
- Family: Apidae
- Genus: Exoneura
- Species: E. minutissima

Binomial name
- Exoneura minutissima Rayment, 1951

= Exoneura minutissima =

Species of bee

Exoneura minutissima, or Exoneura (Brevineura) minutissima, is a species of reed bee in the tribe Allodapini. It is endemic to Australia. It was described in 1951 by Australian entomologist Tarlton Rayment from specimens supplied by naturalist Rica Erickson.

== Description ==
The body length is 3 mm. The head, thorax and abdomen are glossy black, the legs reddish.

== Distribution and habitat ==
The species occurs in south-west Western Australia. The type locality is Bolgart in the Wheatbelt region.

== Behaviour ==
The adults are flying mellivores.

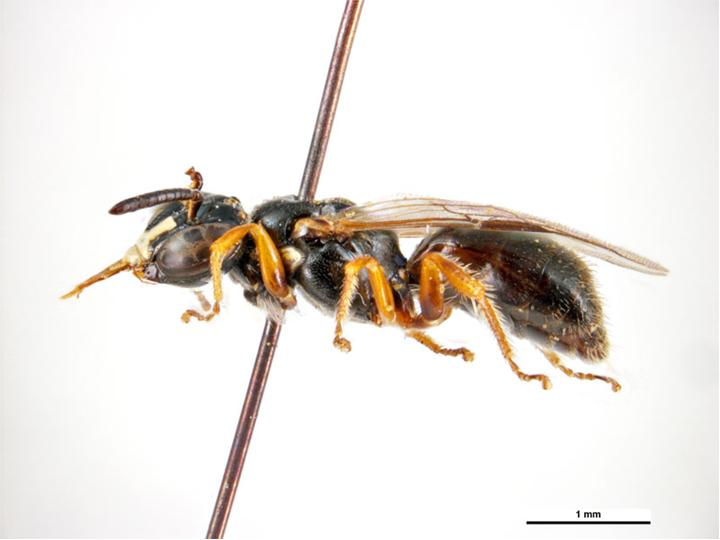
Male
