= Exoneura rufitarsis =

Scientific classification
- Kingdom: Animalia
- Phylum: Arthropoda
- Clade: Pancrustacea
- Class: Insecta
- Order: Hymenoptera
- Family: Apidae
- Genus: Exoneura
- Species: E. rufitarsis

Binomial name
- Exoneura rufitarsis Rayment, 1948

Species of bee

Exoneura rufitarsis, or Exoneura (Brevineura) rufitarsis, is a species of reed bee in the tribe Allodapini. It is endemic to Australia. It was described in 1948 by Australian entomologist Tarlton Rayment.

== Description ==
The body length of the female holotype is 6.5 mm. The head, thorax and abdomen are black.

== Distribution and habitat ==
The species occurs in Victoria The type locality is Cranbourne. Other published localities include Clyde, Cobboboonee National Park and Dandenong.

== Behaviour ==
The adults are flying mellivores with sedentary larvae. They nest in dead, dry plant stems, including those of Xanthorrhoea grasstrees and Viminaria. Two or more adult females may occupy one nest, though not all females lay eggs. All immature stages are found in the communal chamber, with the larvae fed progressively. Flowering plants visited by the bees include Trachymene species.
