= Exoneura subhamulata =

Scientific classification
- Kingdom: Animalia
- Phylum: Arthropoda
- Clade: Pancrustacea
- Class: Insecta
- Order: Hymenoptera
- Family: Apidae
- Genus: Exoneura
- Species: E. subhamulata

Binomial name
- Exoneura subhamulata Rayment, 1935

Species of bee

Exoneura subhamulata, or Exoneura (Exoneura) subhamulata, is a species of reed bee in the tribe Allodapini. It is endemic to Australia. It was described in 1935 by Australian entomologist Tarlton Rayment.

== Description ==
The body length of the female holotype is 9 mm. The head, thorax and abdomen are glossy black.

== Distribution and habitat ==
The species occurs in Victoria. The type locality is Caulfield.

== Behaviour ==
The adults are flying mellivores.
