= Exoneura illustris =

Scientific classification
- Kingdom: Animalia
- Phylum: Arthropoda
- Clade: Pancrustacea
- Class: Insecta
- Order: Hymenoptera
- Family: Apidae
- Genus: Exoneura
- Species: E. illustris

Binomial name
- Exoneura illustris Rayment, 1951

Species of bee

Exoneura illustris, or Exoneura (Exoneura) illustris, is a species of reed bee in the tribe Allodapini. It is endemic to Australia. It was described in 1951 by Australian entomologist Tarlton Rayment from specimens supplied by naturalist Rica Erickson.

== Description ==
The body length is 5.5–6 mm. The head and thorax are black, the abdomen and legs red.

== Distribution and habitat ==
The species occurs in south-west Western Australia. The type locality is 40 miles south of Perth on the Darling Scarp.

== Behaviour ==
The adults are flying mellivores. They nest in dead, dry plant stems, including the flowering stalks of Xanthorrhoea grasstrees. Two or more adult females may occupy one nest, though not all females lay eggs. All immature stages are found in the communal chamber, with the larvae fed progressively.
