= Exoneura florentiae =

Scientific classification
- Kingdom: Animalia
- Phylum: Arthropoda
- Clade: Pancrustacea
- Class: Insecta
- Order: Hymenoptera
- Family: Apidae
- Genus: Exoneura
- Species: E. florentiae

Binomial name
- Exoneura florentiae Rayment, 1939

Species of bee

Exoneura florentiae, or Exoneura (Exoneura) florentiae, is a species of reed bee in the tribe Allodapini. It is endemic to Australia. It was described in 1939 by Australian entomologist Tarlton Rayment.

== Etymology ==
The specific epithet florentiae honours Elsa Florence d’Henzil Gosewinckel in appreciation of her assistance in collecting specimens.

== Description ==
The body length of the female holotype is 6 mm. The head and thorax are glossy black, the abdomen red.

== Distribution and habitat ==
The species occurs in Victoria. The type locality is the Black Sands estate in the Yarra Valley.

== Behaviour ==
The adults are flying mellivores. Flowering plants visited by the bees include Dillwynia species.
