= Exoneura normani =

Scientific classification
- Kingdom: Animalia
- Phylum: Arthropoda
- Clade: Pancrustacea
- Class: Insecta
- Order: Hymenoptera
- Family: Apidae
- Genus: Exoneura
- Species: E. normani

Binomial name
- Exoneura normani Rayment, 1948

Synonyms
- Exoneura roddiana normani Rayment, 1948

Species of bee

Exoneura normani, or Exoneura (Brevineura) normani, is a species of reed bee in the tribe Allodapini. It is endemic to Australia. It was described in 1948 by Australian entomologist Tarlton Rayment.

== Description ==
The head, thorax and abdomen are black.

== Distribution and habitat ==
The species occurs in New South Wales. The type locality is Lane Cove in Sydney.

== Behaviour ==
The adults are flying mellivores.
