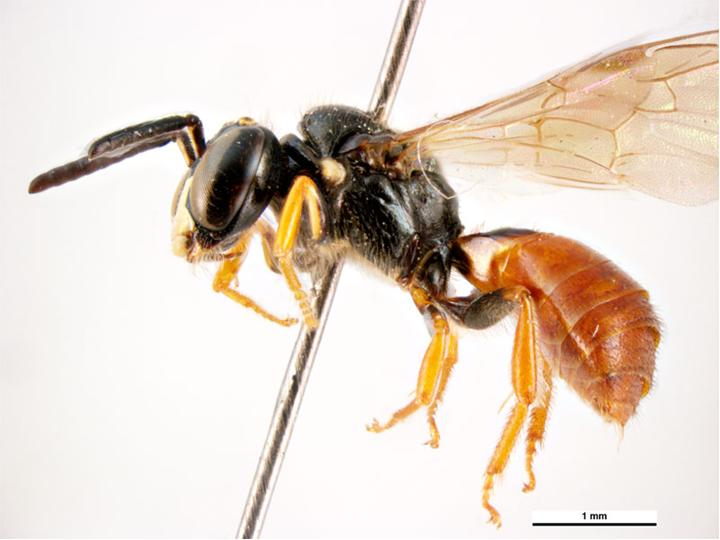
- Male

Scientific classification
- Kingdom: Animalia
- Phylum: Arthropoda
- Clade: Pancrustacea
- Class: Insecta
- Order: Hymenoptera
- Family: Apidae
- Genus: Exoneura
- Species: E. concinnula

Binomial name
- Exoneura concinnula Cockerell, 1913

= Exoneura concinnula =

Species of bee

Exoneura concinnula, or Exoneura (Brevineura) concinnula, is a species of reed bee in the tribe Allodapini. It is endemic to Australia. It was described in 1913 by British-American entomologist Theodore Dru Alison Cockerell.

== Distribution and habitat ==
The species occurs in eastern mainland Australia.

== Behaviour ==
The adults are flying mellivores with sedentary larvae. They nest in galls formed by Ethonion beetles on the stems of plants such as Pultenaea species. Two or more adult females may occupy one nest, though not all females lay eggs. All the immature stages may be found in the communal chamber, with the larvae fed progressively. Flowering plants visited by the bees include Angophora, Bursaria, Calytrix, Jacksonia and Leptospermum species.

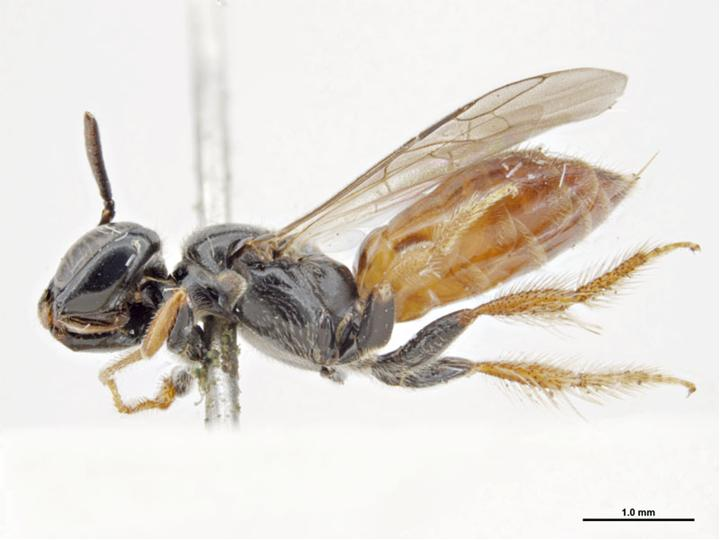
Female
