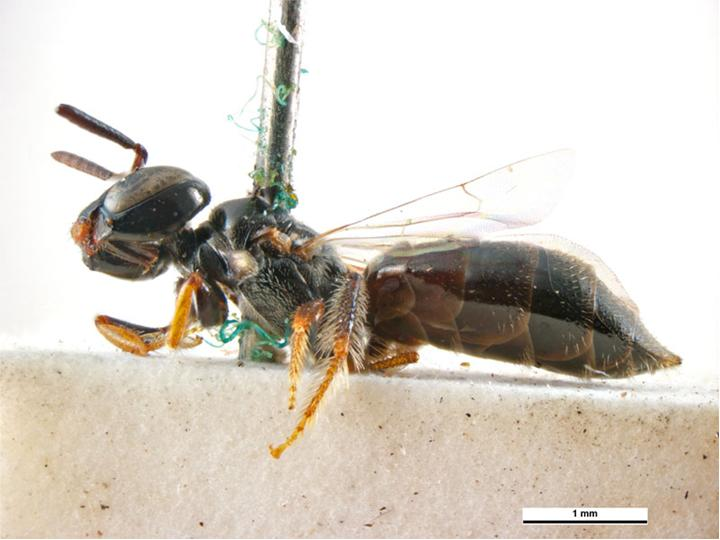
- Female

Scientific classification
- Kingdom: Animalia
- Phylum: Arthropoda
- Clade: Pancrustacea
- Class: Insecta
- Order: Hymenoptera
- Family: Apidae
- Genus: Exoneura
- Species: E. roddiana

Binomial name
- Exoneura roddiana Rayment, 1946

= Exoneura roddiana =

Species of bee

Exoneura roddiana, or Exoneura (Brevineura) roddiana, is a species of reed bee in the tribe Allodapini. It is endemic to Australia. It was described in 1946 by Australian entomologist Tarlton Rayment.

== Description ==
The body length is 4 mm. The head, thorax and abdomen are black.

== Distribution and habitat ==
The species occurs in south-eastern Australia. The type locality is Lane Cove in Sydney. It has also been recorded from the Grampians of western Victoria.

== Behaviour ==
The adults are flying mellivores with sedentary larvae. They nest in dead, dry plant stems, including Lantana. Two or more adult females may occupy one nest, though not all females lay eggs. All immature stages are found in the communal chamber, with the larvae fed progressively. Flowering plants visited by the bees include Acacia species.
