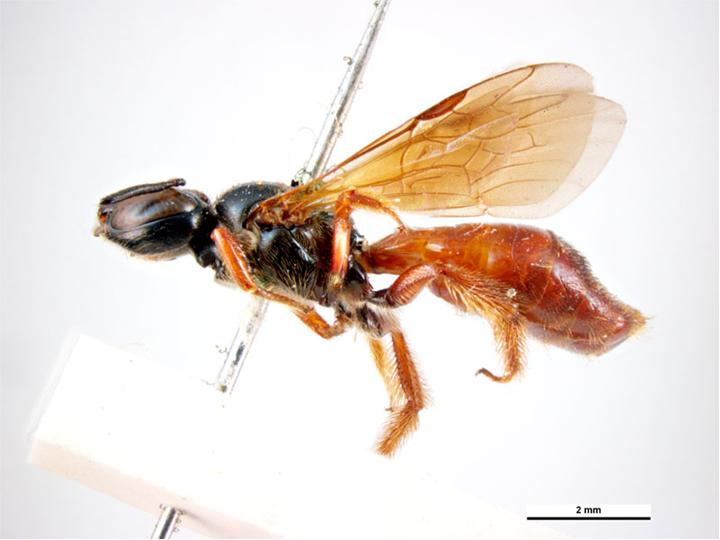
- Female

Scientific classification
- Kingdom: Animalia
- Phylum: Arthropoda
- Clade: Pancrustacea
- Class: Insecta
- Order: Hymenoptera
- Family: Apidae
- Genus: Exoneura
- Species: E. montana

Binomial name
- Exoneura montana Rayment, 1939

= Exoneura montana =

Species of bee

Exoneura montana, or Exoneura (Exoneura) montana, is a species of reed bee in the tribe Allodapini. It is endemic to Australia. It was described in 1939 by Australian entomologist Tarlton Rayment.

== Description ==
The body length is 6–9 mm.

== Distribution and habitat ==
The species occurs in south-eastern Australia. The type locality is White Swamp in the McPherson Range of north-eastern New South Wales. Other published localities include Patonga Beach and Brooklyn, as well as Mount Buffalo in Victoria.

== Behaviour ==
The adults are flying mellivores with sedentary larvae. They nest in dead, dry plant stems, including Lantana. Two or more adult females may occupy one nest, though not all females lay eggs. All immature stages are found in the communal chamber, with the larvae fed progressively. Flowering plants visited by the bees include Kunzea and Stylidium species.
