= Exoneura nigrihirta =

Scientific classification
- Kingdom: Animalia
- Phylum: Arthropoda
- Clade: Pancrustacea
- Class: Insecta
- Order: Hymenoptera
- Family: Apidae
- Genus: Exoneura
- Species: E. nigrihirta

Binomial name
- Exoneura nigrihirta Rayment, 1953

Species of bee

Exoneura nigrihirta, or Exoneura (Exoneura) nigrihirta, is a species of reed bee in the tribe Allodapini. It is endemic to Australia. It was described in 1953 by Australian entomologist Tarlton Rayment.

== Description ==
The body length is 6.5–7.5 mm. The head and thorax are glossy black, the abdomen and legs red.

== Distribution and habitat ==
The species occurs in Victoria. The type locality is Bats Ridges in the Portland district.

== Behaviour ==
The adults are flying mellivores. They nest in dead, dry plant stems. Two or more adult females may occupy one nest, though not all females lay eggs. All immature stages are found in the communal chamber, with the larvae fed progressively. Flowering plants visited by the bees include Leptospermum and Leucopogon species.
