= Exoneura elongata =

Scientific classification
- Kingdom: Animalia
- Phylum: Arthropoda
- Clade: Pancrustacea
- Class: Insecta
- Order: Hymenoptera
- Family: Apidae
- Genus: Exoneura
- Species: E. elongata

Binomial name
- Exoneura elongata Rayment, 1954

Species of bee

Exoneura elongata, or Exoneura (Brevineura) elongata, is a species of reed bee in the tribe Allodapini. It is endemic to Australia. It was described in 1954 by Australian entomologist Tarlton Rayment from a specimen collected by naturalist Clifford Beauglehole.

== Description ==
The body length of the female holotype is 9 mm. The head and thorax are glossy black, the abdomen and legs red.

== Distribution and habitat ==
The species occurs in Victoria. The type locality is Gorae West in the Portland district.

== Behaviour ==
The adults are flying mellivores.
