= Exoneura baxteri =

Scientific classification
- Kingdom: Animalia
- Phylum: Arthropoda
- Clade: Pancrustacea
- Class: Insecta
- Order: Hymenoptera
- Family: Apidae
- Genus: Exoneura
- Species: E. baxteri

Binomial name
- Exoneura baxteri Rayment, 1956

Species of bee

Exoneura elongata, or Exoneura (Exoneura) elongata, is a species of reed bee in the tribe Allodapini. It is endemic to Australia. It was described in 1956 by Australian entomologist Tarlton Rayment from specimens collected by naturalist Clifford Beauglehole.

== Description ==
The body length is 6.5–7 mm. The head and thorax are glossy black, the abdomen apricot-coloured.

== Distribution and habitat ==
The species occurs in Victoria. The type locality is Gorae West in the Portland district.

== Behaviour ==
The adults are flying mellivores. Of the original collection, Rayment wrote:

"On January 31, 1955, Clifford Beauglehole took a very long series of adult bees, 9 males and 17 females, together with 10 pupae, from one small gallery which had been bored, probably by a beetle, in a dry branch of Eucalyptus baxteri, at Bats Ridges, near Portland, Victoria. This was a particularly populous colony of these simple social bees... There are only two generations in Exoneura for the season, and the colony from Bats Ridges had undoubtedly reached the apex of its activity with its first brood."
