= Exoneura albopilosa =

Scientific classification
- Kingdom: Animalia
- Phylum: Arthropoda
- Clade: Pancrustacea
- Class: Insecta
- Order: Hymenoptera
- Family: Apidae
- Genus: Exoneura
- Species: E. albopilosa

Binomial name
- Exoneura albopilosa Rayment, 1951

Species of bee

Exoneura albopilosa, or Exoneura (Exoneura) albopilosa, is a species of reed bee in the tribe Allodapini. It is endemic to Australia. It was described in 1951 by Australian entomologist Tarlton Rayment from specimens supplied by naturalist Rica Erickson.

== Description ==
The body length of the male holotype is 5.5 mm. The head, thorax and abdomen are black.

== Distribution and habitat ==
The species occurs in south-west Western Australia. The type locality is 40 miles south of Perth.

== Behaviour ==
The adults are flying mellivores. They nest in dead, dry plant stems, including the flowering stalks of Xanthorrhoea grasstrees.
