= Exoneura angophorella =

Scientific classification
- Kingdom: Animalia
- Phylum: Arthropoda
- Clade: Pancrustacea
- Class: Insecta
- Order: Hymenoptera
- Family: Apidae
- Genus: Exoneura
- Species: E. angophorella

Binomial name
- Exoneura angophorella Rayment, 1948

Species of bee

Exoneura angophorella, or Exoneura (Exoneura) angophorella, is a species of reed bee in the tribe Allodapini. It is endemic to Australia. It was described in 1948 by Australian entomologist Tarlton Rayment.

== Description ==
The body length of the female holotype is 6 mm. The head and thorax are glossy black, the abdomen reddish-ferruginous.

== Distribution and habitat ==
The species occurs in New South Wales. The type locality is Lane Cove in Sydney.

== Behaviour ==
The adults are flying mellivores. They nest in dead, dry plant stems, including Lantana.
