= Exoneura perplexa =

Scientific classification
- Kingdom: Animalia
- Phylum: Arthropoda
- Clade: Pancrustacea
- Class: Insecta
- Order: Hymenoptera
- Family: Apidae
- Genus: Exoneura
- Species: E. perplexa

Binomial name
- Exoneura perplexa Rayment, 1953

Species of bee

Exoneura perplexa, or Exoneura (Brevineura) perplexa, is a species of reed bee in the tribe Allodapini. It is endemic to Australia. It was described in 1953 by Australian entomologist Tarlton Rayment.

== Description ==
The body length is 5.5 mm. The head and thorax are glossy black, the abdomen dusky red.

== Distribution and habitat ==
The species occurs in Victoria. The type locality is Mount Clay in the Portland district.

== Behaviour ==
The adults are flying mellivores. Flowering plants visited by the bees include Leptospermum and aster species.
