= Exoneura subbaculifera =

Scientific classification
- Kingdom: Animalia
- Phylum: Arthropoda
- Clade: Pancrustacea
- Class: Insecta
- Order: Hymenoptera
- Family: Apidae
- Genus: Exoneura
- Species: E. subbaculifera

Binomial name
- Exoneura subbaculifera Rayment, 1948

Species of bee

Exoneura subbaculifera, or Exoneura (Exoneura) subbaculifera, is a species of reed bee in the tribe Allodapini. It is endemic to Australia. It was described in 1948 by Australian entomologist Tarlton Rayment.

== Description ==
Body length is 6.5 mm. The head and thorax are black, the abdomen red.

== Distribution and habitat ==
The species occurs in eastern Australia The type locality is Lindfield, New South Wales. It has also been recorded from Cunninghams Gap in Queensland.

== Behaviour ==
The adults are flying mellivores. They nest in dead, dry plant stems, including those of Rubus and Erythrina species. Two or more adult females may occupy one nest, though not all females lay eggs. All immature stages are found in the communal chamber, with the larvae fed progressively.
