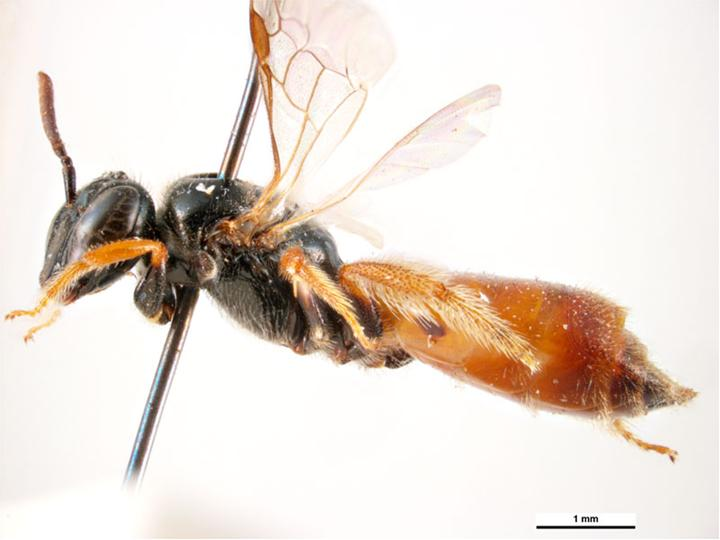
- Female

Scientific classification
- Kingdom: Animalia
- Phylum: Arthropoda
- Clade: Pancrustacea
- Class: Insecta
- Order: Hymenoptera
- Family: Apidae
- Genus: Exoneura
- Species: E. froggatti

Binomial name
- Exoneura froggatti Friese, 1899

= Exoneura froggatti =

Species of bee

Exoneura froggatti, or Exoneura (Brevineura) froggatti, is a species of reed bee in the tribe Allodapini. It is endemic to Australia. It was described in 1899 by German entomologist Heinrich Friese.

== Distribution and habitat ==
The species occurs in New South Wales and the Grampians region of Victoria. The type locality is Thornleigh, Sydney.

== Behaviour ==
The adults are flying mellivores with sedentary larvae. They nest in the galls formed by Ethonion beetles, or in the pithy stems of swordgrass. Two or more adult females may occupy one nest, though not all females lay eggs. All the immature stages of the bees may be found in the communal chamber. Flowering plants visited by the bees include Angophora species.
