= Exoneura maculata =

Scientific classification
- Kingdom: Animalia
- Phylum: Arthropoda
- Clade: Pancrustacea
- Class: Insecta
- Order: Hymenoptera
- Family: Apidae
- Genus: Exoneura
- Species: E. maculata

Binomial name
- Exoneura maculata Rayment, 1935

Species of bee

Exoneura maculata, or Exoneura (Brevineura) maculata, is a species of reed bee in the tribe Allodapini. It is endemic to Australia. It was described in 1935 by Australian entomologist Tarlton Rayment.

== Description ==
The body length is 7 mm. The head and thorax are glossy black, the abdomen mostly light chestnut-red.

== Distribution and habitat ==
The species occurs in Victoria. The type locality is Seville.

== Behaviour ==
The adults are flying mellivores. Flowering plants visited by the bees include Arctotheca, Bursaria and Hypochaeris species.
