= Exoneura nigrofulva =

Scientific classification
- Kingdom: Animalia
- Phylum: Arthropoda
- Clade: Pancrustacea
- Class: Insecta
- Order: Hymenoptera
- Family: Apidae
- Genus: Exoneura
- Species: E. nigrofulva

Binomial name
- Exoneura nigrofulva Rayment, 1935

Species of bee

Exoneura nigrofulva, or Exoneura (Brevineura) nigrofulva, is a species of reed bee in the tribe Allodapini. It is endemic to Australia. It was described in 1935 by Australian entomologist Tarlton Rayment.

== Description ==
The body length is 5 mm. The head, thorax and abdomen are glossy black.

== Distribution and habitat ==
The species occurs in Victoria. The type locality is Halls Gap in the Grampians.

== Behaviour ==
The adults are flying mellivores. Flowering plants visited by the bees include Bursaria species.
