= Exoneura perparvula =

Scientific classification
- Kingdom: Animalia
- Phylum: Arthropoda
- Clade: Pancrustacea
- Class: Insecta
- Order: Hymenoptera
- Family: Apidae
- Genus: Exoneura
- Species: E. perparvula

Binomial name
- Exoneura perparvula Rayment, 1948

Synonyms
- Exoneura parvula perparvula Rayment, 1948

Species of bee

Exoneura perparvula, or Exoneura (Brevineura) perparvula, is a species of reed bee in the tribe Allodapini. It is endemic to Australia. It was described in 1948 by Australian entomologist Tarlton Rayment.

== Description ==
The head and thorax are black, the abdomen red.

== Distribution and habitat ==
The species occurs in eastern Australia The type locality is Bundeena in Sydney.

== Behaviour ==
The adults are flying mellivores. Flowering plants visited by the bees include Eucalyptus species.
