= Exoneura simillima =

Scientific classification
- Kingdom: Animalia
- Phylum: Arthropoda
- Clade: Pancrustacea
- Class: Insecta
- Order: Hymenoptera
- Family: Apidae
- Genus: Exoneura
- Species: E. simillima

Binomial name
- Exoneura simillima Rayment, 1935

Species of bee

Exoneura simillima, or Exoneura (Brevineura) simillima, is a species of reed bee in the tribe Allodapini. It is endemic to Australia. It was described in 1935 by Australian entomologist Tarlton Rayment.

== Description ==
The body length of the female holotype is 8 mm. The head and thorax are glossy black, the abdomen light chestnut-red.

== Distribution and habitat ==
The species occurs in Victoria. The type locality is Marysville. Other published localities include the Portland district and the Grampians.

== Behaviour ==
The adults are flying mellivores. They nest in dead, dry plant stems. Two or more adult females may occupy one nest, though not all females lay eggs. All immature stages are found in the communal chamber, with the larvae fed progressively. Flowering plants visited by the bees include Leucopogon species.
