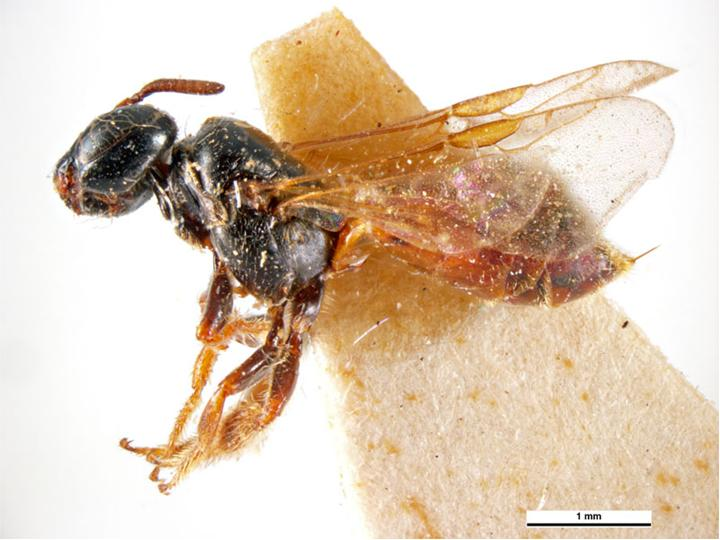
- Female

Scientific classification
- Kingdom: Animalia
- Phylum: Arthropoda
- Clade: Pancrustacea
- Class: Insecta
- Order: Hymenoptera
- Family: Apidae
- Genus: Exoneura
- Species: E. parvula

Binomial name
- Exoneura parvula Rayment, 1935

= Exoneura parvula =

Species of bee

Exoneura parvula, or Exoneura (Brevineura) parvula, is a species of reed bee in the tribe Allodapini. It is endemic to Australia. It was described in 1935 by Australian entomologist Tarlton Rayment.

== Description ==
The body length of males is 3 mm, females 3.5 mm. The head and thorax are glossy black, the abdomen mostly chestnut-red.

== Distribution and habitat ==
The species occurs in south-eastern Australia. The type locality is Marysville in Victoria. Other published localities include Sydney and Woy Woy in New South Wales.

== Behaviour ==
The adults are flying mellivores. They nest in dead, dry plant stems. Two or more adult females may occupy one nest, though not all females lay eggs. All immature stages are found in the communal chamber, with the larvae fed progressively. Flowering plants visited by the bees include Bursaria and Hypochaeris species.
