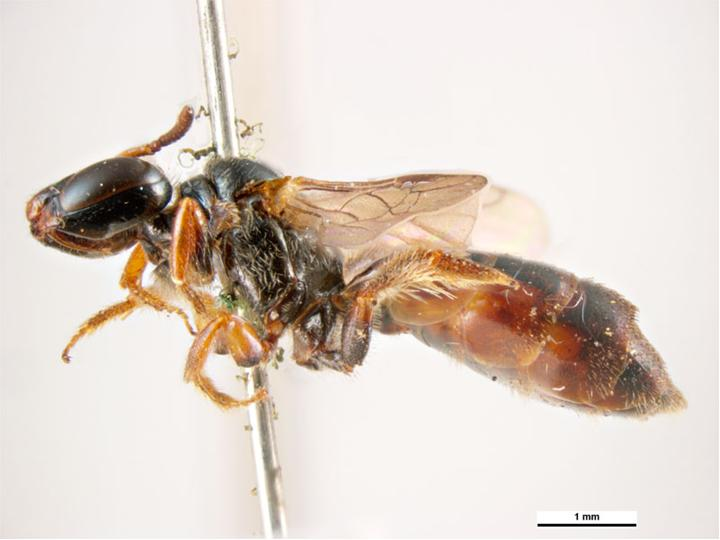
- Female

Scientific classification
- Kingdom: Animalia
- Phylum: Arthropoda
- Clade: Pancrustacea
- Class: Insecta
- Order: Hymenoptera
- Family: Apidae
- Genus: Exoneura
- Species: E. obscura

Binomial name
- Exoneura obscura Alfken, 1907

= Exoneura obscura =

Species of bee

Exoneura obscura or Exoneura (Exoneura) obscura is a species of reed bee in the tribe Allodapini. It is endemic to Australia. It was described in 1907 by German entomologist Johann Dietrich Alfken.

== Distribution and habitat ==
The species occurs in south-west Western Australia, including Rottnest Island. The type locality is Mundijong.

== Behaviour ==
The adults are flying mellivores.
