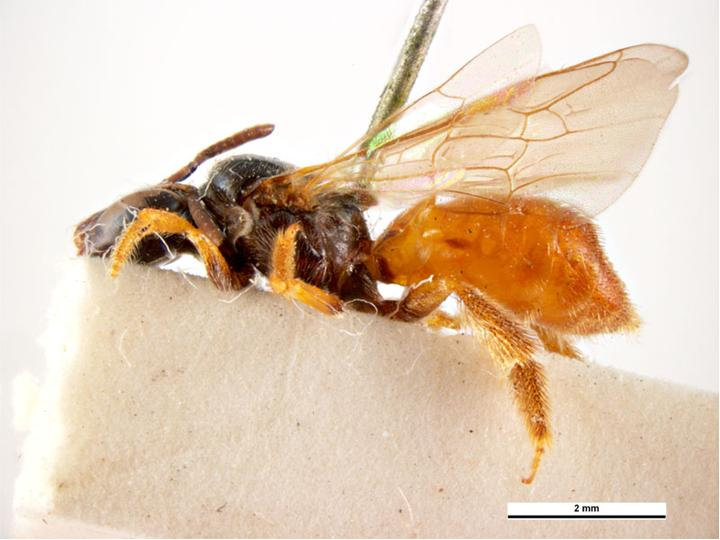
- Female

Scientific classification
- Kingdom: Animalia
- Phylum: Arthropoda
- Clade: Pancrustacea
- Class: Insecta
- Order: Hymenoptera
- Family: Apidae
- Genus: Exoneura
- Species: E. perpensa

Binomial name
- Exoneura perpensa Cockerell, 1922

= Exoneura perpensa =

Species of bee

Exoneura perpensa, or Exoneura (Exoneura) perpensa, is a species of reed bee in the tribe Allodapini. It is endemic to Australia. It was described in 1922 by British-American entomologist Theodore Dru Alison Cockerell.

== Description ==
The body length of is 6 mm. Colouration is mainly black, with the abdomen a dull, clouded red.

== Distribution and habitat ==
The species occurs in New South Wales and Victoria. The type locality is Armidale; another published locality is Portland.

== Behaviour ==
The adults are flying mellivores. They nest in dead, dry plant stems. Two or more adult females may occupy one nest, though not all females lay eggs. All immature stages are found in the communal chamber, with the larvae fed progressively. Flowering plants visited by the bees include Bursaria, Eucalyptus and Lomatia species.
