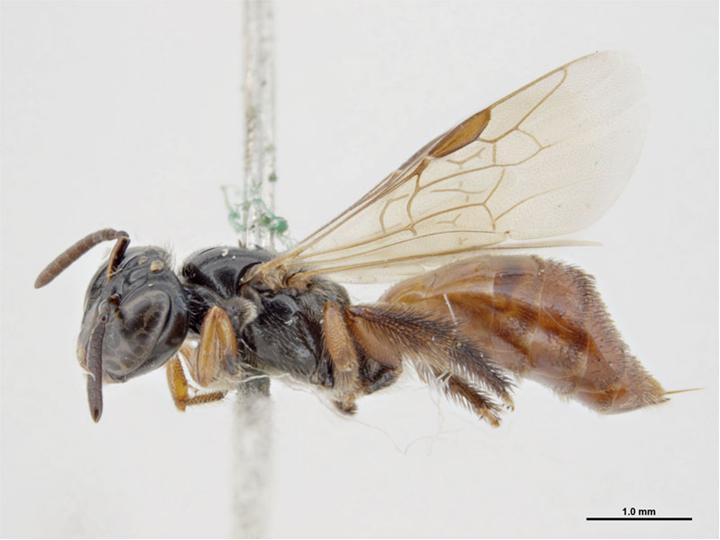
- Female

Scientific classification
- Kingdom: Animalia
- Phylum: Arthropoda
- Clade: Pancrustacea
- Class: Insecta
- Order: Hymenoptera
- Family: Apidae
- Genus: Exoneura
- Species: E. albolineata

Binomial name
- Exoneura albolineata Cockerell, 1929

= Exoneura albolineata =

Species of bee

Exoneura albolineata, or Exoneura (Brevineura) albolineata, is a species of reed bee in the tribe Allodapini. It is endemic to Australia. It was described in 1929 by British-American entomologist Theodore Dru Alison Cockerell.

== Description ==
The body length of is 5.5 mm. The head and thorax are glossy black, the abdomen dusky red.

== Distribution and habitat ==
The species occurs in south-eastern Australia. The type locality is Ulong on the eastern Dorrigo Plateau. Other published localities include Lane Cove and Brooklyn in New South Wales, and Dandenong in Victoria.

== Behaviour ==
The adults are flying mellivores with sedentary larvae. They nest in the dead, dry stems of Rubus, Dahlia, Hydrangea, Lantana and Rosa species. Two or more adult females may occupy one nest, though not all females lay eggs. All immature stages are found in the communal chamber, with the larvae fed progressively.
