= Exoneura variabilis =

Scientific classification
- Kingdom: Animalia
- Phylum: Arthropoda
- Clade: Pancrustacea
- Class: Insecta
- Order: Hymenoptera
- Family: Apidae
- Genus: Exoneura
- Species: E. variabilis

Binomial name
- Exoneura variabilis Rayment, 1949

Species of bee

Exoneura variabilis, or Exoneura (Exoneura) variabilis, is a species of reed bee in the tribe Allodapini. It is endemic to Australia. It was described in 1949 by Australian entomologist Tarlton Rayment.

== Description ==
The head and thorax are black, the abdomen ferruginous-red.

== Distribution and habitat ==
The species occurs in New South Wales and Queensland. The type locality is Narooma.

== Behaviour ==
The adults are flying mellivores with sedentary larvae. They nest in dead, dry plant stems, including those of Deeringia, Hydrangea, Plectranthus, Rubus and Lantana. Flowering plants visited by the bees include Bursaria, Erigeron, Helichrysum, Leucopogon and Lomatia.
