= Leioproctus wilsoni =

Scientific classification
- Kingdom: Animalia
- Phylum: Arthropoda
- Clade: Pancrustacea
- Class: Insecta
- Order: Hymenoptera
- Family: Colletidae
- Genus: Leioproctus
- Species: L. wilsoni

Binomial name
- Leioproctus wilsoni (Rayment, 1930)

Synonyms
- Andrenopsis wilsoni Rayment, 1930

Species of bee

Leioproctus wilsoni, or Leioproctus (Andrenopsis) wilsoni, is a species of bee in the family Colletidae and subfamily Colletinae. It is endemic to Australia. It was described by Australian entomologist Tarlton Rayment in 1930.

== Description ==
Male body length is about 9 mm. Integumental colouration is mainly black, the abdominal dorsal segments ferruginous, the hair white.

== Distribution and habitat ==
The species occurs in Victoria. The type locality is the Bogong High Plains.

== Behaviour ==
The adults are flying mellivores. Flowering plants visited by the bees include Eucalyptus species.
