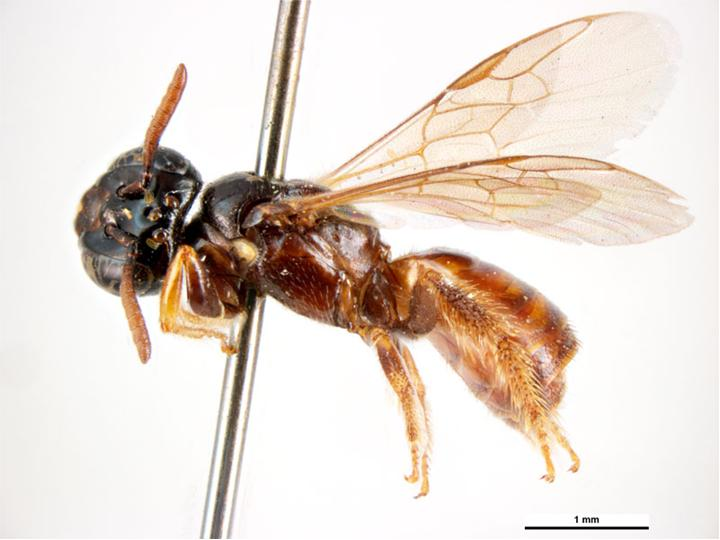
- Female

Scientific classification
- Kingdom: Animalia
- Phylum: Arthropoda
- Clade: Pancrustacea
- Class: Insecta
- Order: Hymenoptera
- Family: Apidae
- Genus: Exoneura
- Species: E. brisbanensis

Binomial name
- Exoneura brisbanensis Cockerell, 1916

= Exoneura brisbanensis =

Species of bee

Exoneura brisbanensis, or Exoneura (Brevineura) brisbanensis, is a species of reed bee in the tribe Allodapini. It is endemic to Australia. It was described in 1916 by British-American entomologist Theodore Dru Alison Cockerell.

== Description ==
The body length is 5 mm. The head and thorax are glossy black, the abdomen dark chestnut-red.

== Distribution and habitat ==
The species occurs in south-east Queensland. The type locality is Brisbane; other published localities include Capalaba, Tamborine and Caloundra.

== Behaviour ==
The adults are flying mellivores. They nest in the dead, dry stems. Two or more adult females may occupy one nest, though not all females lay eggs. All the immature stages are found in the communal chamber, with the larvae fed progressively. Flowering plants visited by the bees include Alphitonia and Eucalyptus species.

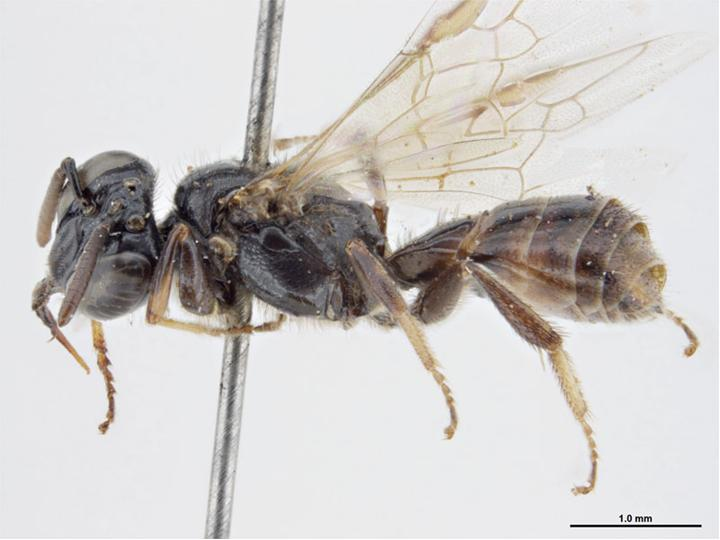
Male
