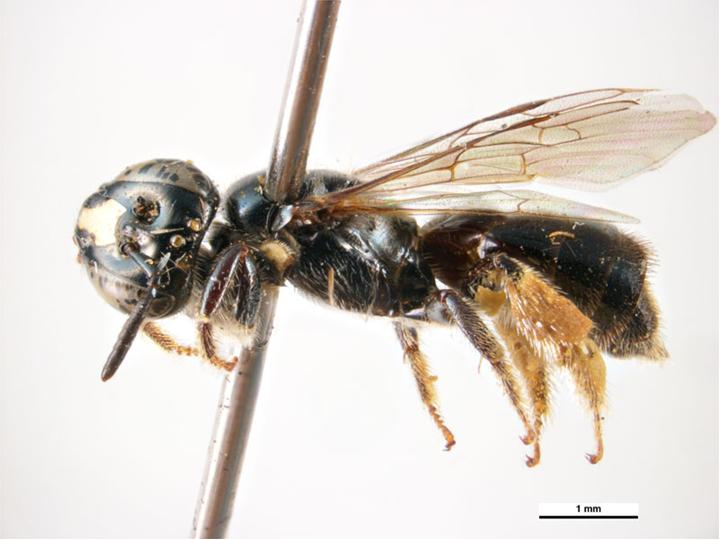
- Female

Scientific classification
- Kingdom: Animalia
- Phylum: Arthropoda
- Clade: Pancrustacea
- Class: Insecta
- Order: Hymenoptera
- Family: Apidae
- Genus: Exoneura
- Species: E. botanica

Binomial name
- Exoneura botanica Cockerell, 1905

= Exoneura botanica =

Species of bee

Exoneura botanica, or Exoneura (Brevineura) botanica, is a species of reed bee in the tribe Allodapini. It is endemic to Australia. It was described in 1905 by British-American entomologist Theodore Dru Alison Cockerell.

== Distribution and habitat ==
The species occurs in New South Wales. The type locality is Botany, Sydney.

== Behaviour ==
The adults are flying mellivores.
