= Exoneura incerta =

Scientific classification
- Kingdom: Animalia
- Phylum: Arthropoda
- Clade: Pancrustacea
- Class: Insecta
- Order: Hymenoptera
- Family: Apidae
- Genus: Exoneura
- Species: E. incerta

Binomial name
- Exoneura incerta Cockerell, 1918

Synonyms
- Exoneura hackeri incerta Cockerell, 1918

Species of bee

Exoneura incerta, or Exoneura (Exoneura) incerta, is a species of reed bee in the tribe Allodapini. It is endemic to Australia. It was described in 1918 by British-American entomologist Theodore Dru Alison Cockerell.

== Distribution and habitat ==
The species occurs in south-east Queensland. The type locality is Brisbane.

== Behaviour ==
The adults are flying mellivores.
