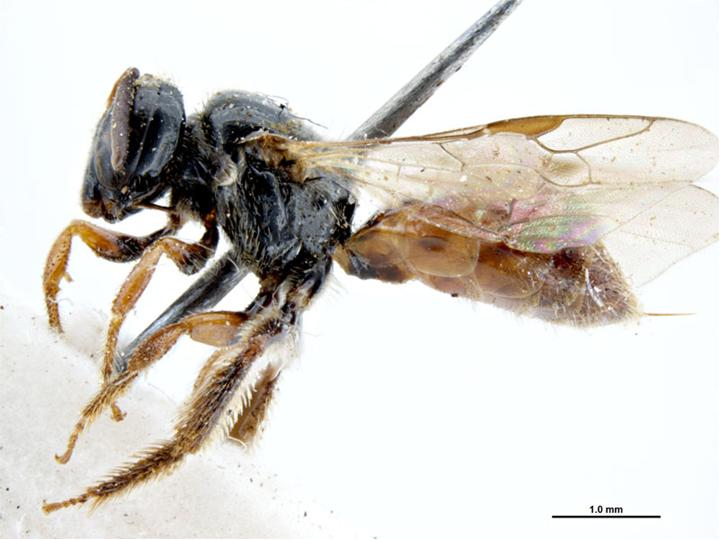
- Female

Scientific classification
- Kingdom: Animalia
- Phylum: Arthropoda
- Clade: Pancrustacea
- Class: Insecta
- Order: Hymenoptera
- Family: Apidae
- Genus: Exoneura
- Species: E. obliterata

Binomial name
- Exoneura obliterata Cockerell, 1913

Synonyms
- Exoneura angophorae obliterata Cockerell, 1913

= Exoneura obliterata =

Species of bee

Exoneura obliterata, or Exoneura (Exoneura) obliterata, is a species of reed bee in the tribe Allodapini. It is endemic to Australia. It was described in 1913 by British-American entomologist Theodore Dru Alison Cockerell.

== Distribution and habitat ==
The species occurs in eastern mainland Australia. The type locality is Sunnybank in Brisbane.

== Behaviour ==
The adults are flying mellivores with sedentary larvae. They nest in the dead, dry stems of reeds. Two or more adult females may occupy one nest, though not all females lay eggs. All the immature stages may be found in the communal chamber, with the larvae fed progressively. Flowering plants visited by the bees include Arctotheca, Boronia, Daviesia, Helichrysum, Hibbertia, Jacksonia, Leucopogon, Melaleuca, Pultenaea, Rapistrum, Swainsona, Wahlenbergia and Leptospermum species.
