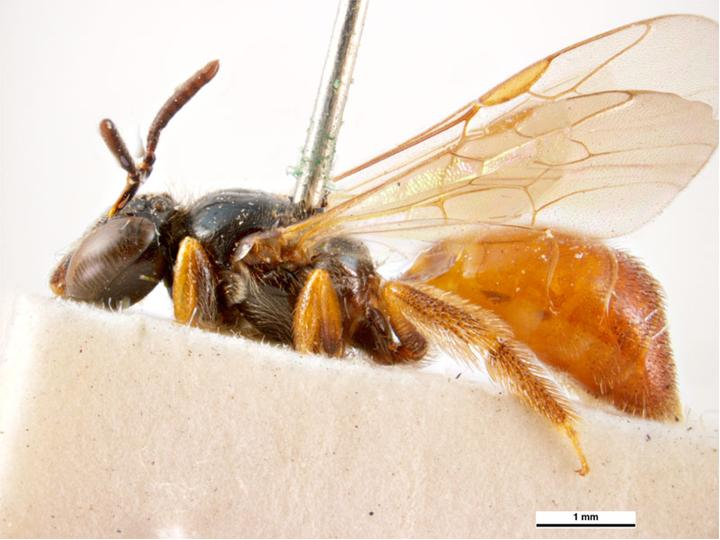
- Female

Scientific classification
- Kingdom: Animalia
- Phylum: Arthropoda
- Clade: Pancrustacea
- Class: Insecta
- Order: Hymenoptera
- Family: Apidae
- Genus: Exoneura
- Species: E. baculifera

Binomial name
- Exoneura baculifera Cockerell, 1922

= Exoneura baculifera =

Species of bee

Exoneura baculifera, or Exoneura (Exoneura) baculifera, is a species of reed bee in the tribe Allodapini. It is endemic to Australia. It was described in 1922 by British-American entomologist Theodore Dru Alison Cockerell.

== Description ==
The body length of the female syntype is "somewhat over" 6 mm. The head and thorax are black, the abdomen dark chestnut-red.

== Distribution and habitat ==
The species occurs in eastern Australia. The type locality is Lamington National Park in south-east Queensland; other published localities are Woy Woy, Gladesville and Lindfield in New South Wales, and Gorae West in Victoria.

== Behaviour ==
The adults are flying mellivores with sedentary larvae. They nest in dead, dry, plant stems and dry timber, including Erythrina on rainforest margins. Two or more adult females may occupy one nest, though not all females lay eggs. All immature stages are found in the communal chamber, with the larvae fed progressively. Flowering plants visited by the bees include Claoxylon, Leucopogon and Lomatia species.

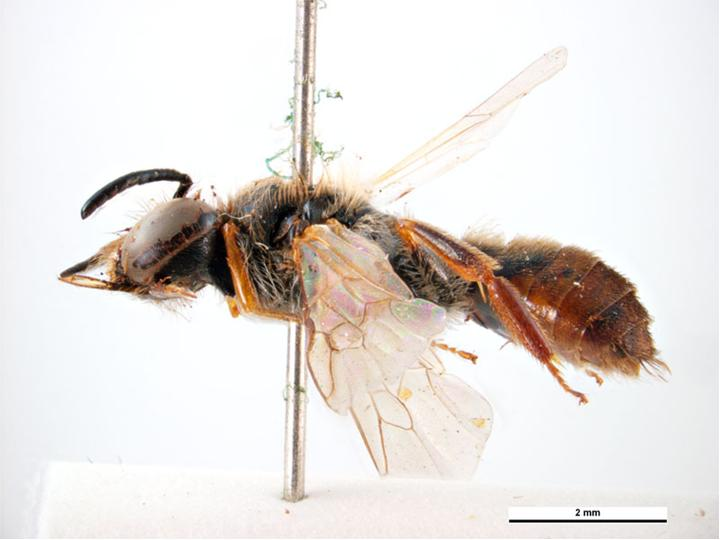
Male
