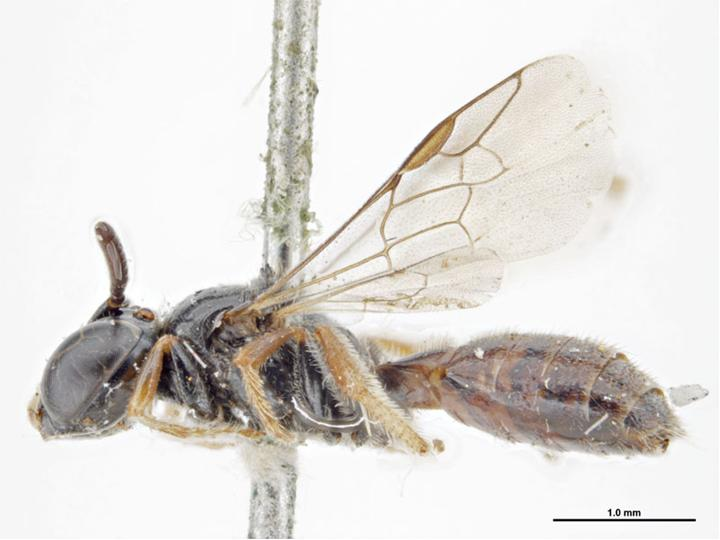
- Male

Scientific classification
- Kingdom: Animalia
- Phylum: Arthropoda
- Clade: Pancrustacea
- Class: Insecta
- Order: Hymenoptera
- Family: Apidae
- Genus: Exoneura
- Species: E. clarissima

Binomial name
- Exoneura clarissima Cockerell, 1915

= Exoneura clarissima =

Species of bee

Exoneura clarissima, or Exoneura (Brevineura) clarissima, is a species of reed bee in the tribe Allodapini. It is endemic to Australia. It was described in 1915 by British-American entomologist Theodore Dru Alison Cockerell.

== Distribution and habitat ==
The species occurs in New South Wales. The type locality is Yarrawin.

== Behaviour ==
The adults are flying mellivores.
