= Exoneura hackeri =

Scientific classification
- Kingdom: Animalia
- Phylum: Arthropoda
- Clade: Pancrustacea
- Class: Insecta
- Order: Hymenoptera
- Family: Apidae
- Genus: Exoneura
- Species: E. hackeri

Binomial name
- Exoneura hackeri Cockerell, 1913

Synonyms
- Exoneura angophorae hackeri Cockerell, 1913; Exoneura insularis Cockerell, 1914

Species of bee

Exoneura hackeri, or Exoneura (Exoneura) hackeri, is a species of reed bee in the tribe Allodapini. It is endemic to Australia. It was described in 1913 by British-American entomologist Theodore Dru Alison Cockerell.

== Distribution and habitat ==
The species occurs in eastern Queensland. Type localities include Sunnybank in Brisbane, and Stradbroke Island.

== Behaviour ==
The adults are flying mellivores with sedentary larvae. They nest in the dead, dry stems of plants on rainforest margins. Two or more adult females may occupy one nest, though not all females lay eggs. All the immature stages may be found in the communal chamber, with the larvae fed progressively. Flowering plants visited by the bees include Hibbertia and Leptospermum species.
