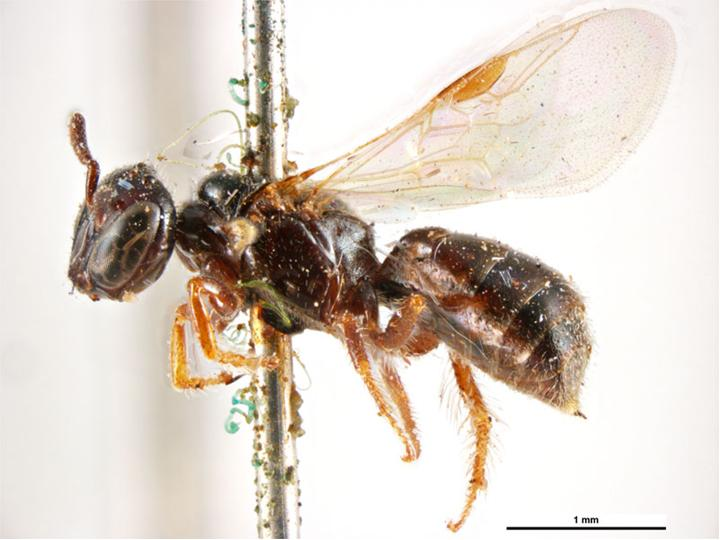
- Female

Scientific classification
- Kingdom: Animalia
- Phylum: Arthropoda
- Clade: Pancrustacea
- Class: Insecta
- Order: Hymenoptera
- Family: Apidae
- Genus: Exoneura
- Species: E. ploratula

Binomial name
- Exoneura ploratula Cockerell, 1912

= Exoneura ploratula =

Species of bee

Exoneura ploratula, or Exoneura (Brevineura) ploratula, is a species of reed bee in the tribe Allodapini. It is endemic to Australia. It was described in 1912 by British-American entomologist Theodore Dru Alison Cockerell.

== Distribution and habitat ==
The species occurs in eastern mainland Australia. The type locality is Sydney.

== Behaviour ==
The adults are flying mellivores with sedentary larvae. They nest in dead, dry plant stems. Two or more adult females may occupy one nest, though not all females lay eggs. All the immature stages may be found in the communal chamber, with the larvae fed progressively. Flowering plants visited by the bees include Angophora, Bursaria, Callistemon, Jacksonia and Xanthorrhoea species.

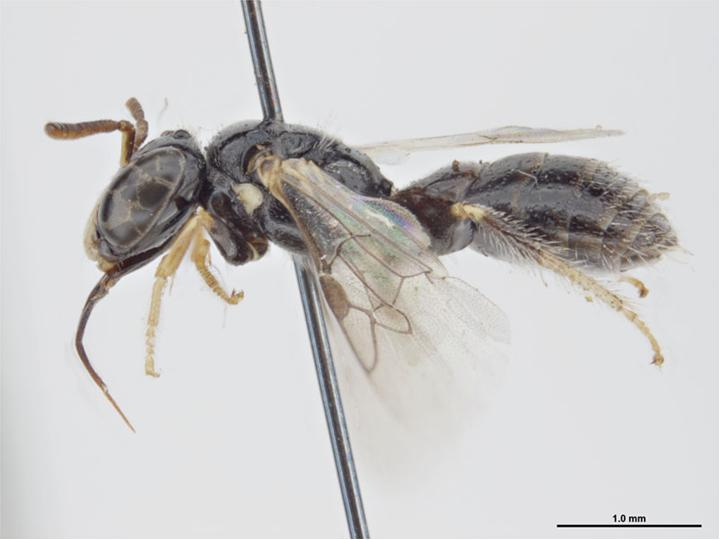
Male
