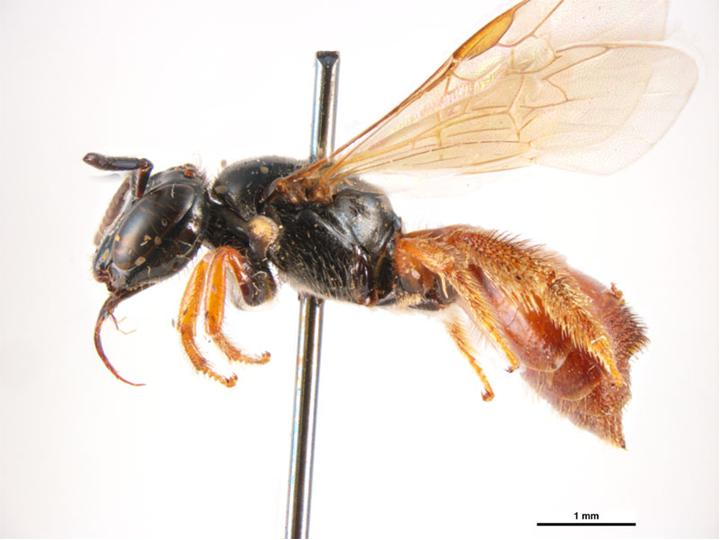
- Female

Scientific classification
- Kingdom: Animalia
- Phylum: Arthropoda
- Clade: Pancrustacea
- Class: Insecta
- Order: Hymenoptera
- Family: Apidae
- Genus: Exoneura
- Species: E. tau

Binomial name
- Exoneura tau Cockerell, 1905

= Exoneura tau =

Species of bee

Exoneura tau, or Exoneura (Brevineura) tau, is a species of reed bee in the tribe Allodapini. It is endemic to Australia. It was described in 1905 by British-American entomologist Theodore Dru Alison Cockerell.

== Distribution and habitat ==
The species occurs in eastern Australia. The type locality is thought to be Mosman Bay, Sydney.

== Behaviour ==
The adults are flying mellivores with sedentary larvae. They nest in dead, dry plant stems. Two or more adult females may occupy one nest, though not all females lay eggs. All the immature stages may be found in the communal chamber, with the larvae fed progressively. Flowering plants visited by the bees include Angophora, Jacksonia, Leptospermum and Pultenaea species.

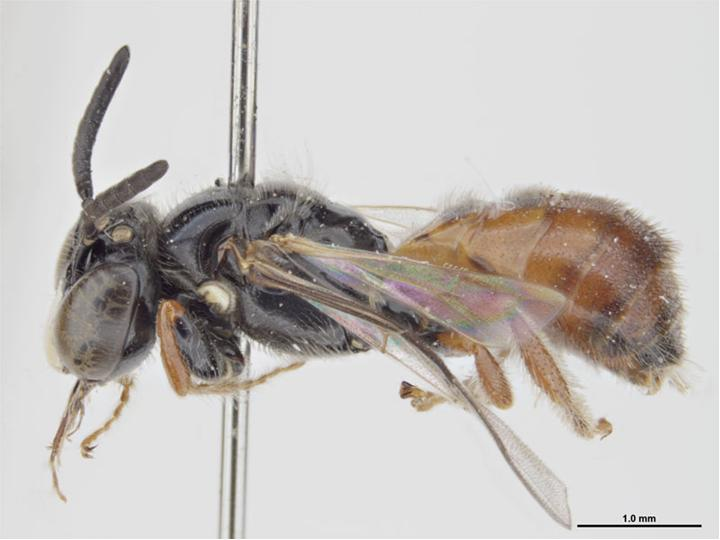
Male
