= Exoneura turneri =

Scientific classification
- Kingdom: Animalia
- Phylum: Arthropoda
- Clade: Pancrustacea
- Class: Insecta
- Order: Hymenoptera
- Family: Apidae
- Genus: Exoneura
- Species: E. turneri

Binomial name
- Exoneura turneri Cockerell, 1914

Species of bee

Exoneura turneri, or Exoneura (Exoneura) turneri, is a species of reed bee in the tribe Allodapini. It is endemic to Australia. It was described in 1914 by British-American entomologist Theodore Dru Alison Cockerell.

== Distribution and habitat ==
The species occurs in Tasmania. The type locality is Eaglehawk Neck.

== Behaviour ==
The adults are flying mellivores.
