= Exoneura diversipes =

Scientific classification
- Kingdom: Animalia
- Phylum: Arthropoda
- Clade: Pancrustacea
- Class: Insecta
- Order: Hymenoptera
- Family: Apidae
- Genus: Exoneura
- Species: E. diversipes

Binomial name
- Exoneura diversipes Cockerell, 1922

Species of bee

Exoneura diversipes, or Exoneura (Exoneura) diversipes, is a species of reed bee in the tribe Allodapini. It is endemic to Australia. It was described in 1922 by British-American entomologist Theodore Dru Alison Cockerell.

== Description ==
The body length of males is 7 mm. Colouration is mainly black.

== Distribution and habitat ==
The species occurs in south-eastern Queensland. The type locality is Lamington National Park.

== Behaviour ==
The adults are flying mellivores.
