= Exoneura tasmanica =

Scientific classification
- Kingdom: Animalia
- Phylum: Arthropoda
- Clade: Pancrustacea
- Class: Insecta
- Order: Hymenoptera
- Family: Apidae
- Genus: Exoneura
- Species: E. tasmanica

Binomial name
- Exoneura tasmanica Cockerell, 1930

Species of bee

Exoneura tasmanica, or Exoneura (Exoneura) tasmanica, is a species of reed bee in the tribe Allodapini. It is endemic to Australia. It was described in 1930 by British-American entomologist Theodore Dru Alison Cockerell.

== Description ==
The body length is 7 mm. The head and thorax are glossy black, the abdomen mostly dark red.

== Distribution and habitat ==
The species occurs in Tasmania. The type locality is Windermere.

== Behaviour ==
The adults are flying mellivores.
