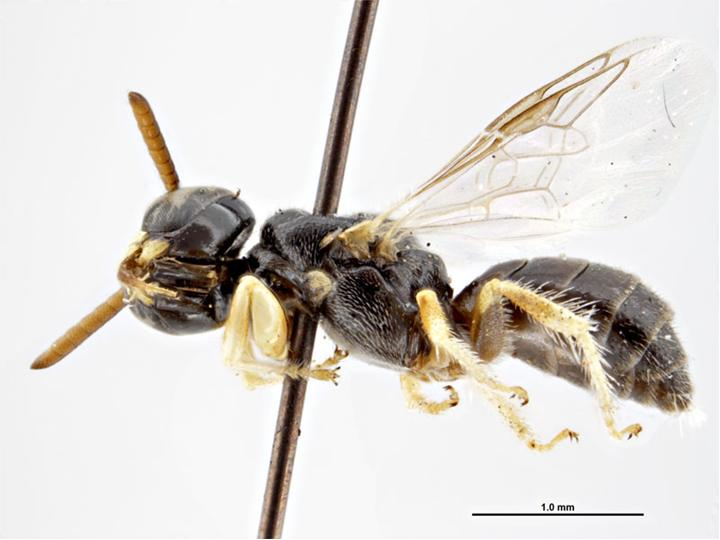
- Male

Scientific classification
- Kingdom: Animalia
- Phylum: Arthropoda
- Clade: Pancrustacea
- Class: Insecta
- Order: Hymenoptera
- Family: Apidae
- Genus: Exoneura
- Species: E. gracilis

Binomial name
- Exoneura gracilis Cockerell, 1918

= Exoneura gracilis =

Species of bee

Exoneura gracilis, or Exoneura (Brevineura) gracilis, is a species of reed bee in the tribe Allodapini. It is endemic to Australia. It was described in 1918 by British-American entomologist Theodore Dru Alison Cockerell.

== Description ==
The body length of the holotype female is 4.5 mm. The colour is mainly glossy black.

== Distribution and habitat ==
The species occurs in south-east Queensland. The type locality is Brisbane; another published locality is Capalaba.

== Behaviour ==
The adults are flying mellivores. They nest in dead, dry plant stems. Two or more adult females may occupy one nest, though not all females lay eggs. All the immature stages are found in the communal chamber, with the larvae fed progressively. Flowering plants visited by the bees include Callistemon species.

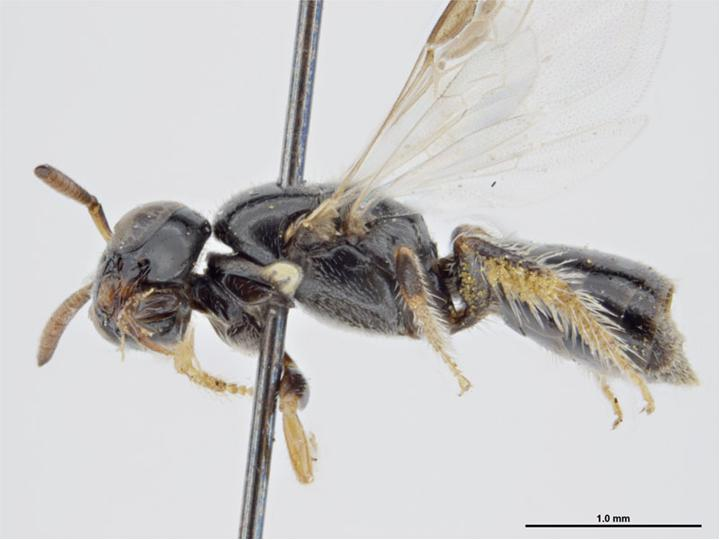
Female
