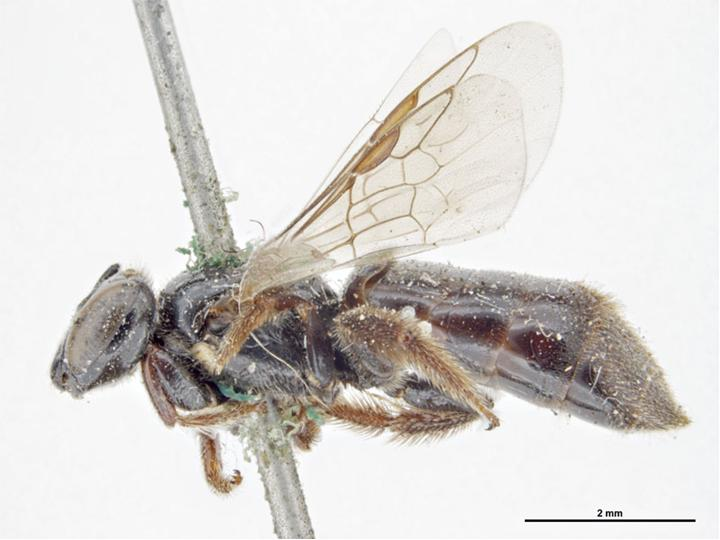
- Female

Scientific classification
- Kingdom: Animalia
- Phylum: Arthropoda
- Clade: Pancrustacea
- Class: Insecta
- Order: Hymenoptera
- Family: Apidae
- Genus: Exoneura
- Species: E. aterrima

Binomial name
- Exoneura aterrima Cockerell, 1916

Synonyms
- Exoneura botanica aterrima Cockerell, 1916

= Exoneura aterrima =

Species of bee

Exoneura aterrima, or Exoneura (Brevineura) aterrima, is a species of reed bee in the tribe Allodapini. It is endemic to Australia. It was described in 1916 by British-American entomologist Theodore Dru Alison Cockerell.

== Distribution and habitat ==
The species occurs in south-east Queensland. The type locality is Brisbane.

== Behaviour ==
The adults are flying mellivores with sedentary larvae. They nest in the dead, dry flowering stalks of Xanthorrhoea grasstrees. Two or more adult females may occupy one nest, though not all females lay eggs. All the immature stages are found in the communal chamber, with the larvae fed progressively. Flowering plants visited by the bees include Callistemon species.
