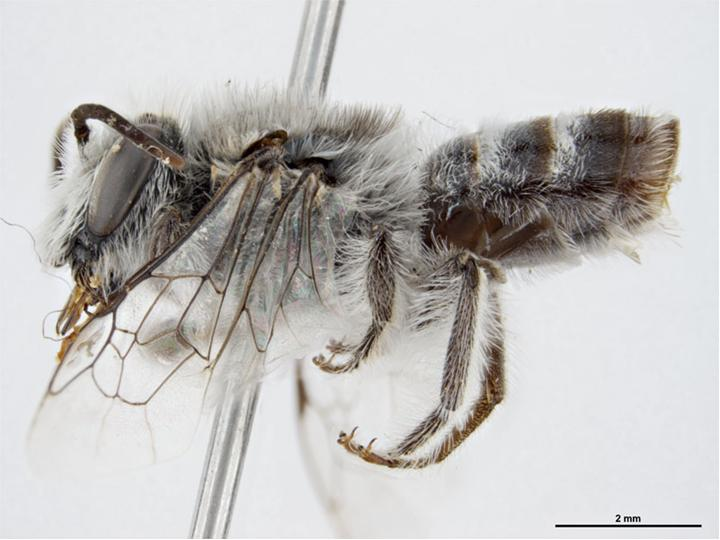
- Male

Scientific classification
- Kingdom: Animalia
- Phylum: Arthropoda
- Clade: Pancrustacea
- Class: Insecta
- Order: Hymenoptera
- Family: Colletidae
- Genus: Leioproctus
- Species: L. albopilosus

Binomial name
- Leioproctus albopilosus (Rayment, 1930)

Synonyms
- Paracolletes albopilosus Rayment, 1930

= Leioproctus albopilosus =

Species of bee

Leioproctus albopilosus, or Leioproctus (Goniocolletes) albopilosus, is a species of bee in the family Colletidae and subfamily Colletinae. It is endemic to Australia. It was described by Australian entomologist Tarlton Rayment in 1930.

== Description ==
Male body length is about 10 mm. Integumental colouration is mainly black, the hair white.

== Distribution and habitat ==
The species occurs in south-west Western Australia. The type locality is Perth.

== Behaviour ==
The adults are flying mellivores. Flowering plants visited by the bees include Stylidium and Leptospermum species.
