= Exoneura obscuripes =

Scientific classification
- Kingdom: Animalia
- Phylum: Arthropoda
- Clade: Pancrustacea
- Class: Insecta
- Order: Hymenoptera
- Family: Apidae
- Genus: Exoneura
- Species: E. obscuripes

Binomial name
- Exoneura obscuripes Michener, 1963

Species of bee

Exoneura obscuripes, or Exoneura (Exoneura) obscuripes, is a species of reed bee in the tribe Allodapini. It is endemic to Australia. It was described in 1963 by American entomologist Charles Duncan Michener.

== Description ==
The body length of the female holotype is 8 mm. The head and thorax are black, the abdomen mostly dark red.

== Distribution and habitat ==
The species occurs in south-eastern Queensland. The type locality is Binna Burra in the Lamington National Park.

== Behaviour ==
The adults are flying mellivores. They nest in the stems of vines in rainforest.
