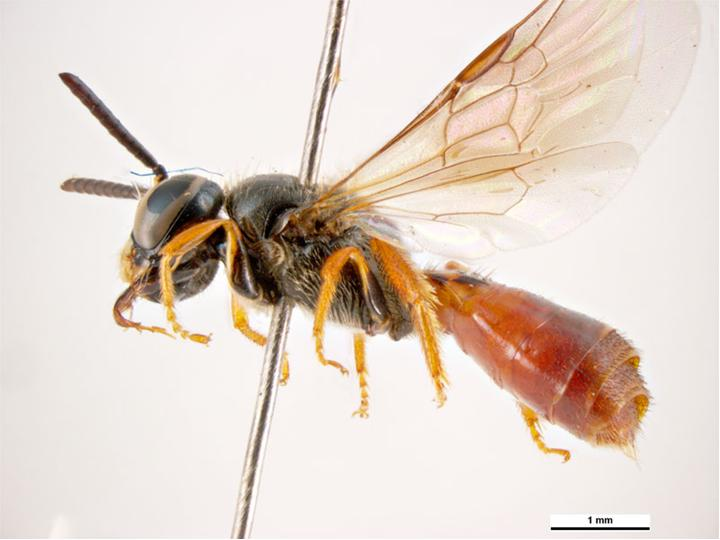
- Male

Scientific classification
- Kingdom: Animalia
- Phylum: Arthropoda
- Clade: Pancrustacea
- Class: Insecta
- Order: Hymenoptera
- Family: Apidae
- Genus: Exoneura
- Species: E. melaena

Binomial name
- Exoneura melaena Cockerell, 1918

= Exoneura melaena =

Species of bee

Exoneura melaena, or Exoneura (Brevineura) melaena, is a species of reed bee in the tribe Allodapini. It is endemic to Australia. It was described in 1918 by British-American entomologist Theodore Dru Alison Cockerell.

== Description ==
The body length of the female holotype is 5 mm.

== Distribution and habitat ==
The species occurs in south-east Queensland. The type locality is Caloundra.

== Behaviour ==
The adults are flying mellivores.

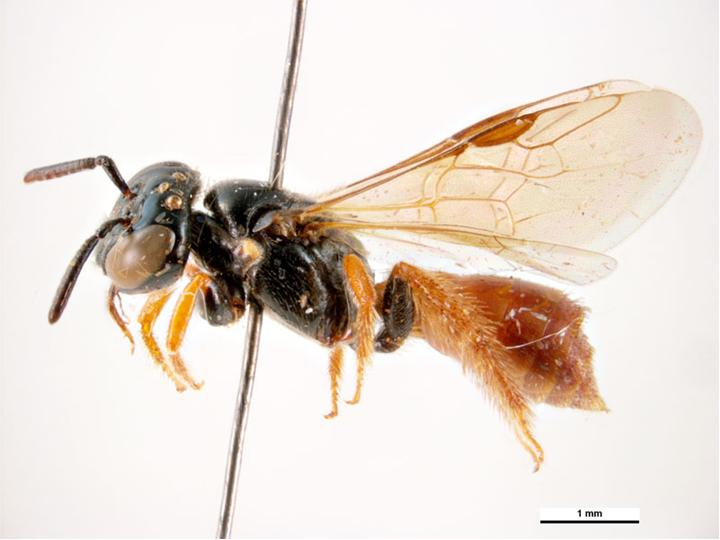
Female
