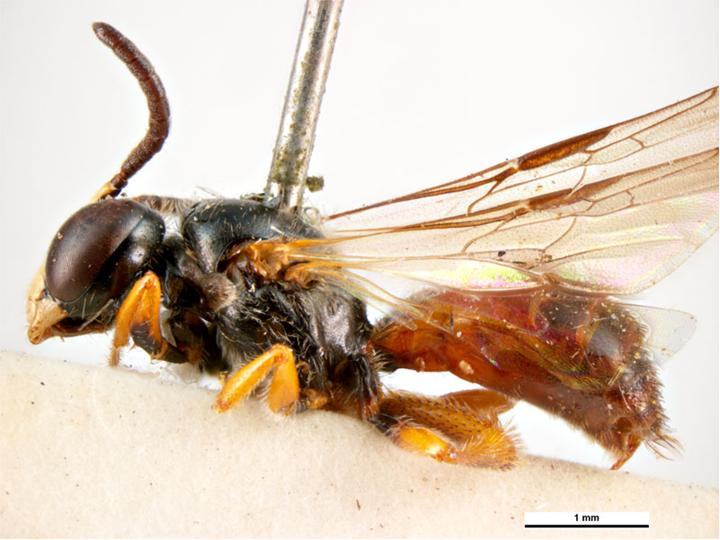
- Male

Scientific classification
- Kingdom: Animalia
- Phylum: Arthropoda
- Clade: Pancrustacea
- Class: Insecta
- Order: Hymenoptera
- Family: Apidae
- Genus: Exoneura
- Species: E. angophorae

Binomial name
- Exoneura angophorae Cockerell, 1912

= Exoneura angophorae =

Species of bee

Exoneura angophorae, or Exoneura (Exoneura) angophorae, is a species of reed bee in the tribe Allodapini. It is endemic to Australia. It was described in 1912 by British-American entomologist Theodore Dru Alison Cockerell.

== Distribution and habitat ==
The species occurs in eastern mainland Australia. The type locality is Sydney.

== Behaviour ==
The adults are flying mellivores with sedentary larvae. They nest in dead, dry plant stems, such as those of Erythrina and Lantana, and the flowering stalks of Xanthorrhoea grasstrees. Two or more adult females may occupy one nest, though not all females lay eggs. All the immature stages may be found in the communal chamber, with the larvae fed progressively. Flowering plants visited by the bees include Angophora species.

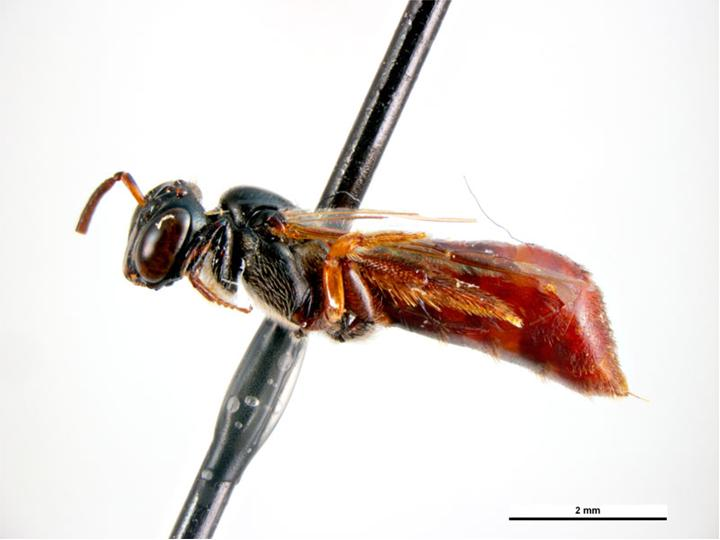
Female
