= Hylaeus blanchae =

Scientific classification
- Kingdom: Animalia
- Phylum: Arthropoda
- Clade: Pancrustacea
- Class: Insecta
- Order: Hymenoptera
- Family: Colletidae
- Genus: Hylaeus
- Species: H. blanchae

Binomial name
- Hylaeus blanchae Rayment, 1953

Species of bee

Hylaeus blanchae, or Hylaeus (Prosopisteron) blanchae, is a species of bee in the family Colletidae and subfamily Hylaeinae. It is endemic to Australia. It was described by Australian entomologist Tarlton Rayment in 1953.

== Description ==
Female body length is about 6 mm. Integumental colouration is mainly black.

== Distribution and habitat ==
The species occurs in Tasmania. The type locality is the Great Lake, in the Central Highlands region.

== Behaviour ==
The adults are flying mellivores. Flowering plants visited by the bees include Helichrysum species.
