= Exoneura abstrusa =

Scientific classification
- Kingdom: Animalia
- Phylum: Arthropoda
- Clade: Pancrustacea
- Class: Insecta
- Order: Hymenoptera
- Family: Apidae
- Genus: Exoneura
- Species: E. abstrusa

Binomial name
- Exoneura abstrusa Cockerell, 1922

Species of bee

Exoneura abstrusa , or Exoneura (Exoneura) abstrusa , is a species of reed bee in the tribe Allodapini. It is endemic to Australia. It was described in 1922 by British-American entomologist Theodore Dru Alison Cockerell.

== Description ==
The body length of the male holotype is 6.5 mm. The head, thorax and abdomen are black.

== Distribution and habitat ==
The species occurs in eastern Australia. The type locality is Caloundra in south-east Queensland; another published locality is Woy Woy on the Central Coast of New South Wales.

== Behaviour ==
The adults are flying mellivores. They nest in dead, dry, woody twigs. Two or more adult females may occupy one nest, though not all females lay eggs. All immature stages are found in the communal chamber, with the larvae fed progressively.
