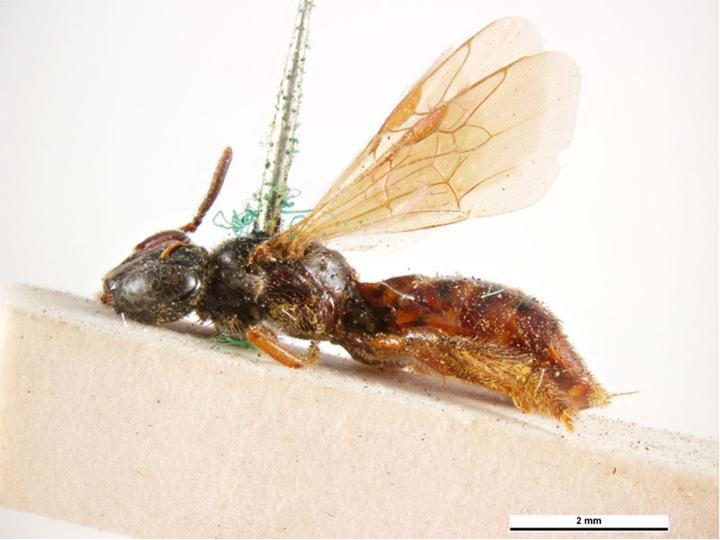
- Female

Scientific classification
- Kingdom: Animalia
- Phylum: Arthropoda
- Clade: Pancrustacea
- Class: Insecta
- Order: Hymenoptera
- Family: Apidae
- Genus: Exoneura
- Species: E. fultoni

Binomial name
- Exoneura fultoni Cockerell, 1913

= Exoneura fultoni =

Species of bee

Exoneura fultoni, or Exoneura (Exoneura) fultoni, is a species of reed bee in the tribe Allodapini. It is endemic to Australia. It was described in 1913 by British-American entomologist Theodore Dru Alison Cockerell.

== Distribution and habitat ==
The species occurs in Victoria. Published localities include Portland and the Grampians. The type locality is Croydon.

== Behaviour ==
The adults are flying mellivores with sedentary larvae. They nest in the dead, dry stems of sword grass. Two or more adult females may occupy one nest, though not all females lay eggs. All the immature stages may be found in the communal chamber, with the larvae fed progressively. Flowering plants visited by the bees include Leucopogon species.
