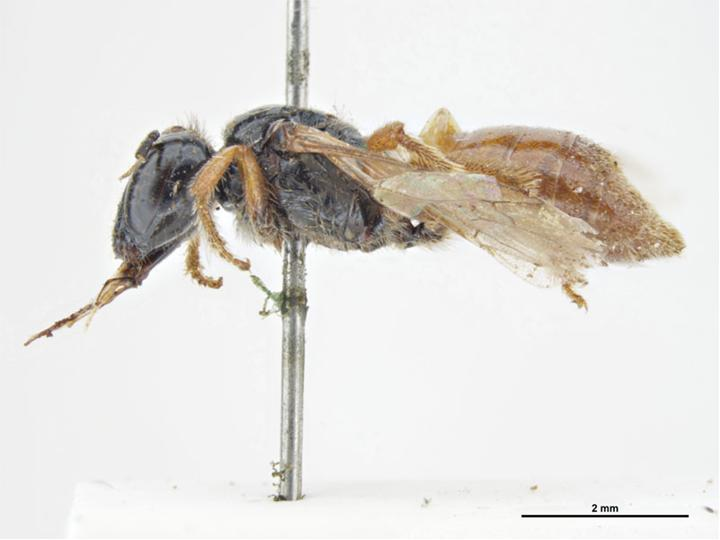

Scientific classification
- Kingdom: Animalia
- Phylum: Arthropoda
- Clade: Pancrustacea
- Class: Insecta
- Order: Hymenoptera
- Family: Apidae
- Genus: Exoneura
- Species: E. nigrescens

Binomial name
- Exoneura nigrescens Friese, 1899

Synonyms
- Exoneura bicolor nigrescens Friese, 1899

= Exoneura nigrescens =

Species of bee

Exoneura nigrescens is a species of reed bee in the tribe Allodapini. It is endemic to Australia. It was described in 1899 by German entomologist Heinrich Friese.

== Distribution and habitat ==
The species occurs in Victoria, as well as in eastern New South Wales. The type locality is Sydney.

== Behaviour ==
The adults are flying mellivores.
