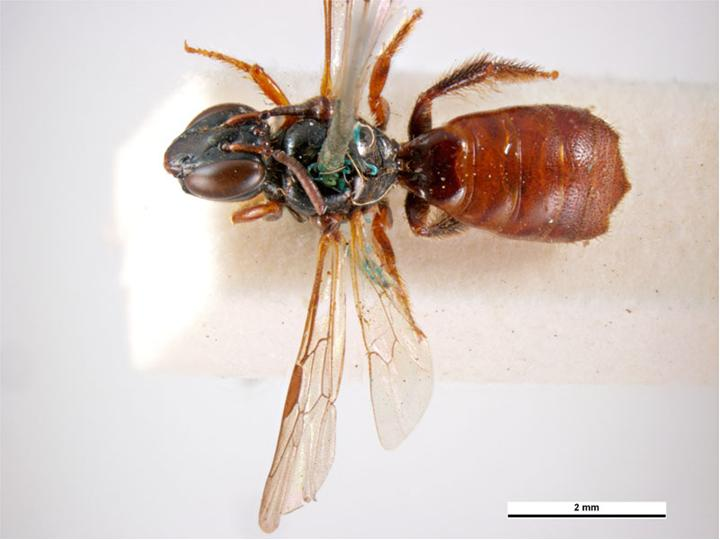
- Female

Scientific classification
- Kingdom: Animalia
- Phylum: Arthropoda
- Clade: Pancrustacea
- Class: Insecta
- Order: Hymenoptera
- Family: Apidae
- Genus: Exoneura
- Species: E. pictifrons

Binomial name
- Exoneura pictifrons Alfken, 1907

Synonyms
- Exoneura angophorae occidentalis Cockerell, 1914

= Exoneura pictifrons =

Species of bee

Exoneura pictifrons or Exoneura (Exoneura) pictifrons is a species of reed bee in the tribe Allodapini. It is endemic to Australia. It was described in 1907 by German entomologist Johann Dietrich Alfken.

== Distribution and habitat ==
The species occurs in south-west Western Australia. The type locality is Mundijong.

== Behaviour ==
The adults are flying mellivores with sedentary larvae. They nest in the dead, dry flowering stalks of Xanthorrhoea grasstrees. Two or more adult females may be present in one nest, though not all females lay eggs. All immature stages may be found in the communal nesting chamber.
