= Allodape =

Scientific classification
- Kingdom: Animalia
- Phylum: Arthropoda
- Clade: Pancrustacea
- Class: Insecta
- Order: Hymenoptera
- Family: Apidae
- Tribe: Allodapini
- Genus: Allodape; Lepeletier & Serville, 1825

Genus of insect

Allodape is a genus of bees belonging to the family Apidae.

The species of this genus are found in Africa.

== Species ==
Species:

- Allodape armatipes Friese, 1924
- Allodape australissima Michener, 1975
- Allodape brachycephala Michener, 1971
