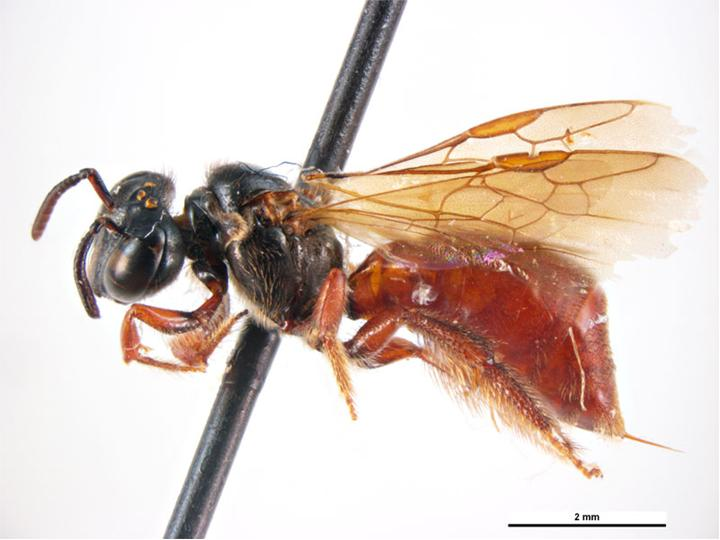
- Female

Scientific classification
- Kingdom: Animalia
- Phylum: Arthropoda
- Clade: Pancrustacea
- Class: Insecta
- Order: Hymenoptera
- Family: Apidae
- Genus: Exoneura
- Species: E. bicincta

Binomial name
- Exoneura bicincta Rayment, 1935

= Exoneura bicincta =

Species of bee

Exoneura bicincta, or Exoneura (Exoneura) bicincta, is a species of reed bee in the tribe Allodapini. It is endemic to Australia. It was described in 1935 by Australian entomologist Tarlton Rayment.

== Description ==
The body length is 6 mm. The head and thorax are glossy black, the abdomen mostly chestnut-red.

== Distribution and habitat ==
The species occurs in Victoria. The type locality is Mount William. Other published localities include the Dandenong Ranges, Cobboboonee National Park and Gorae West.

== Behaviour ==
The adults are flying mellivores with sedentary larvae. They nest in the dead, dry stems or fronds of Rubus brambles, Xanthorrhoea grasstrees, Dicksonia tree ferns, and in deserted beetle galleries in dry timber. Two or more adult females may occupy one nest, though not all females lay eggs. All immature stages are found in the communal chamber, with the larvae fed progressively.
