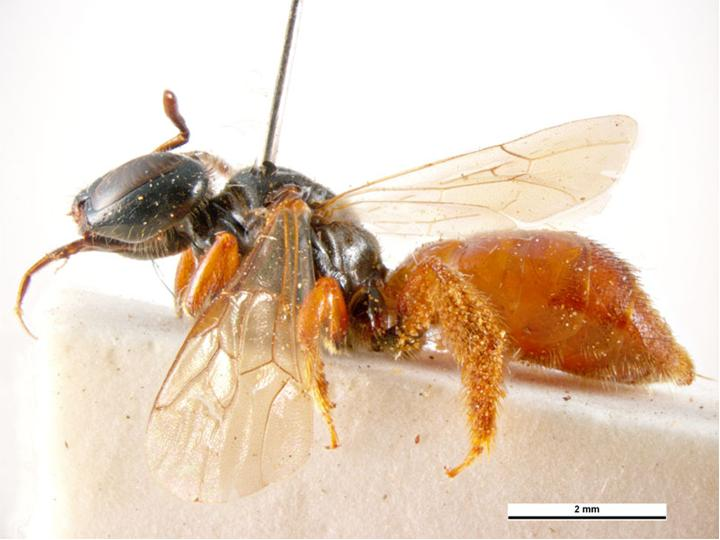
- Female

Scientific classification
- Kingdom: Animalia
- Phylum: Arthropoda
- Clade: Pancrustacea
- Class: Insecta
- Order: Hymenoptera
- Family: Apidae
- Genus: Exoneura
- Species: E. hamulata

Binomial name
- Exoneura hamulata Cockerell, 1905

= Exoneura hamulata =

Species of bee

Exoneura hamulata, or Exoneura (Exoneura) hamulata , is a species of reed bee in the tribe Allodapini. It is endemic to Australia. It was described in 1905 by British-American entomologist Theodore Dru Alison Cockerell.

== Distribution and habitat ==
The species occurs in eastern and south-western Australia. The type locality is thought to be Mosman Bay, Sydney.

== Behaviour ==
The adults are flying mellivores with sedentary larvae. They nest in the dead, dry stems of Callistemon, Lantana and Rubus species, in the dead fronds of Dicksonia treeferns, and in the flowering stalks of Xanthorrhoea grasstrees. Two or more adult females may occupy one nest, though not all females lay eggs. All the immature stages may be found in the communal chamber, with the larvae fed progressively. Flowering plants visited by the bees include Leucopogon, Persoonia, Prasophyllum, Rubus, Stylidium and Swainsona species.
