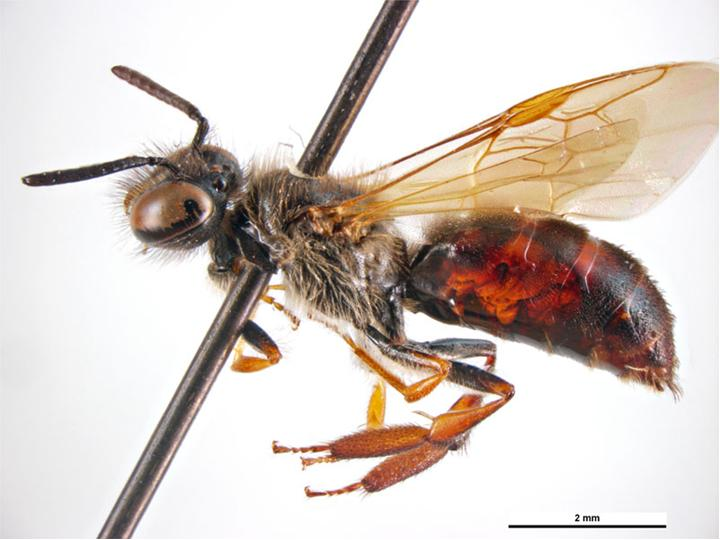
- Male

Scientific classification
- Kingdom: Animalia
- Phylum: Arthropoda
- Clade: Pancrustacea
- Class: Insecta
- Order: Hymenoptera
- Family: Apidae
- Genus: Exoneura
- Species: E. bicolor

Binomial name
- Exoneura bicolor Smith, 1854

= Exoneura bicolor =

Species of bee

Exoneura bicolor or Exoneura (Exoneura) bicolor, also known as the bicoloured reed bee, is a species of reed bee in the tribe Allodapini. It is endemic to Australia. It was described in 1854 by English entomologist Frederick Smith.

== Distribution and habitat ==
The species occurs in New South Wales, Tasmania, Victoria and southern Queensland.

== Behaviour ==
The adults are flying mellivores with sedentary larvae. They are semisocial insects that build nests in the dead, dry stems and fronds of various plants. Two or more females may occupy a nest and lay eggs in a communal chamber. Flowering plants visited by the bees include Boronia, Daviesia, Helichrysum, Hypochaeris, Jacksonia, and Pultenaea species.

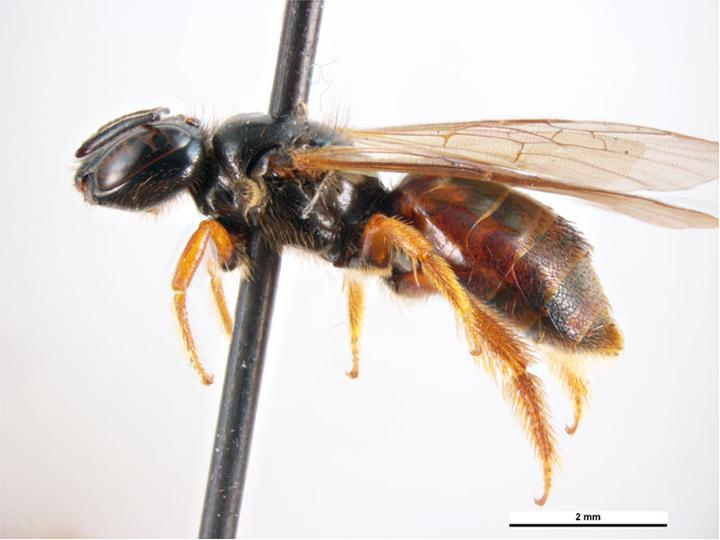
Female
