= Ethonion =

Scientific classification
- Kingdom: Animalia
- Phylum: Arthropoda
- Class: Insecta
- Order: Coleoptera
- Suborder: Polyphaga
- Infraorder: Elateriformia
- Family: Buprestidae
- Subfamily: Agrilinae
- Tribe: Coraebini
- Subtribe: Ethoniina; Majer, 2001
- Genus: Ethonion; Kuban, 2000

Genus of beetles

Ethonion is a genus of beetles in the family Buprestidae, subfamily Buprestinae, tribe Coraebini, and subtribe Ethoniina containing the following species:

- Ethonion breve (Carter, 1923)
- Ethonion corpulentum (Boheman, 1858)
- Ethonion fissiceps (Kirby, 1818)
- Ethonion jessicae (Hawkeswood & Turner, 1994)
- Ethonion leai (Carter, 1924)
- Ethonion maculatum (Blackburn, 1887)
- Ethonion reichei (Chevrolat, 1838)
- Ethonion roei (Saunders, 1868)
