= Tarlton Rayment =

Australian scientist (1882–1964)

Tarlton Rayment FRZS
- Born: Percy Tarlton Rayment; 27 November 1882
- Died: 17 June 1964 (aged 81)
- Occupations: artist; author; naturalist
- Known for: pioneering studies of Australia's native bees
- Scientific career
- Fields: entomology

Percy Tarlton Rayment FRZS (27 November 1882 – 17 June 1964) was an Australian artist, author, broadcaster, poet, naturalist, entomologist and beekeeper. He is especially renowned for his extensive pioneering studies of Australia's native bees.

Apart from numerous papers and articles in the entomological literature and in natural history journals and popular magazines including Walkabout, books authored by Rayment include:

- 1916 - Money in Bees in Australasia. Whitcombe & Tombs: Melbourne. (Handbook to beekeeping).
- 1933 - The Prince of the Totem. Robertson & Mullens: Melbourne. (Collection of Aboriginal tales and legends for children).
- 1935 - A Cluster of Bees. Endeavour Press: Sydney. (Major monograph comprising 60 essays on Australian bees).
- 1937 - The Valley of the Sky. Ivor Nicholson & Watson: London. (Novel).
- 1945 - Eagles and Earthlings. A metrical tribute to the air crews in the war. Author. (Poetry).
- 1946 - Profitable Honey Plants of Australasia. Whitcombe & Tombs: Melbourne. (Handbook to beekeeping).
- 1953 - Bees of the Portland District. Portland Field Naturalists Club.

Although Rayment is currently best remembered as a person who wrote expertly about beekeeping in Australia, he spent a considerable amount of time with the Aruntja people of Central Australia. He had no formal training as an anthropologist, but his wide-ranging intelligence was a good alternative to such training. He was sufficiently accepted by the Aruntja people that, although a white-man, he was regarded as an honorary member of their tribe.

In The Prince of the Totem, Rayment himself drew the striking black-and-white illustrations that vividly depict the characters, and events.
