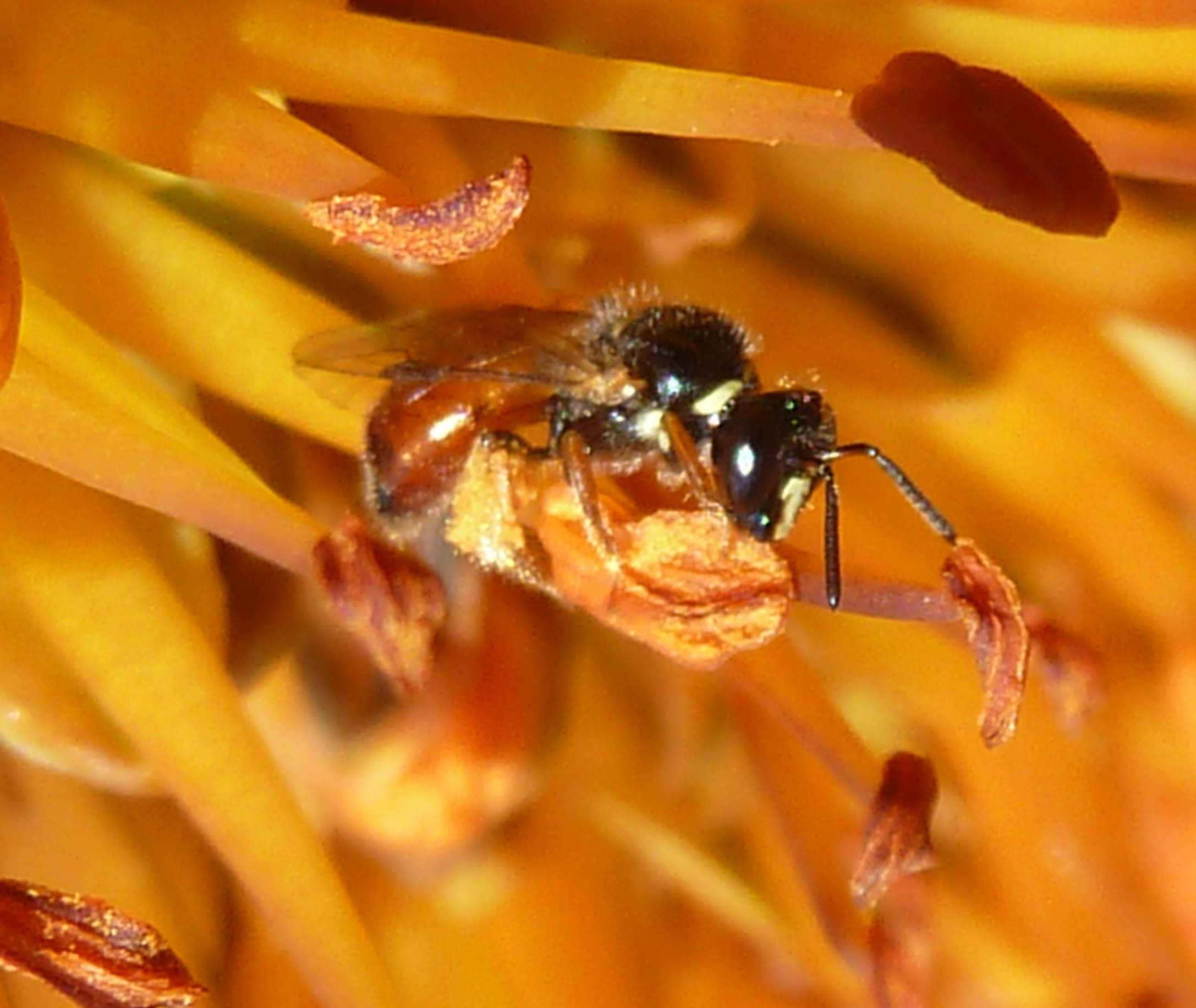
- Allodapula sp. in South Africa

Scientific classification
- Kingdom: Animalia
- Phylum: Arthropoda
- Class: Insecta
- Order: Hymenoptera
- Family: Apidae
- Subfamily: Xylocopinae
- Tribe: Allodapini; Cockerell, 1902

Genera
- Allodape; Allodapula; Braunsapis; Brevineura; Compsomelissa; Effractapis; Eucondylops; Exoneura; Exoneurella; Exoneuridia; Halterapis; Hasinamelissa; Inquilina; Macrogalea; Nasutapis

= Allodapini =

Tribe of bees

The Allodapini is a tribe of bees in the subfamily Xylocopinae, family Apidae. They occur throughout sub-Saharan Africa, South East Asia, and Australasia. There is also a rare genus, Exoneuridia, that occurs in isolated regions of Turkey, Iraq, Lebanon and Iran.

Many of the species in the tribe form small social colonies where a group of females cooperatively care for the developing larvae. The larvae are fed on pollen which, like most other bees, is carried on specialised hairs of the hind pair of legs, but the pollen is fed to the larvae in a progressive fashion and usually placed directly onto their bodies where they then consume it.

The larvae of allodapine bees are remarkable in their complex morphology, and in most species they possess appendages, tubercles and long setae. The strange morphology of allodapine larvae is probably a result of living in open tunnels where they are in constant contact with other larvae and with adults. The appendages, tubercles and setae serve to hold and manipulate food, and may also help larvae move around the nest. These abilities are important because larvae compete with each other to gain food, a situation which is different from all other bees, where individual larvae are isolated in cells and do not have to compete with each other.

There are over 300 described species of allodapine bees, but many more species are undescribed. They are unique among bees in progressively rearing their larvae in undivided tunnels, so that individual larvae are not physically isolated from each other and are in constant contact with adult females, who provide them with food, groom them, and remove their faeces.

Allodapine bees vary greatly in their forms of sociality, from subsocial to highly eusocial. Not considering kleptoparasitic species, there are no known species that are purely solitary. They have been used widely to study social evolution, sex allocation, social parasitism, and historical biogeography.

== Social evolution ==
Many allodapine species exhibit very simple forms of social organization, without clear queen or worker castes. For this reason it was long thought that they had only recently evolved forms of social living. However, molecular phylogenetic studies show that social living is ancestral for the tribe as a whole and has been in place for about 50 million years. An ancient origin of sociality in this group helps explain very sophisticated forms of social communication in some species, such as pheromonal regulation of reproduction and complex forms of kin recognition. The origin of queen and workers castes in allodapine bees is relatively recent, much less than 40 million years ago, compared with the honeybees, bumble bees and stingless bees, where true queen and worker castes evolved about 100 million years ago.

== Sex allocation ==
Most allodapine bee species have strongly female-biased sex ratios, and in many species less than 15% of brood are male. This is very different from the vast majority of animal species where sex ratios are very close to 1:1 males:females. The preponderance of female-biased sex ratios in allodapine bees is thought to be due to the benefits of sisters cooperating with each other and involves a theory known as local resource enhancement. For example, in Exoneura robusta, females provide the useful work in the colony and group living increases colony success, so the sex ratio is almost always female biased in this species.

== Social parasitism ==
Socially parasitic allodapine bees are species that have evolved to exploit the social systems of their hosts (which are other allodapine bees) so that the parasites enter the host colonies and lay their eggs there, and both the parasite adults as well as their larvae are fed by the host species. Molecular research has revealed nine origins of social parasitism in allodapine bees, more than all other bees and wasp groups combined. These repeated origins of social parasitism are probably due to the allodapine trait of rearing brood in communal tunnels, a trait that might allow other species to surreptitiously lay additional eggs without them being detected.

== Historical biogeography ==
Several studies have shown that allodapine bees first evolved in Africa and then spread to Madagascar, Asia and Australia. The earliest dispersal from Africa to Australia occurred about 30 million years ago and did not appear to involve a route via Asia, leading to a biogeographical puzzle because of the expanse of the Indian Ocean separating Australia from Africa. The most likely routes involved were now-submerged island stepping stones across the Indian Ocean, or dispersal from Africa to Antarctica and then overland dispersal from Antarctica to Australia when the two continents were still connected (ref). Both of these scenarios are problematic, but have been suggested for other animal and plant species.

== Conservation issues and biodiversity ==
Recent studies are marked by the number of species they have involved that have not been formally described (refs). This suggests that there is a large amount of allodapine diversity that is not covered by formal scientific taxonomy. Conservation concerns centre on two regions: (i) large-scale habitat loss in Madagascar poses a major threat to that island's unique bee fauna, including allodapine bees, many of which are still to be scientifically described; and (ii) the Australian region is likely to contain many undescribed socially parasitic species which are threatened because of their very small populations sizes. Conservation threats to allodapine bees in Asia have not been studied.

== Gallery ==
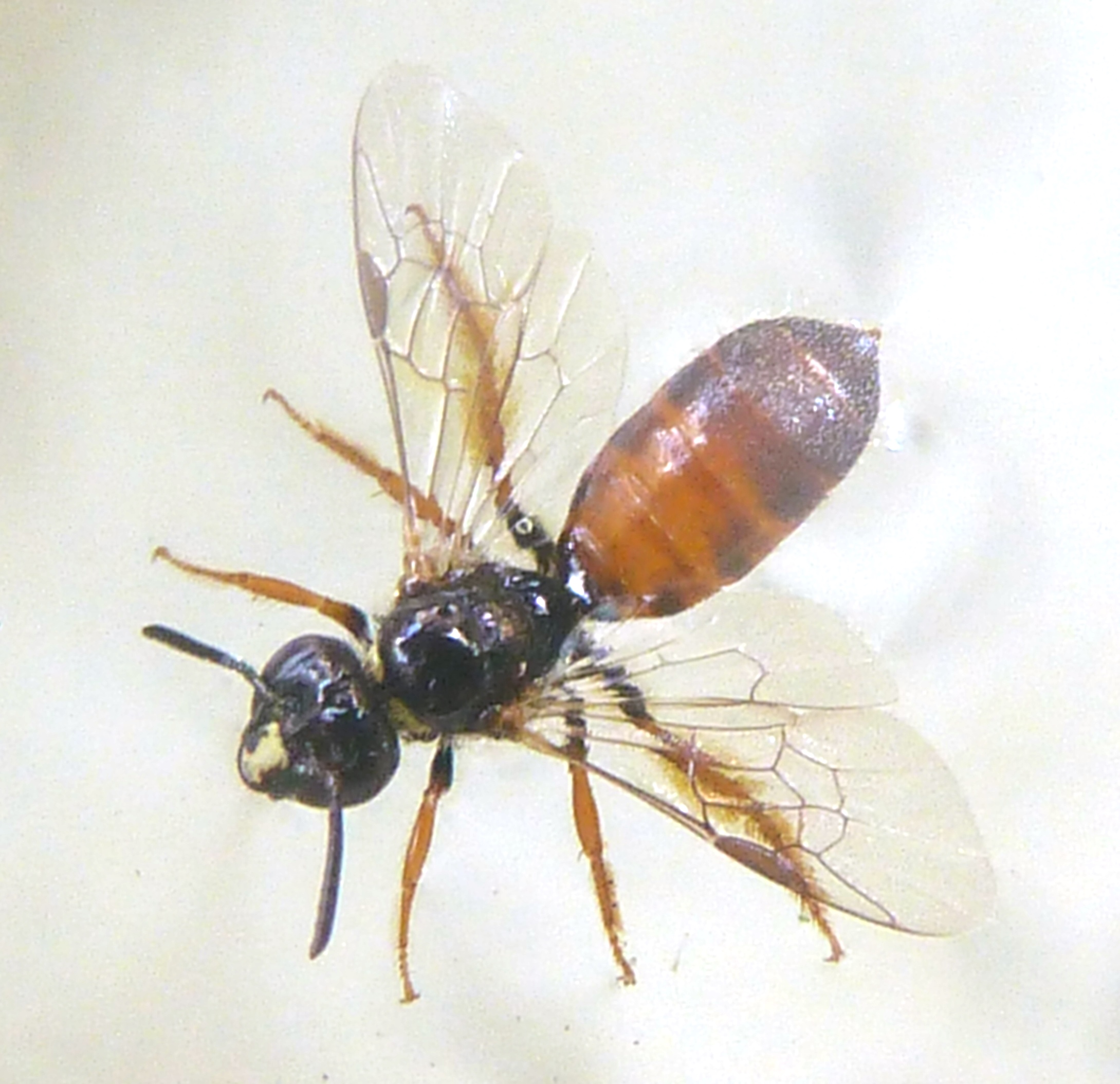
Allodapula sp.

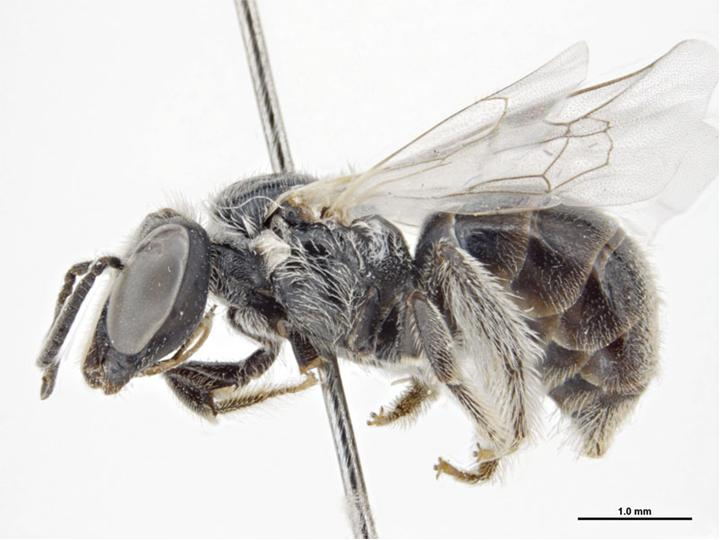
Braunsapis plumosa

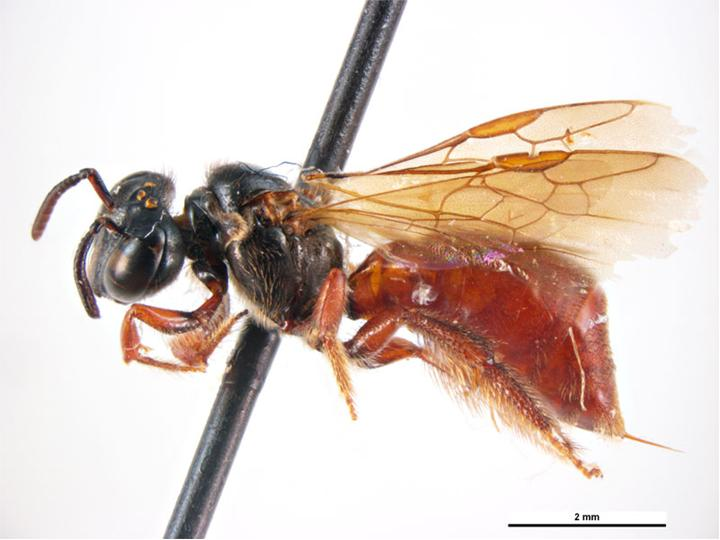
Exoneura bicincta

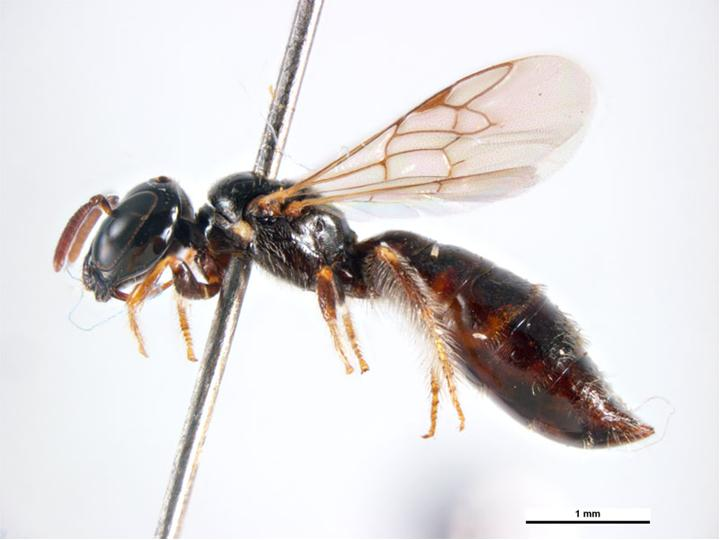
Exoneurella setosa, female

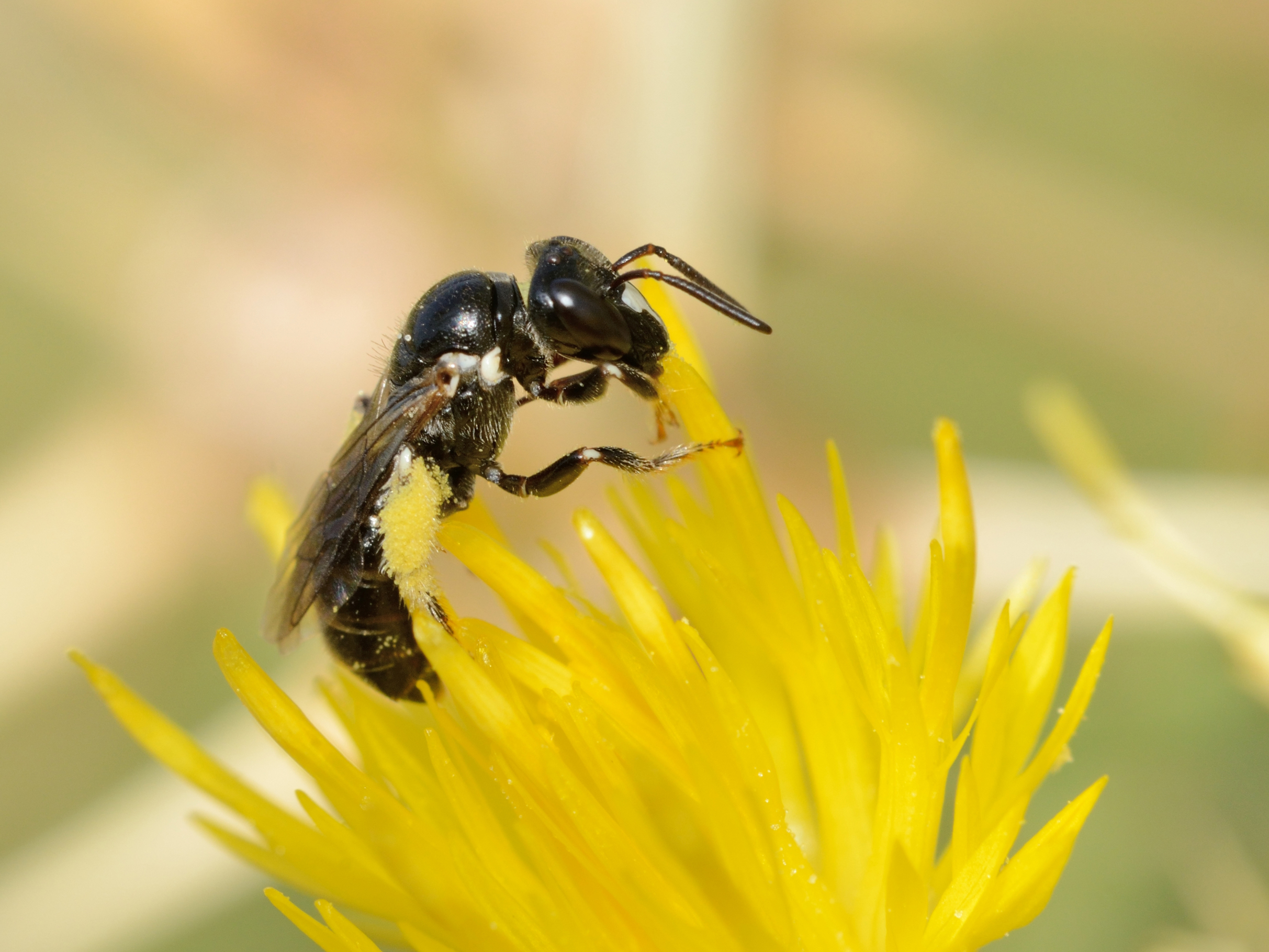
Exoneuridia libanensis

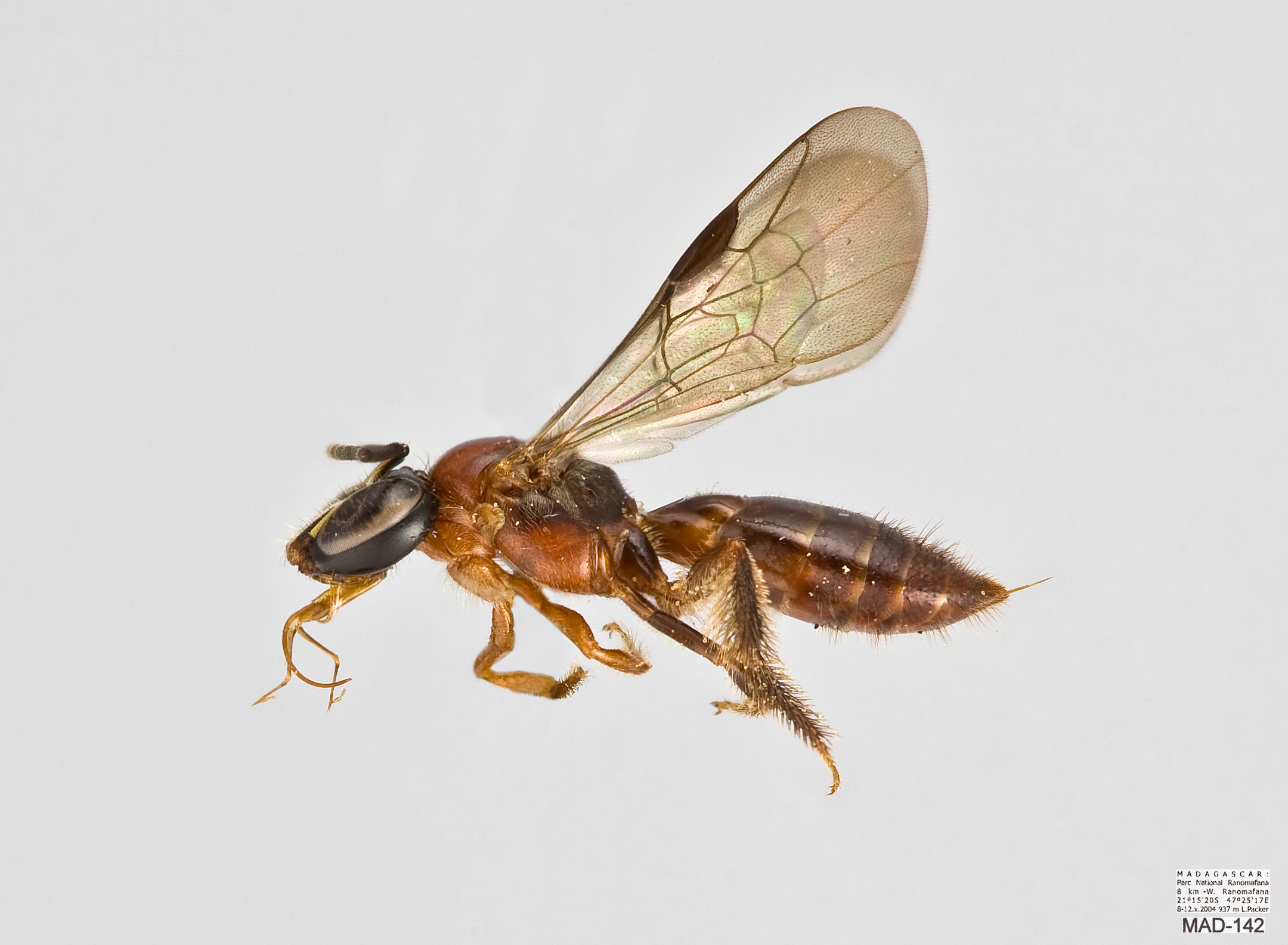
Halterapis rufa, female

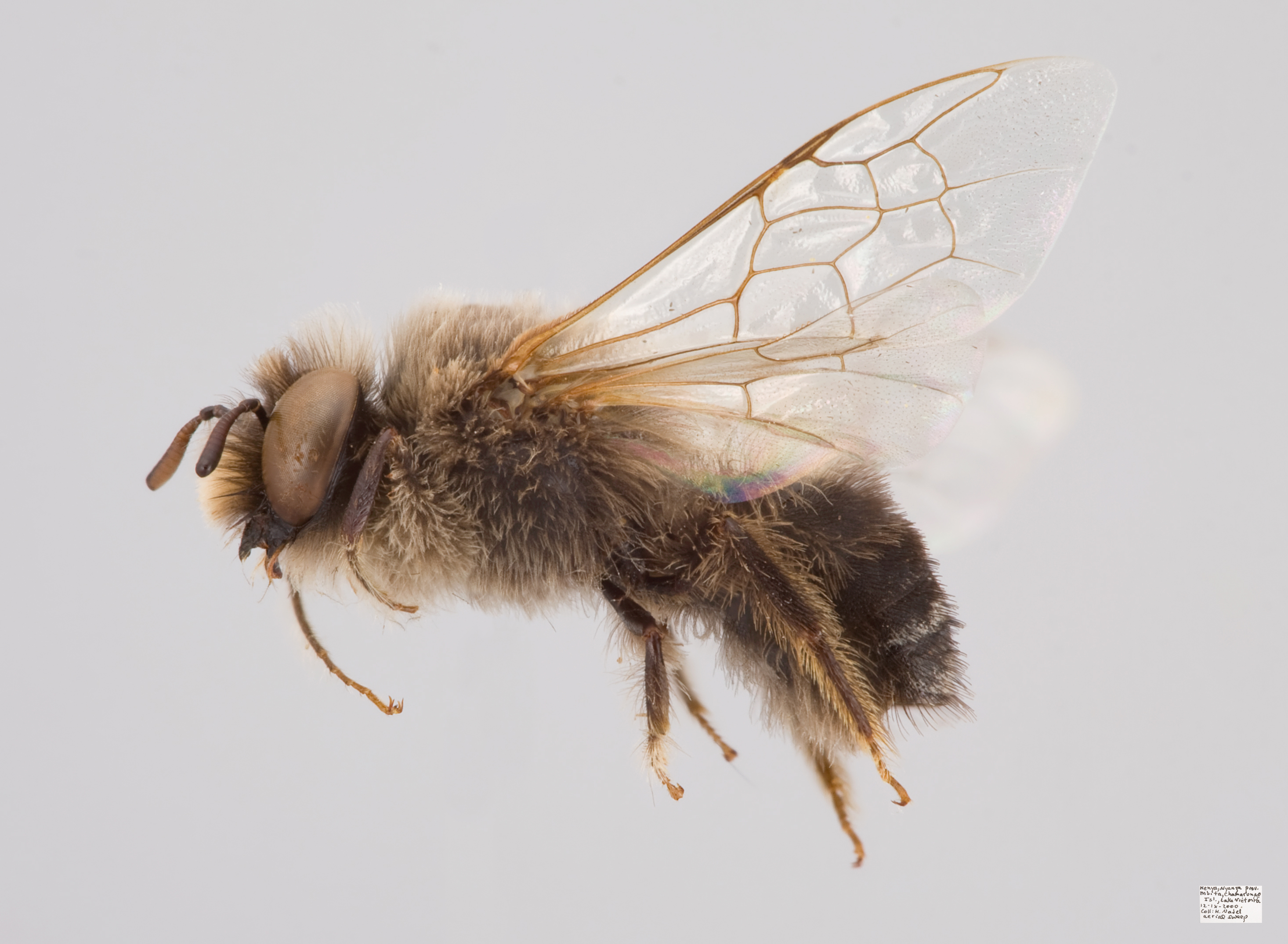
Macrogalea sp., male
