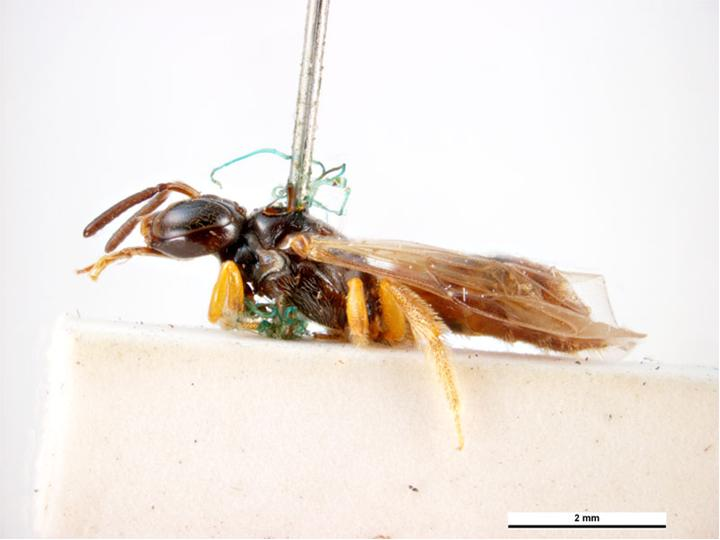
- Exoneura richardsoni

Scientific classification
- Kingdom: Animalia
- Phylum: Arthropoda
- Clade: Pancrustacea
- Class: Insecta
- Order: Hymenoptera
- Family: Apidae
- Tribe: Allodapini
- Genus: Exoneura; Smith, 1854

= Exoneura =

Genus of bees

Exoneura is a genus of some 68 species of social bees, also known as reed bees, belonging to the taxonomic family Apidae and tribe Allodapini. The genus is native to Australia.

== Taxonomy ==
There are three subgenera:

- Exoneura (Brevineura) Michener, 1965
- Exoneura (Exoneura) Smith, 1854
- Exoneura (Inquilina) Michener, 1961

Members of subgenus Inquilina are kleptoparasitic inquilines in the nests of the other two subgenera, a relationship that has existed for about 15 million years.

== Description ==
The bees have glossy black heads and thoraxes with black or red-orange abdomens. They are generally about 8 mm in length.

== Behaviour ==
These bees dig and occupy small nesting burrows within the pithy stems of plants, in which two or more adults may be found. They provision them with pollen and nectar on which they lay their eggs. The nest may contain many young at different stages of development.

The genus exhibits notable behavioural plasticity. Environmental factors that impact behaviour include nesting substrate, predation, parasitisation and resource availability. Substrate preferences have been shown to create localised nest aggregations. These affect behaviour such as task specialisation, which may be expressed altruistically as guarding behaviour.

== Species ==
See: List of Exoneura species
