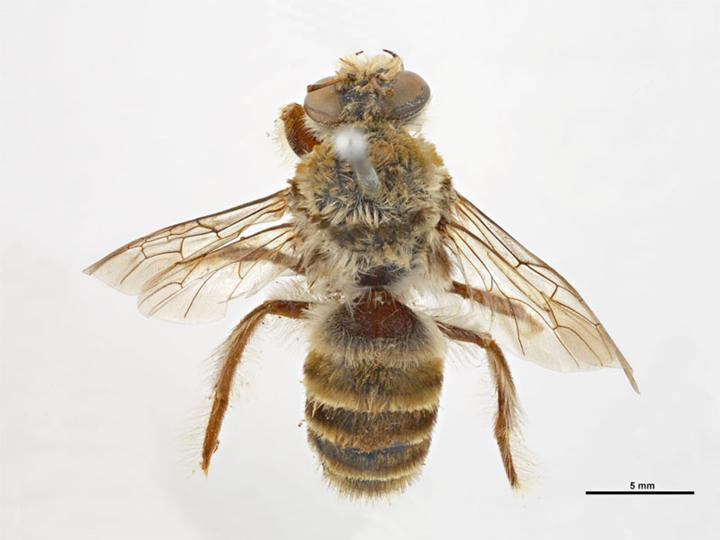

Scientific classification
- Kingdom: Animalia
- Phylum: Arthropoda
- Clade: Pancrustacea
- Class: Insecta
- Order: Hymenoptera
- Family: Stenotritidae
- Genus: Ctenocolletes
- Species: C. nicholsoni

Binomial name
- Ctenocolletes nicholsoni (Cockerell, 1929)

Synonyms
- Stenotritus (Ctenocolletes) nicholsoni Cockerell, 1929; Ctenocolletes notabilis Michener, 1965

= Ctenocolletes nicholsoni =

Species of bee

Ctenocolletes nicholsoni is a species of bee in the family Stenotritidae. It is endemic to Australia. It was described in 1929 by American entomologist Theodore Cockerell.

== Description ==
The body length of males is 17–19 mm; that of females 18–20 mm.

== Distribution and habitat ==
The species occurs in southern Western Australia. The holotype was collected at Geraldton. Flowering plants visited by the bees include Acacia, Wehlia, Calytrix, Scholtzia, Ptilotus and Baeckea species.

== Behaviour ==
The adults are solitary, flying mellivores that nest in burrows dug in soil; the larvae are sedentary.
