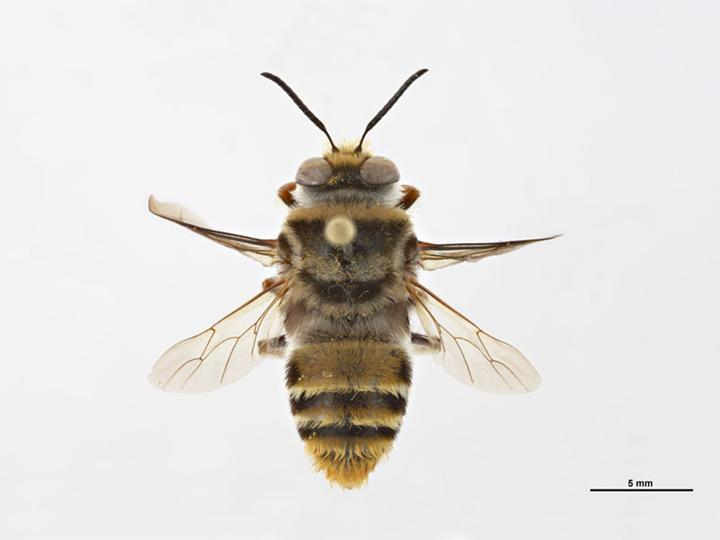

Scientific classification
- Kingdom: Animalia
- Phylum: Arthropoda
- Clade: Pancrustacea
- Class: Insecta
- Order: Hymenoptera
- Family: Stenotritidae
- Genus: Ctenocolletes
- Species: C. rufescens

Binomial name
- Ctenocolletes rufescens Houston, 1983

= Ctenocolletes rufescens =

Species of bee

Ctenocolletes rufescens is a species of bee in the family Stenotritidae. It is endemic to Australia. It was described in 1983 by Australian entomologist Terry Houston.

== Etymology ==
The specific epithet rufescens (Latin: “becoming red”) refers to the bees’ rust-coloured pubescence.

== Description ==
The body length of males is 16 mm; that of females is 18–19 mm.

== Distribution and habitat ==
The species occurs in southern Western Australia. The holotype was collected on Balline Station. Flowering plants visited by the bees include Melaleuca, Scholtzia, Hakea, Wehlia, Eucalyptus and Grevillea species.

== Behaviour ==
The adults are flying mellivores.
