= Leioproctus simillimus =

Scientific classification
- Kingdom: Animalia
- Phylum: Arthropoda
- Clade: Pancrustacea
- Class: Insecta
- Order: Hymenoptera
- Family: Colletidae
- Genus: Leioproctus
- Species: L. simillimus

Binomial name
- Leioproctus simillimus (Smith, 1879)

Synonyms
- Euryglossa simillima Smith, 1879; Euryglossa ichneumonoides Cockerell, 1906

Species of bee

Leioproctus simillimus, or Leioproctus (Euryglossidia) simillimus, is a species of bee in the family Colletidae and subfamily Colletinae. It is endemic to Australia. It was described by English entomologist Frederick Smith in 1879.

== Distribution and habitat ==
The species occurs in south-west Western Australia. Type localities include Swan River.

== Behaviour ==
The adults are flying mellivores. Flowering plants visited by the bees include Scholtzia drummondii, Grevillea commutata, Hakea candolleana and Thryptomene species.

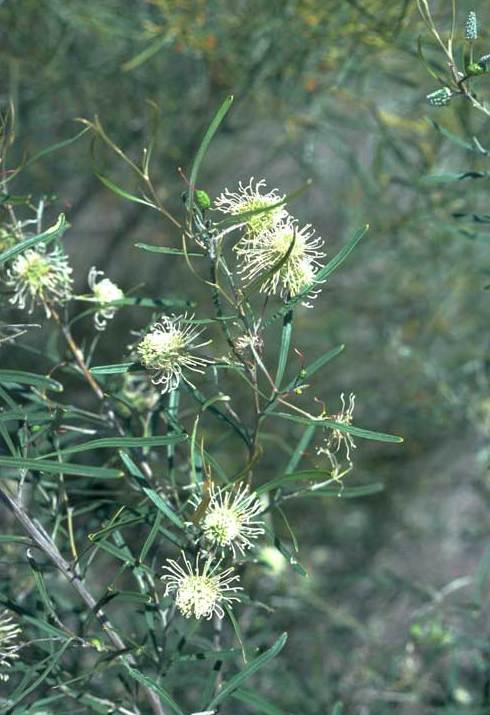
Grevillea commutata, a forage plant of the bees
