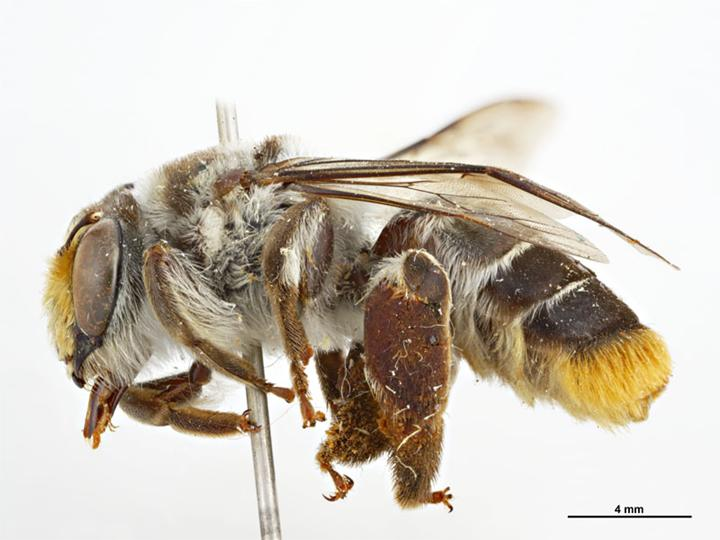

Scientific classification
- Kingdom: Animalia
- Phylum: Arthropoda
- Clade: Pancrustacea
- Class: Insecta
- Order: Hymenoptera
- Family: Stenotritidae
- Genus: Ctenocolletes
- Species: C. tricolor

Binomial name
- Ctenocolletes tricolor Houston, 1983

= Ctenocolletes tricolor =

Species of bee

Ctenocolletes tricolor is a species of bee in the family Stenotritidae. It is endemic to Australia. It was described in 1983 by Australian entomologist Terry Houston.

== Etymology ==
The specific epithet tricolor (Latin: “three-coloured”) refers to the colours – orange, white and dark brown – of the pubescence.

== Description ==
The body length of males is 18 mm; that of females is 19 mm.

== Distribution and habitat ==
The species occurs in southern Western Australia. The holotype was collected 8 km south of Yellowdine. Flowering plants visited by the bees include Melaleuca, Wehlia and Grevillea species.

== Behaviour ==
The adults are flying mellivores.
