= Leioproctus cygnellus =

Scientific classification
- Kingdom: Animalia
- Phylum: Arthropoda
- Clade: Pancrustacea
- Class: Insecta
- Order: Hymenoptera
- Family: Colletidae
- Genus: Leioproctus
- Species: L. cygnellus

Binomial name
- Leioproctus cygnellus (Cockerell, 1905)

Synonyms
- Euryglossa cygnella Cockerell, 1905; Euryglossidia cyanescens Cockerell, 1929

Species of bee

Leioproctus cygnellus, or Leioproctus (Euryglossidia) cygnellus, is a species of bee in the family Colletidae and subfamily Colletinae. It is endemic to Australia. It was described by British-American entomologist Theodore Dru Alison Cockerell in 1905.

== Distribution and habitat ==
The species occurs in Western Australia. Type localities include Swan River and Kojarena.

== Behaviour ==
The adults are flying mellivores. Flowering plants visited by the bees include Acacia aciphylla, Seringia integrifolia, Scholtzia parviflora, Malleostemon tuberculatus and Muehlenbeckia adpressa, as well as Leptospermum and Hakea species.

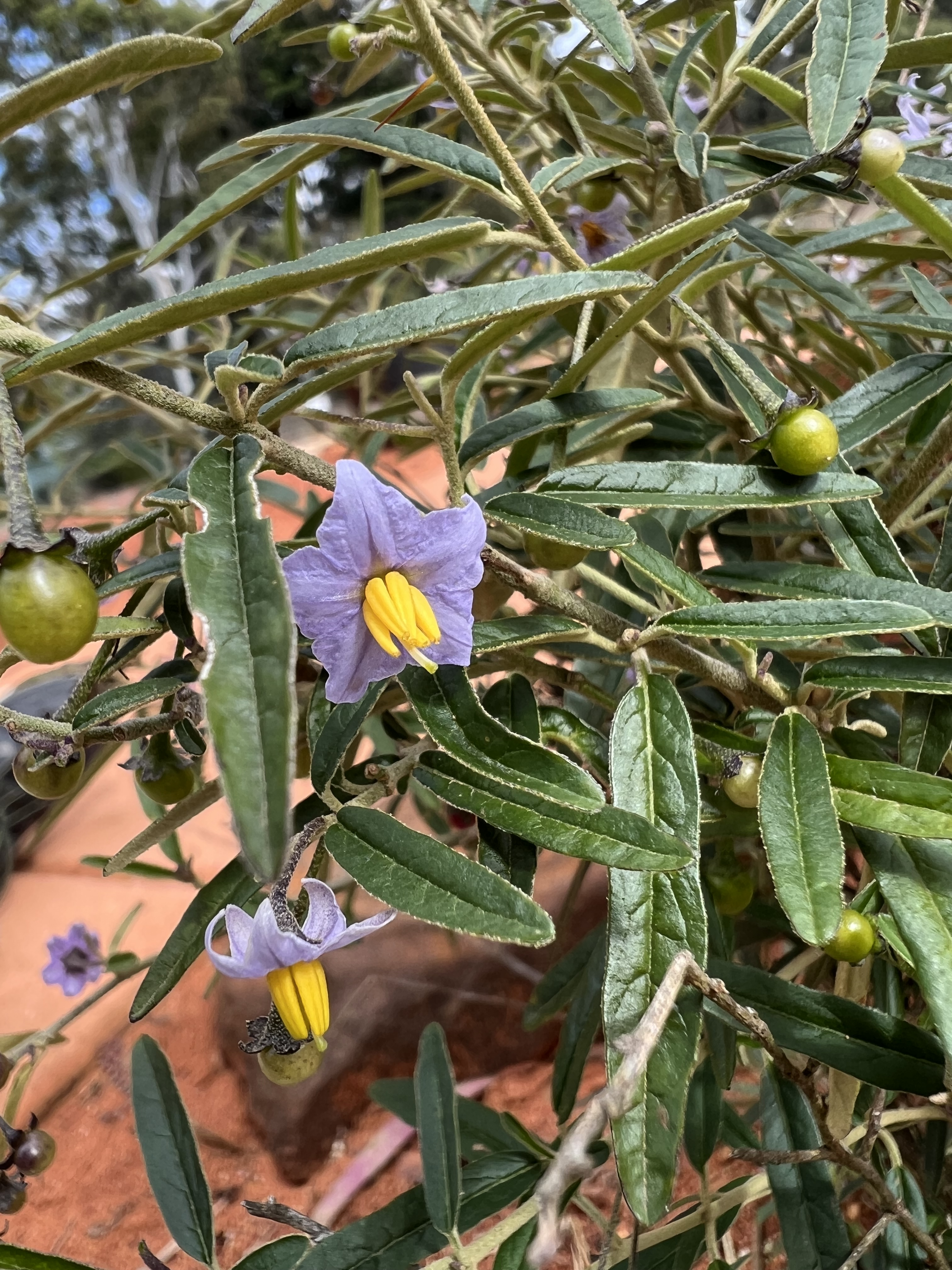
Seringia integrifolia (common firebush), a forage plant of the bees
