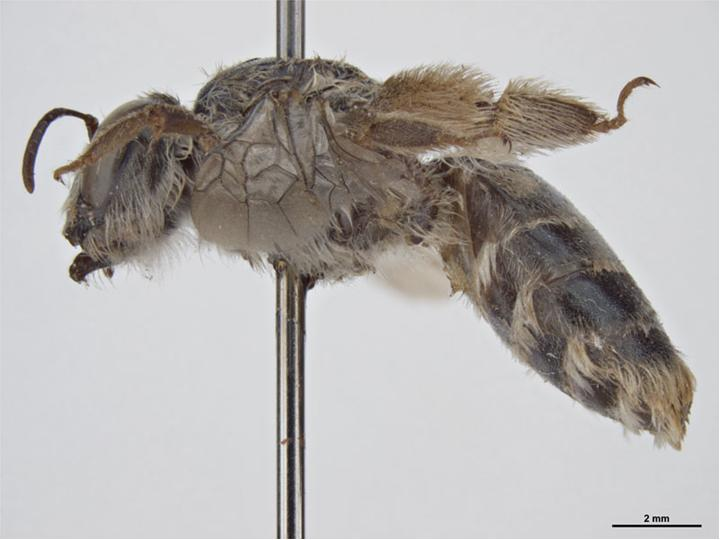

Scientific classification
- Kingdom: Animalia
- Phylum: Arthropoda
- Clade: Pancrustacea
- Class: Insecta
- Order: Hymenoptera
- Family: Stenotritidae
- Genus: Stenotritus
- Species: S. murrayensis

Binomial name
- Stenotritus murrayensis Rayment, 1935

Synonyms
- Ctenocolletes murrayensis Rayment, 1935

= Stenotritus murrayensis =

Species of bee

Stenotritus murrayensis is a species of bee in the family Stenotritidae. It is endemic to Australia. It was described in 1935 by Australian entomologist Tarlton Rayment.

== Description ==
The body length of the female is 17 mm.

== Distribution and habitat ==
The species occurs in New South Wales. The holotype was collected at Wentworth.

== Behaviour ==
The adults are flying mellivores.
