= Stenotritus nitidus =

Scientific classification
- Kingdom: Animalia
- Phylum: Arthropoda
- Clade: Pancrustacea
- Class: Insecta
- Order: Hymenoptera
- Family: Stenotritidae
- Genus: Stenotritus
- Species: S. nitidus

Binomial name
- Stenotritus nitidus (Smith, 1879)

Synonyms
- Paracolletes nitidus Smith, 1879

Species of bee

Stenotritus nitidus is a species of bee in the family Stenotritidae. It is endemic to Australia. It was described in 1879 by English entomologist Frederick Smith.

== Distribution and habitat ==
The species occurs in Western Australia. The only known locality is the north-west coastal region where the female holotype was collected.

== Behaviour ==
The adults are flying mellivores.
