= Stenotritus victoriae =

Scientific classification
- Kingdom: Animalia
- Phylum: Arthropoda
- Clade: Pancrustacea
- Class: Insecta
- Order: Hymenoptera
- Family: Stenotritidae
- Genus: Stenotritus
- Species: S. victoriae

Binomial name
- Stenotritus victoriae (Cockerell, 1906)

Synonyms
- Gastropsis victoriae Cockerell, 1906

Species of bee

Stenotritus victoriae is a species of bee in the family Stenotritidae. It is endemic to Australia. It was described in 1906 by American entomologist Theodore Cockerell.

== Distribution and habitat ==
The species occurs in South Australia, Victoria and Western Australia.

== Behaviour ==
The adults are flying mellivores.
