= Stenotritus elegantior =

Scientific classification
- Kingdom: Animalia
- Phylum: Arthropoda
- Clade: Pancrustacea
- Class: Insecta
- Order: Hymenoptera
- Family: Stenotritidae
- Genus: Stenotritus
- Species: S. elegantior

Binomial name
- Stenotritus elegantior Cockerell, 1921

Species of bee

Stenotritus elegantior is a species of bee in the family Stenotritidae. It is endemic to Australia. It was described in 1921 by American entomologist Theodore Cockerell.

== Description ==
The body length of the female holotype is 16 mm.

== Distribution and habitat ==
The species occurs in Queensland. It is known only from the female holotype, with the type locality thought to be in the Mackay Region.

== Behaviour ==
The adults are flying mellivores.
