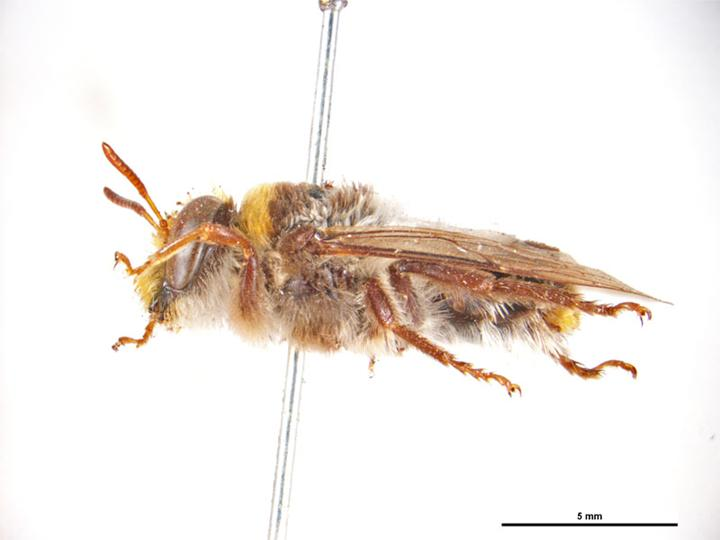
- Male

Scientific classification
- Kingdom: Animalia
- Phylum: Arthropoda
- Clade: Pancrustacea
- Class: Insecta
- Order: Hymenoptera
- Family: Stenotritidae
- Genus: Stenotritus
- Species: S. rufocollaris

Binomial name
- Stenotritus rufocollaris Cockerell, 1921

Synonyms
- Gastropsis victoriae rufocollaris Cockerell, 1921

= Stenotritus rufocollaris =

Species of bee

Stenotritus rufocollaris is a species of bee in the family Stenotritidae. It is endemic to Australia. It was described in 1921 by American entomologist Theodore Cockerell.

== Description ==
The body length of a male syntype is 14 mm.

== Distribution and habitat ==
The species occurs in Victoria. The type locality is in the Mallee region in the north-west of the state.

== Behaviour ==
The adults are flying mellivores.

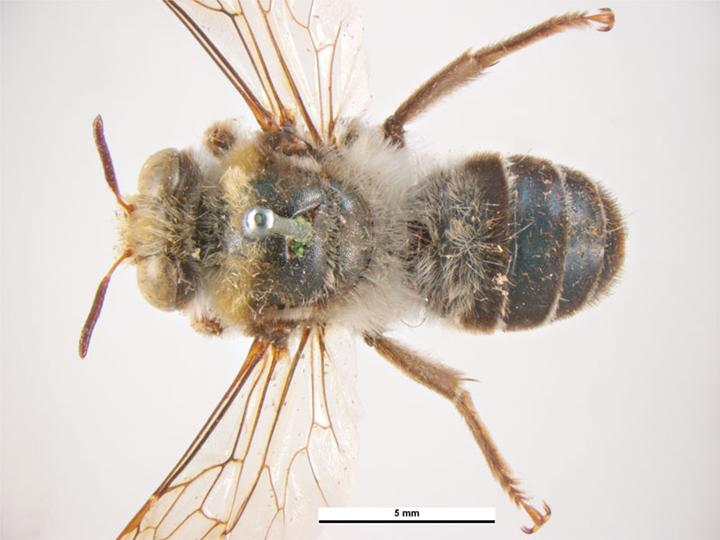
Female
