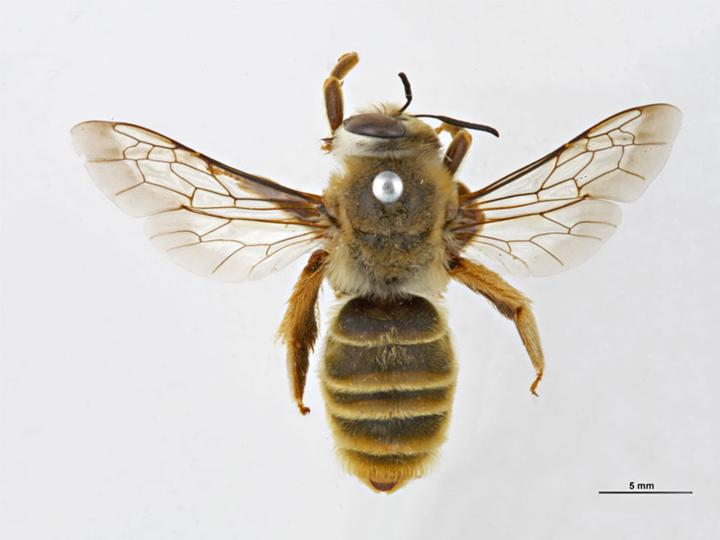

Scientific classification
- Kingdom: Animalia
- Phylum: Arthropoda
- Clade: Pancrustacea
- Class: Insecta
- Order: Hymenoptera
- Family: Stenotritidae
- Genus: Ctenocolletes
- Species: C. centralis

Binomial name
- Ctenocolletes centralis Houston, 1983

= Ctenocolletes centralis =

Species of bee

Ctenocolletes centralis is a species of bee in the family Stenotritidae. It is endemic to Australia. It was described in 1983 by Australian entomologist Terry Houston.

== Etymology ==
The specific epithet centralis alludes to the species’ distribution.

== Description ==
The body length of males is 16 mm; that of females 16–19 mm.

== Distribution and habitat ==
The species occurs in the central desert region of Western Australia. The holotype was collected three miles south of Neale Junction in the Great Victoria Desert. Flowering plants visited by the bees include Acacia, Baeckea, Dicrastylis and Thryptomene species.

== Behaviour ==
The adults are flying mellivores.
