= Leioproctus spinescens =

Scientific classification
- Kingdom: Animalia
- Phylum: Arthropoda
- Clade: Pancrustacea
- Class: Insecta
- Order: Hymenoptera
- Family: Colletidae
- Genus: Leioproctus
- Species: L. spinescens

Binomial name
- Leioproctus spinescens Batley, 2025

Species of bee

Leioproctus spinescens, or Leioproctus (Euryglossidia) spinescens, is a species of bee in the family Colletidae and subfamily Colletinae. It is endemic to Australia. It was described by entomologist Michael Batley in 2025.

== Etymology ==
The specific epithet spinescens refers to the spiny hind legs.

== Description ==
The male body length is 6.3 mm. Integumental colouration is mainly black, with bronze apical tergal margins. The hair is white.

== Distribution and habitat ==
The species occurs in south-west Western Australia. The type locality is 14 km west-south-west of Eneabba.

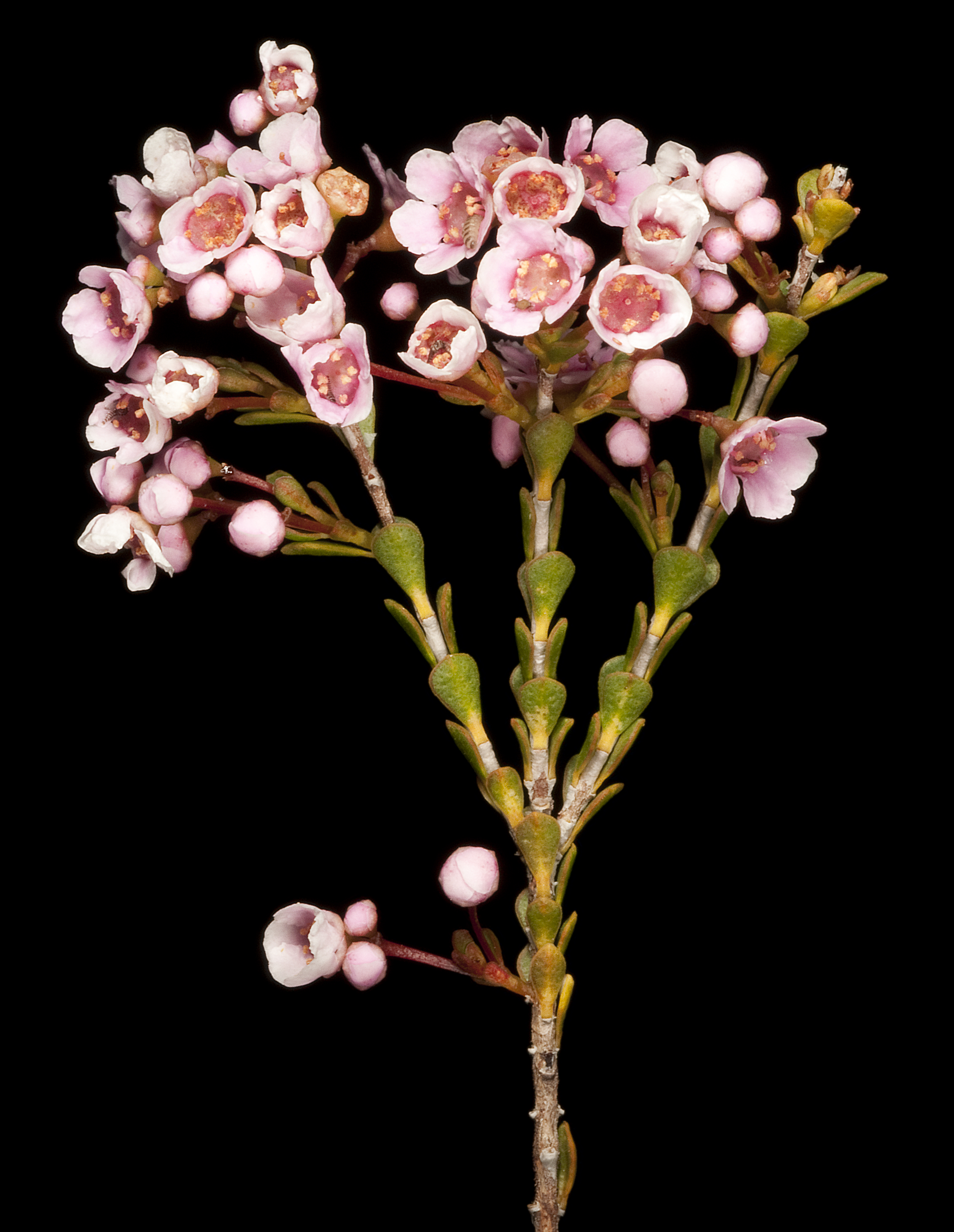
Flowers of Scholtzia laxiflora, a forage plant of the bees

== Behaviour ==
The adults are flying mellivores. Flowering plants visited by the bees include Scholtzia laxiflora.
