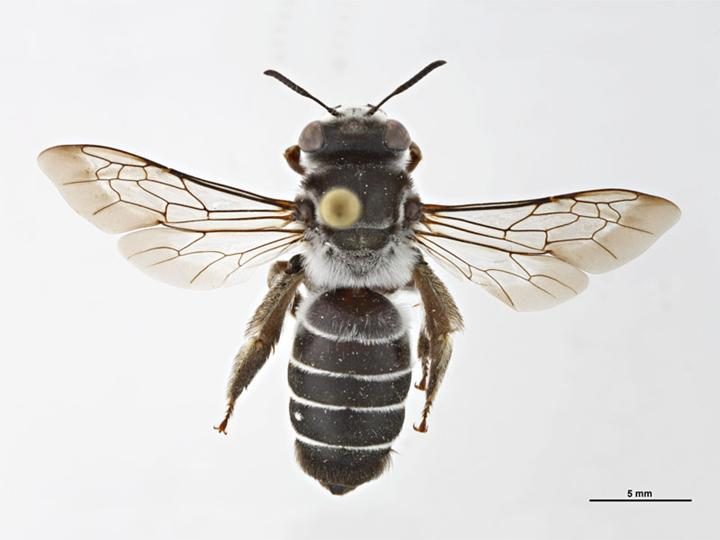
- Female

Scientific classification
- Kingdom: Animalia
- Phylum: Arthropoda
- Clade: Pancrustacea
- Class: Insecta
- Order: Hymenoptera
- Family: Stenotritidae
- Genus: Ctenocolletes
- Species: C. nigricans

Binomial name
- Ctenocolletes nigricans Houston, 1985

= Ctenocolletes nigricans =

Species of bee

Ctenocolletes nigricans is a species of bee in the family Stenotritidae. It is endemic to Australia. It was described in 1985 by Australian entomologist Terry Houston.

== Etymology ==
The specific epithet nigricans (Latin: “becoming black”) refers to the dominance of black in the colour pattern.

== Description ==
The body length of males is 14–16 mm; that of females is 16–18 mm.

== Distribution and habitat ==
The species occurs in the Geraldton Sandplains region of Western Australia. The holotype was collected 13 km south of Wannoo. Flowering plants visited by the bees include Thryptomene and Melaleuca species.

== Behaviour ==
The adults are solitary, flying mellivores, with sedentary larvae, that nest in burrows dug in soil.

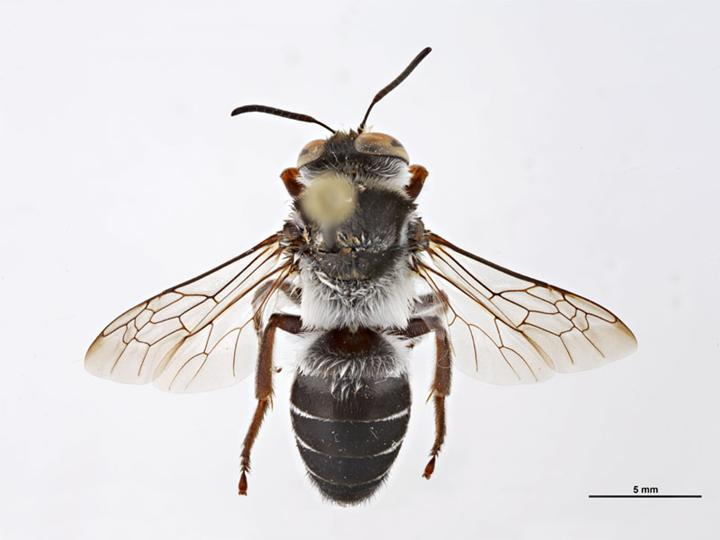
Male
