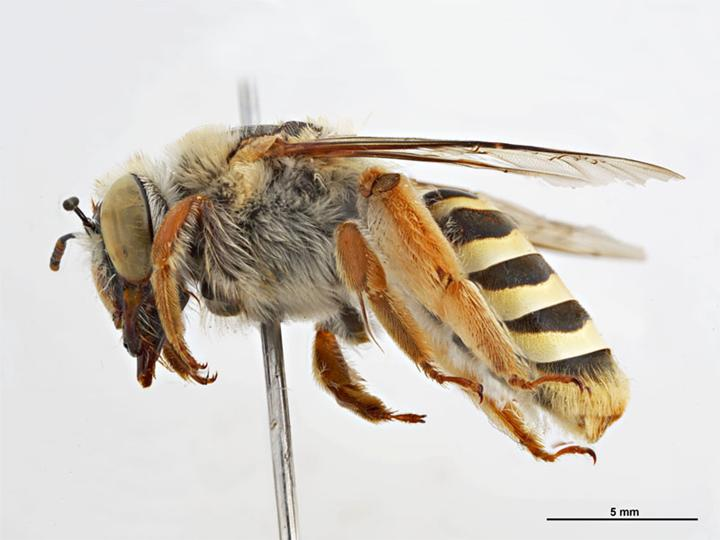

Scientific classification
- Kingdom: Animalia
- Phylum: Arthropoda
- Clade: Pancrustacea
- Class: Insecta
- Order: Hymenoptera
- Family: Stenotritidae
- Genus: Ctenocolletes
- Species: C. tigris

Binomial name
- Ctenocolletes tigris Houston, 1983

= Ctenocolletes tigris =

Species of bee

Ctenocolletes tigris is a species of bee in the family Stenotritidae. It is endemic to Australia. It was described in 1983 by Australian entomologist Terry Houston.

== Etymology ==
The specific epithet tigris (Latin: “tiger”) alludes to the colour pattern of black and yellow integumental bands across the metasoma.

== Description ==
The body length of males is 16.5 mm; that of females is 16–19 mm.

== Distribution and habitat ==
The species occurs in the Great Victoria Desert of Western Australia. The holotype was collected 36 km north-north-east of Neale Junction. Flowering plants visited by the bees include Dicrastylis, Baeckea, Wehlia, Acacia, Ptilotus, Grevillea, Newcastelia, Teucrium, Thryptomene and Solanum species.

== Behaviour ==
The adults are solitary, flying mellivores, with sedentary larvae, that nest in burrows dug in soil.
