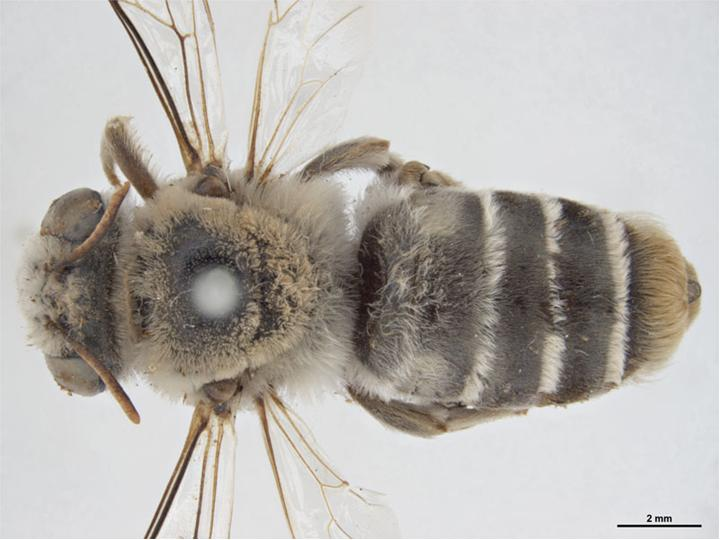

Scientific classification
- Kingdom: Animalia
- Phylum: Arthropoda
- Clade: Pancrustacea
- Class: Insecta
- Order: Hymenoptera
- Family: Stenotritidae
- Genus: Stenotritus
- Species: S. ferricornis

Binomial name
- Stenotritus ferricornis (Cockerell, 1916)

Synonyms
- Paracolletes ferricornis Cockerell, 1916

= Stenotritus ferricornis =

Species of bee

Stenotritus ferricornis is a species of bee in the family Stenotritidae. It is endemic to Australia. It was described in 1916 by American entomologist Theodore Cockerell.

== Distribution and habitat ==
The species occurs in the Northern Territory, where it is known only from the type locality of Hermannsburg.

== Behaviour ==
The adults are flying mellivores.
