= Stenotritus taylori =

Scientific classification
- Kingdom: Animalia
- Phylum: Arthropoda
- Clade: Pancrustacea
- Class: Insecta
- Order: Hymenoptera
- Family: Stenotritidae
- Genus: Stenotritus
- Species: S. taylori

Binomial name
- Stenotritus taylori Houston, 2025

Species of bee

Stenotritus taylori is a species of bee in the family Stenotritidae. It is endemic to Australia. It was described in 2025 by Australian entomologist Terry Houston.

== Distribution and habitat ==
The species occurs in Western Australia from Perth northwards to near Geraldton in the Swan Coastal Plain and Geraldton Sandplains bioregions. The holotype was collected at Ellendale, some 34 km east-south-east of Geraldton.

== Behaviour ==
The adults are flying mellivores. Flowering plants visited by the bees include Verticordia monadelpha callitriche.
