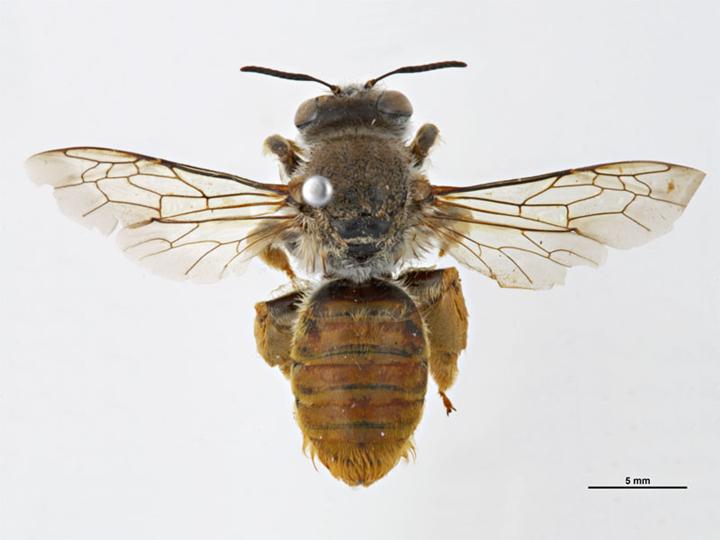

Scientific classification
- Kingdom: Animalia
- Phylum: Arthropoda
- Clade: Pancrustacea
- Class: Insecta
- Order: Hymenoptera
- Family: Stenotritidae
- Genus: Ctenocolletes
- Species: C. fulvescens

Binomial name
- Ctenocolletes fulvescens Houston, 1983

= Ctenocolletes fulvescens =

Species of bee

Ctenocolletes fulvescens is a species of bee in the family Stenotritidae. It is endemic to Australia. It was described in 1983 by Australian entomologist Terry Houston.

== Etymology ==
The specific epithet fulvescens (Latin: “becoming golden”) alludes to the bees’ metasomal pubescence.

== Description ==
The body length of females is 18 mm.

== Distribution and habitat ==
The species occurs in the central desert region of Western Australia, the range extending into the adjacent region of South Australia. The holotype was collected 20 miles north-east of Eucla. Flowering plants visited by the bees include Eucalyptus oleosa.

== Behaviour ==
The adults are flying mellivores.
