= Stenotritus splendidus =

Scientific classification
- Kingdom: Animalia
- Phylum: Arthropoda
- Clade: Pancrustacea
- Class: Insecta
- Order: Hymenoptera
- Family: Stenotritidae
- Genus: Stenotritus
- Species: S. splendidus

Binomial name
- Stenotritus splendidus Rayment, 1930

Synonyms
- Melitribus pubescens splendida Rayment, 1930

Species of bee

Stenotritus splendidus is a species of bee in the family Stenotritidae. It is endemic to Australia. It was described in 1930 by Australian entomologist Tarlton Rayment.

== Distribution and habitat ==
The species occurs in Western Australia. The holotype was collected at Geraldton.

== Behaviour ==
The adults are flying mellivores. Flowering plants visited by the bees include Eucalyptus and Verticordia species.
