= Stenotritus nigrescens =

Scientific classification
- Kingdom: Animalia
- Phylum: Arthropoda
- Clade: Pancrustacea
- Class: Insecta
- Order: Hymenoptera
- Family: Stenotritidae
- Genus: Stenotritus
- Species: S. nigrescens

Binomial name
- Stenotritus nigrescens Friese, 1924

Synonyms
- Gastropsis pubescens nigrescens Friese, 1924

Species of bee

Stenotritus nigrescens is a species of bee in the family Stenotritidae. It is endemic to Australia. It was described in 1924 by German entomologist Heinrich Friese.

== Distribution and habitat ==
The species occurs in the Northern Territory. It is only known from the type locality of “Central Australia”.

== Behaviour ==
The adults are flying mellivores.
