= Stenotritus elegans =

Scientific classification
- Kingdom: Animalia
- Phylum: Arthropoda
- Clade: Pancrustacea
- Class: Insecta
- Order: Hymenoptera
- Family: Stenotritidae
- Genus: Stenotritus
- Species: S. elegans

Binomial name
- Stenotritus elegans Smith, 1853

Species of bee

Stenotritus elegans is a species of bee in the family Stenotritidae. It is endemic to Australia. It was described in 1853 by English entomologist Frederick Smith.

== Distribution and habitat ==
Published localities for the species include Sydney in New South Wales and Tennant Creek in the Northern Territory.

== Behaviour ==
The adults are flying mellivores.
