= Homalocalyx coarctatus =

Scientific classification
- Kingdom: Plantae
- Clade: Tracheophytes
- Clade: Angiosperms
- Clade: Eudicots
- Clade: Rosids
- Order: Myrtales
- Family: Myrtaceae
- Genus: Homalocalyx
- Species: H. coarctatus

Binomial name
- Homalocalyx coarctatus (F.Muell.) Craven

Species of flowering plant

Homalocalyx coarctatus is a member of the family Myrtaceae endemic to Western Australia.

The spreading shrub typically grows to a height of 0.3 to 0.7 metres (1.0 to 2.3 ft). It blooms between September and November producing red-pink-purple flowers.

It is found on sand plains in the northern Wheatbelt and the Mid West regions of Western Australia where it grows in sandy soils.
