= Homalocalyx staminosus =

Scientific classification
- Kingdom: Plantae
- Clade: Tracheophytes
- Clade: Angiosperms
- Clade: Eudicots
- Clade: Rosids
- Order: Myrtales
- Family: Myrtaceae
- Genus: Homalocalyx
- Species: H. staminosus

Binomial name
- Homalocalyx staminosus (F.Muell.) Craven

Species of flowering plant

Homalocalyx staminosus is a member of the family Myrtaceae endemic to Western Australia.

== Description ==
The shrub typically grows to a height of 0.45 to 1.2 metres (1.5 to 3.9 ft). It blooms between July and September producing pink-purple-red flowers.

== Ecology ==
It is found on rocky sandstone ridges in a scattered area in the northern Mid West and Pilbara regions of Western Australia where it grows in shallow soils.
