= Scholtzia eatoniana =

Conservation status
- Priority One — Poorly Known Taxa (DEC)

Scientific classification
- Kingdom: Plantae
- Clade: Tracheophytes
- Clade: Angiosperms
- Clade: Eudicots
- Clade: Rosids
- Order: Myrtales
- Family: Myrtaceae
- Genus: Scholtzia
- Species: S. eatoniana

Binomial name
- Scholtzia eatoniana (Ewart & Jean White) C.A.Gardner

Species of shrub

Scholtzia eatoniana is a shrub species in the family Myrtaceae that is endemic to Western Australia.

The diffuse to prostrate shrub typically grows to a height of 0.15 metres (0.5 ft). It blooms between November and December producing pink-white flowers.

It is found in the Wheatbelt region of Western Australia between Tammin and Cunderdin.
