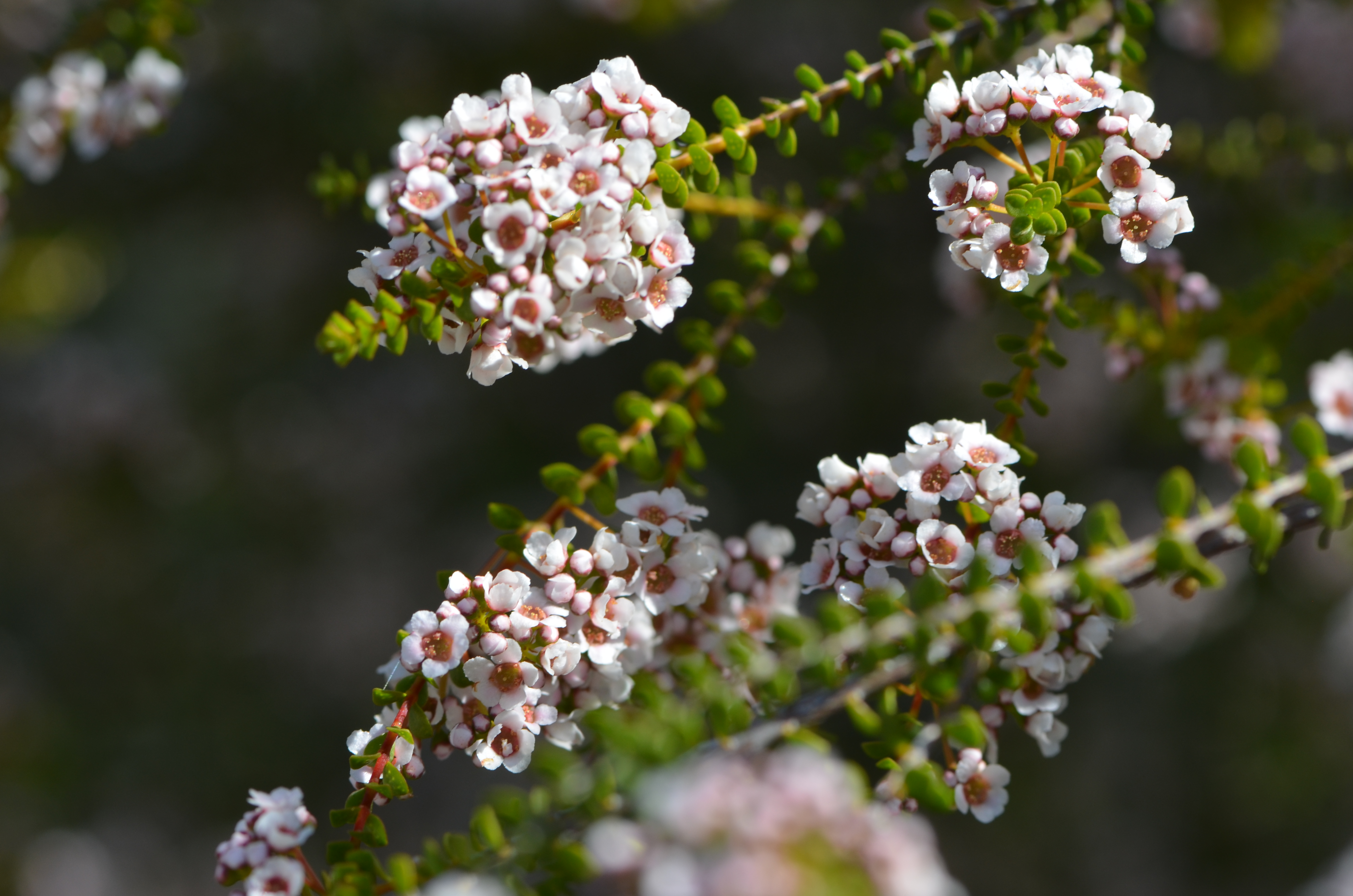

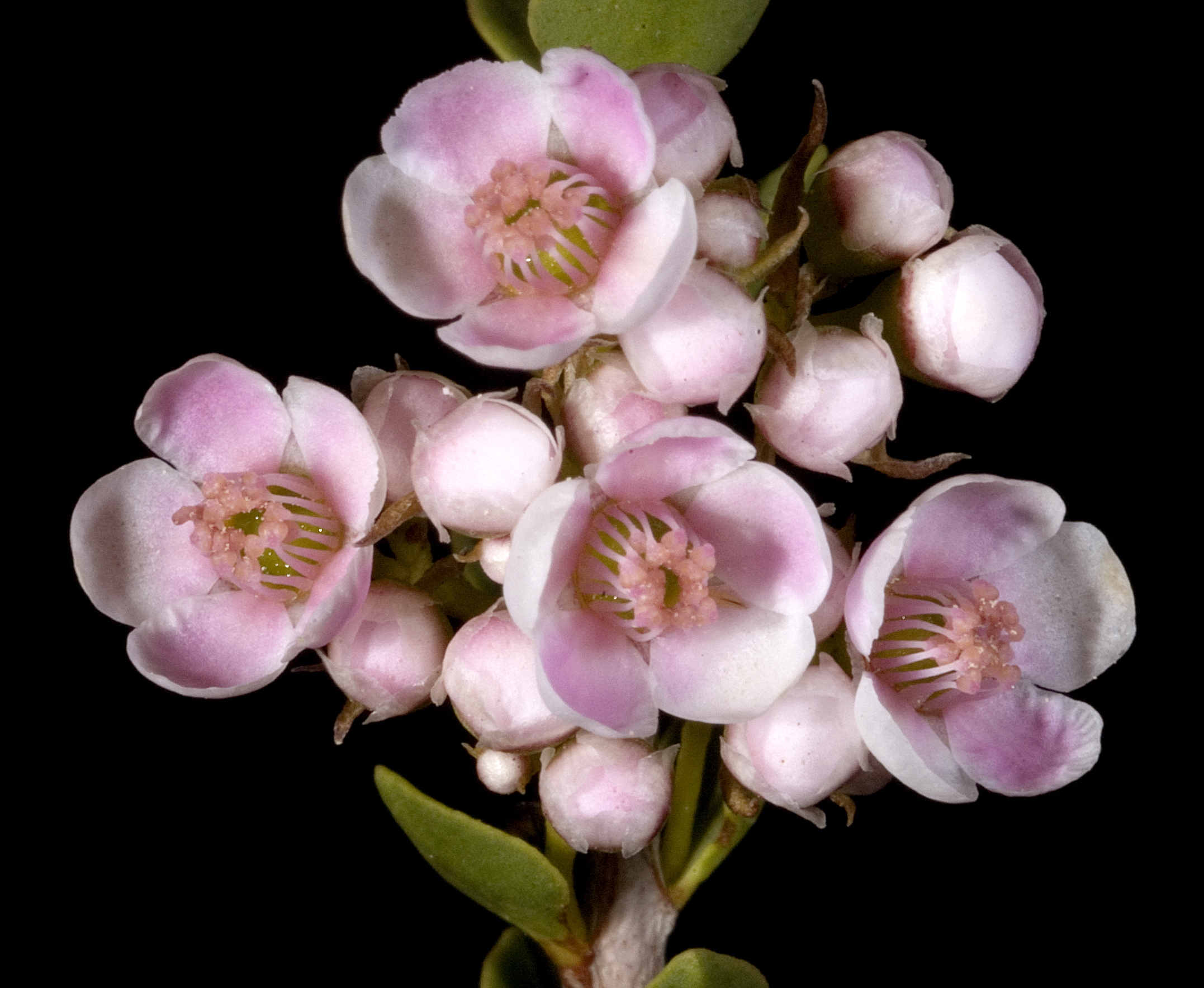

Scientific classification
- Kingdom: Plantae
- Clade: Tracheophytes
- Clade: Angiosperms
- Clade: Eudicots
- Clade: Rosids
- Order: Myrtales
- Family: Myrtaceae
- Genus: Scholtzia
- Species: S. involucrata

Binomial name
- Scholtzia involucrata (Endl.) Druce

= Scholtzia involucrata =

Spiked scholtzia

Species of shrub

Scholtzia involucrata, commonly known as spiked scholtzia, is a shrub species in the family Myrtaceae that is endemic to Western Australia.

The erect, spreading to decumbent shrub typically grows to a height of 0.2 to 1.5 metres (0.7 to 4.9 ft). The evergreen leaves are 4 to 9 millimetres (0.157 to 0.354 in) in length. It blooms between November and May producing pink-white flowers. Each flower has a diameter of 8 mm (0.315 in).

The species was first formally described by the botanist George Claridge Druce in 1917 as part of the work Nomenclatorial Notes: chiefly African and Australian as published in The Botanical Exchange Club and Society of the British Isles Report for 1916 There are three known synonyms; Baeckea obovata, Scholtzia obovata and Baeckea involucrata.

It is found on sand plains and ridges along the west coast in the Wheatbelt and Peel regions of Western Australia where it grows in sandy soils. The plant is part of the understorey in kwongan or Banksia woodland communities.
