= Scholtzia capitata =

Scientific classification
- Kingdom: Plantae
- Clade: Tracheophytes
- Clade: Angiosperms
- Clade: Eudicots
- Clade: Rosids
- Order: Myrtales
- Family: Myrtaceae
- Genus: Scholtzia
- Species: S. capitata

Binomial name
- Scholtzia capitata Benth.

Species of shrub

Scholtzia capitata is a shrub species in the family Myrtaceae that is endemic to Western Australia.

The erect shrub typically grows to a height of 0.3 to 2.5 metres (1.0 to 8.2 ft). It blooms between July and December producing pink-white flowers. The plant has little foliage and are used as a bunched cut flower.

It is found in undulating terrain and in winter wet depressions in the Mid West and Wheatbelt regions of Western Australia where it grows in sandy soils.

The species was first formally described by the botanist George Bentham in 1867 in the work Orders XLVIII. Myrtaceae- LXII. Compositae. in Flora Australiensis. The only synonym is Baeckea capitata as described by Ferdinand von Mueller in 1882 in Systematic Census of Australian Plants.
