= Scholtzia leptantha =

Scientific classification
- Kingdom: Plantae
- Clade: Tracheophytes
- Clade: Angiosperms
- Clade: Eudicots
- Clade: Rosids
- Order: Myrtales
- Family: Myrtaceae
- Genus: Scholtzia
- Species: S. leptantha

Binomial name
- Scholtzia leptantha Benth.

Species of shrub

Scholtzia leptantha is a shrub species in the family Myrtaceae that is endemic to Western Australia.

The spreading shrub typically grows to a height of 0.5 to 2 metres (1.6 to 6.6 ft) and up to 3 metres (10 ft) wide. It blooms between June and November producing white flowers.

It is found on dunes along the west coast in the Mid West and Wheatbelt regions of Western Australia between Shark Bay and Dandaragan where it grows in sandy soils.
