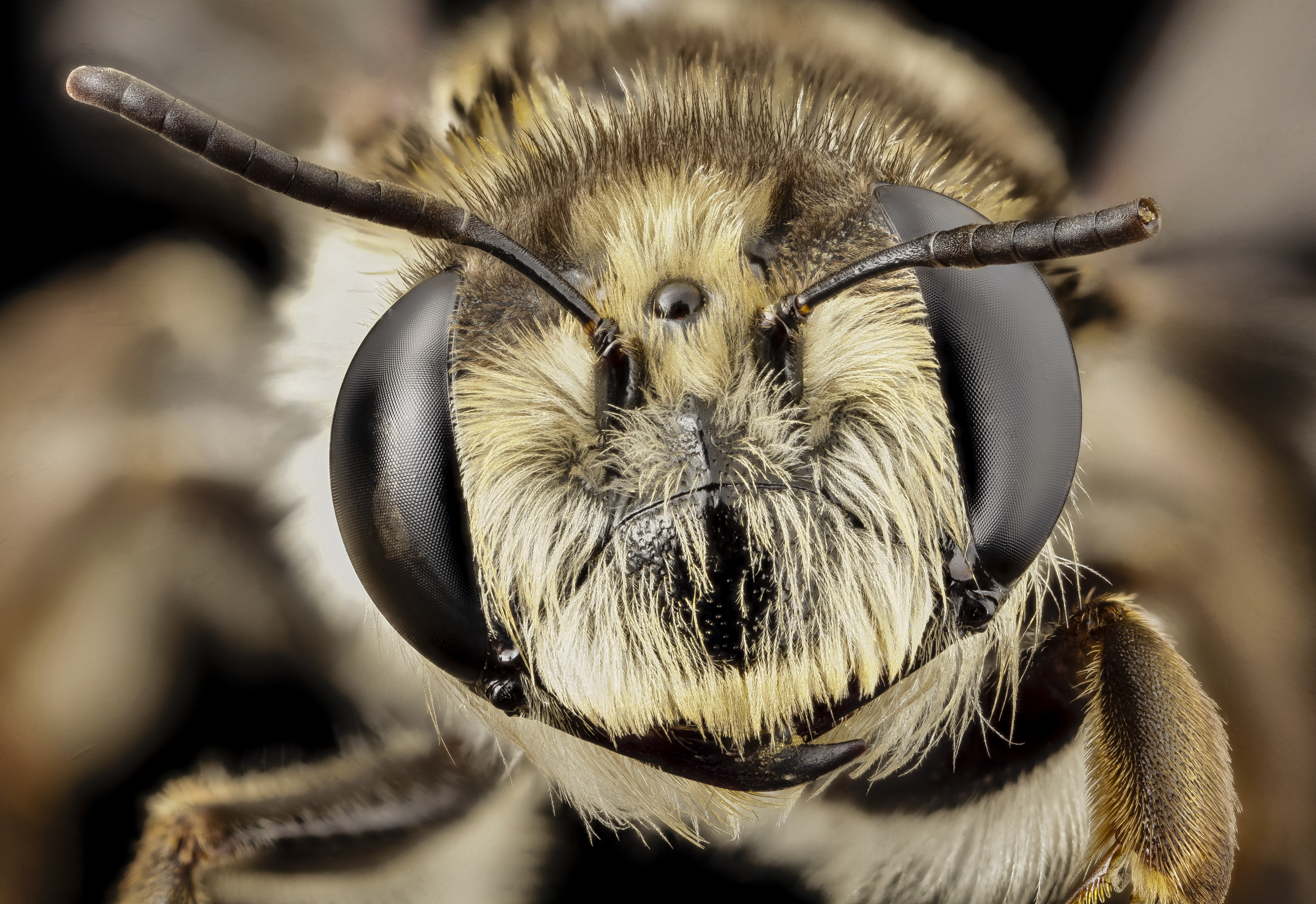
- Stenotritus pubescens

Scientific classification
- Kingdom: Animalia
- Phylum: Arthropoda
- Clade: Pancrustacea
- Class: Insecta
- Order: Hymenoptera
- Infraorder: Aculeata
- Superfamily: Apoidea
- Clade: Anthophila
- Family: Stenotritidae
- Genus: Stenotritus; Smith, 1853

Synonyms
- Oestropsis Smith, 1868; Gastropsis Smith, 1868; Melitribus Rayment, 1930

= Stenotritus =

Genus of bees

Stenotritus is the type genus of bees in the family Stenotritidae. Species are endemic to Australia and the genus was described in 1853 by English entomologist Frederick Smith.

== Species ==
As of August 2026 the genus contained the following valid species:

1. Stenotritus elegans Smith, 1853
2. Stenotritus elegantior Cockerell, 1921
3. Stenotritus ferricornis (Cockerell, 1916)
4. Stenotritus greavesi (Rayment, 1930)
5. Stenotritus murrayensis (Rayment, 1935)
6. Stenotritus nigrescens (Friese, 1924)
7. Stenotritus nitidus (Smith, 1879)
8. Stenotritus pubescens (Smith, 1868)
9. Stenotritus rufocollaris (Cockerell, 1921)
10. Stenotritus splendidus (Rayment, 1930)
11. Stenotritus taylori Houston, 2025
12. Stenotritus victoriae (Cockerell, 1906)
