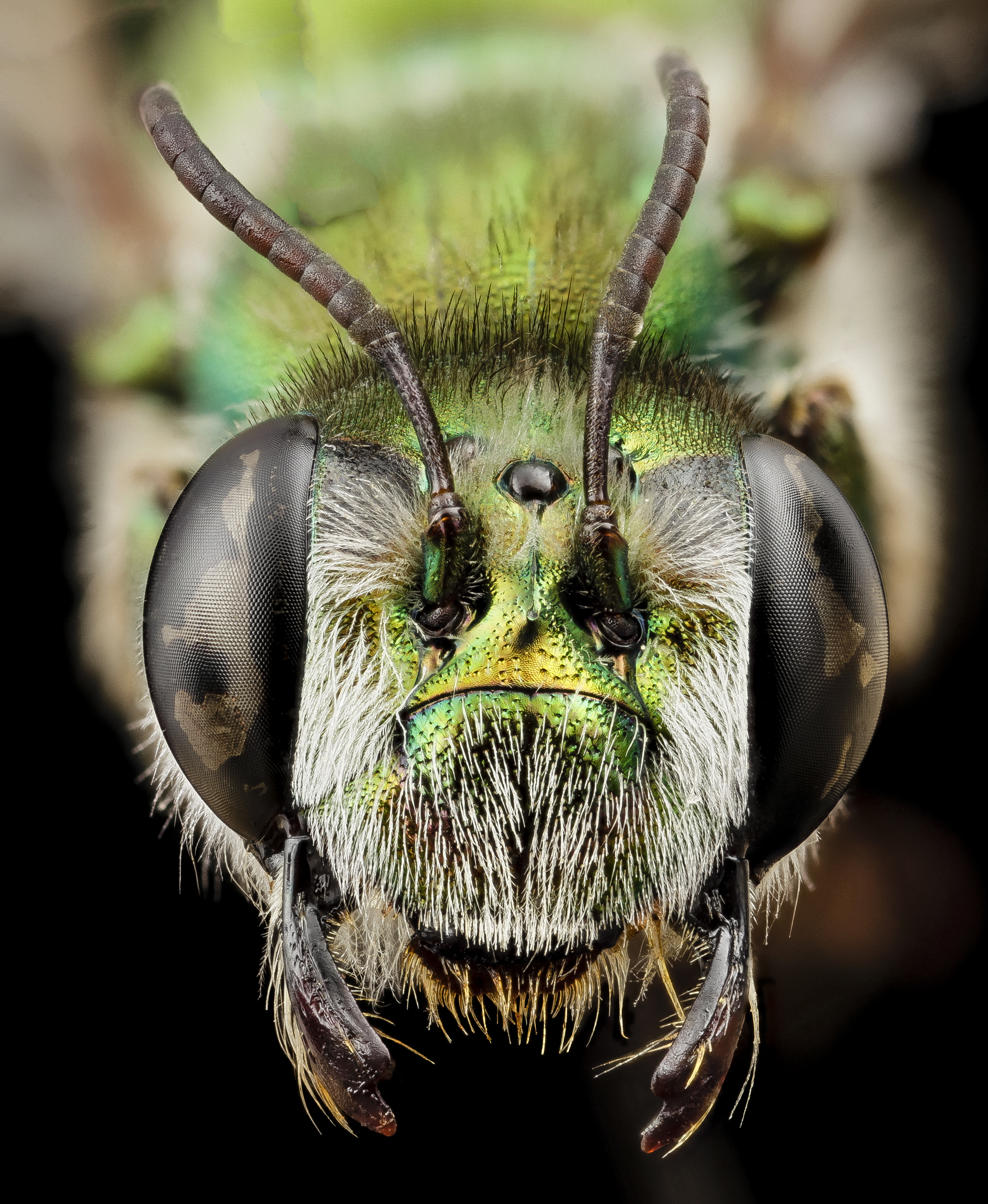
- Ctenocolletes smaragdinus

Scientific classification
- Kingdom: Animalia
- Phylum: Arthropoda
- Class: Insecta
- Order: Hymenoptera
- Superfamily: Apoidea
- Clade: Anthophila
- Family: Stenotritidae
- Genus: Ctenocolletes; Cockerell, 1929

= Ctenocolletes =

Genus of bees

Ctenocolletes is a genus of bees in the family Stenotritidae. Species are endemic to Australia and the genus was described in 1929 by American entomologist Theodore Cockerell.

== Species ==
As of 2025 the genus contained 10 valid species:

- Ctenocolletes albomarginatus Michener, 1965
- Ctenocolletes centralis Houston, 1983
- Ctenocolletes fulvescens Houston, 1983
- Ctenocolletes nicholsoni (Cockerell, 1929)
- Ctenocolletes nigricans Houston, 1985
- Ctenocolletes ordensis Michener, 1965
- Ctenocolletes rufescens Houston, 1983
- Ctenocolletes smaragdinus (Smith, 1868)
- Ctenocolletes tigris Houston, 1983
- Ctenocolletes tricolor Houston, 1983
