= Scholtzia ciliata =

Scientific classification
- Kingdom: Plantae
- Clade: Tracheophytes
- Clade: Angiosperms
- Clade: Eudicots
- Clade: Rosids
- Order: Myrtales
- Family: Myrtaceae
- Genus: Scholtzia
- Species: S. ciliata

Binomial name
- Scholtzia ciliata F.Muell.

Species of shrub

Scholtzia ciliata is a shrub species in the family Myrtaceae that is endemic to Western Australia.

The erect to spreading shrub typically grows to a height of 0.4 to 1.5 metres (1.3 to 4.9 ft). It blooms between August and December producing pink-white flowers.

It is found on low hills along the west coast in the Mid West and Wheatbelt regions of Western Australia between Northampton and Dandaragan where it grows in sandy or clay soils.
