= Scholtzia spatulata =

Scientific classification
- Kingdom: Plantae
- Clade: Tracheophytes
- Clade: Angiosperms
- Clade: Eudicots
- Clade: Rosids
- Order: Myrtales
- Family: Myrtaceae
- Genus: Scholtzia
- Species: S. spatulata

Binomial name
- Scholtzia spatulata (Turcz.) Benth.

Species of shrub

Scholtzia spatulata is a shrub species in the family Myrtaceae that is endemic to Western Australia.

The shrub typically grows to a height of 0.3 to 1.5 metres (1.0 to 4.9 ft). It blooms between September and January producing pink-white flowers.

It is found on sandplains along the west coast in the Mid West region of Western Australia around Northampton where it grows in sandy soils.
