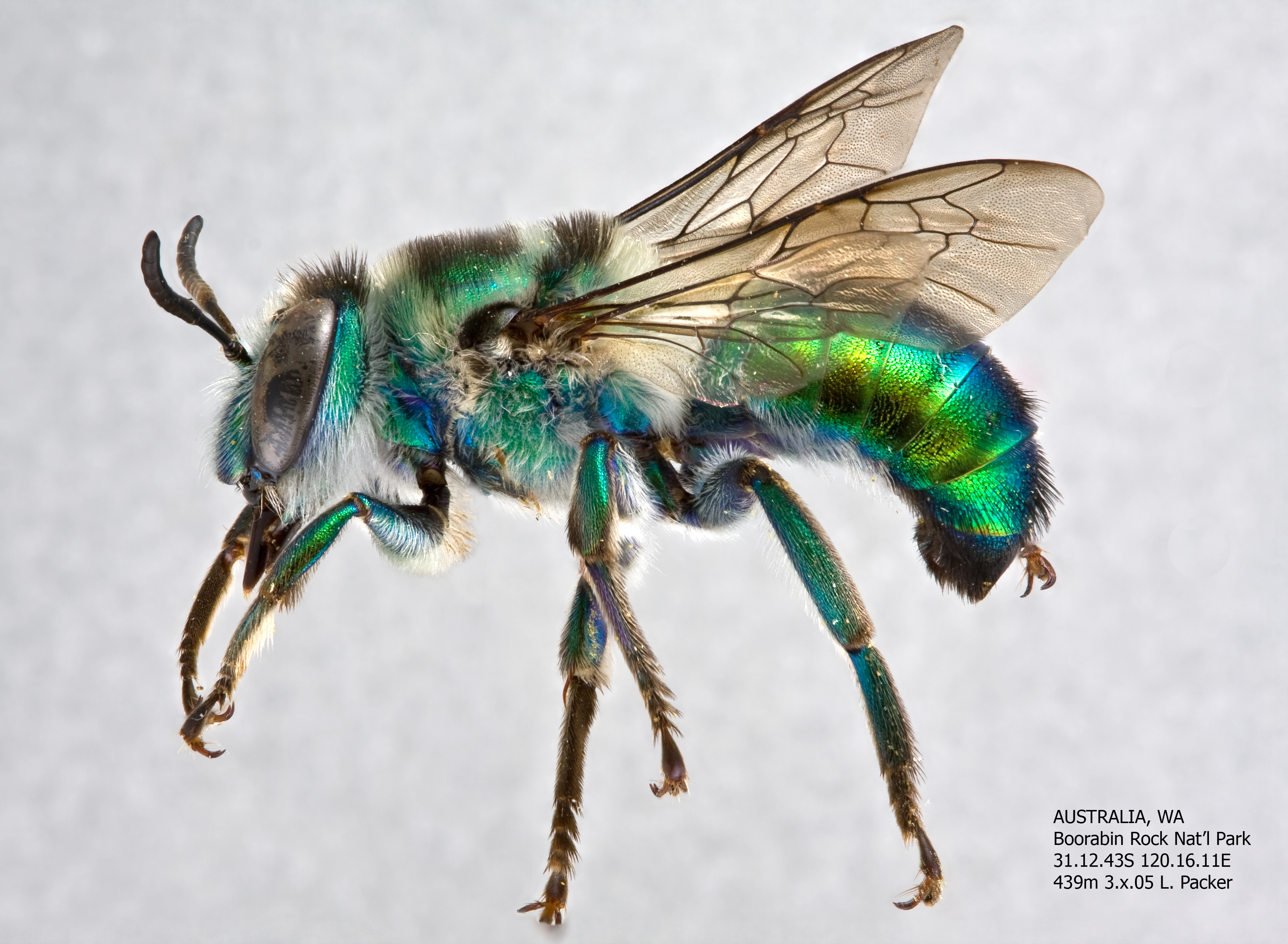

Scientific classification
- Kingdom: Animalia
- Phylum: Arthropoda
- Clade: Pancrustacea
- Class: Insecta
- Order: Hymenoptera
- Family: Stenotritidae
- Genus: Ctenocolletes
- Species: C. smaragdinus

Binomial name
- Ctenocolletes smaragdinus (Smith, 1868)

Synonyms
- Stenotritus smaragdinus Smith, 1868; Melitribus glauerti Rayment, 1930; Stenotritus speciosus Rayment, 1935

= Ctenocolletes smaragdinus =

Species of bee

Ctenocolletes smaragdinus is a species of bee in the family Stenotritidae. It is endemic to Australia. It was described in 1868 by English entomologist Frederick Smith.

== Description ==
The body length of males is 14–16 mm; that of females 17–19 mm. It is distinguished from its congeners by its brilliant metallic green integument and sparse pubescence.

== Distribution and habitat ==
The species occurs in south-western Western Australia. The holotype was collected at Champion Bay. Flowering plants visited by the bees include Leptospermum, Melaleuca, Grevillea, Verticordia and Baeckea species.

== Behaviour ==
The adults are solitary, flying mellivores that nest in burrows dug in soil; the larvae are sedentary.
