= Homalocalyx echinulatus =

Conservation status
- Priority Three — Poorly Known Taxa (DEC)

Scientific classification
- Kingdom: Plantae
- Clade: Tracheophytes
- Clade: Angiosperms
- Clade: Eudicots
- Clade: Rosids
- Order: Myrtales
- Family: Myrtaceae
- Genus: Homalocalyx
- Species: H. echinulatus

Binomial name
- Homalocalyx echinulatus Craven

Species of flowering plant

Homalocalyx echinulatus is a member of the family Myrtaceae endemic to Western Australia.

The shrub typically grows to a height of 0.45 to 1 metre (1.5 to 3.3 ft). It blooms between June and September producing pink flowers.

It is found on sandstone hills and breakaway in the eastern Mid West and the central Goldfields-Esperance region of Western Australia centred around Wiluna where it grows in sandy soils.
