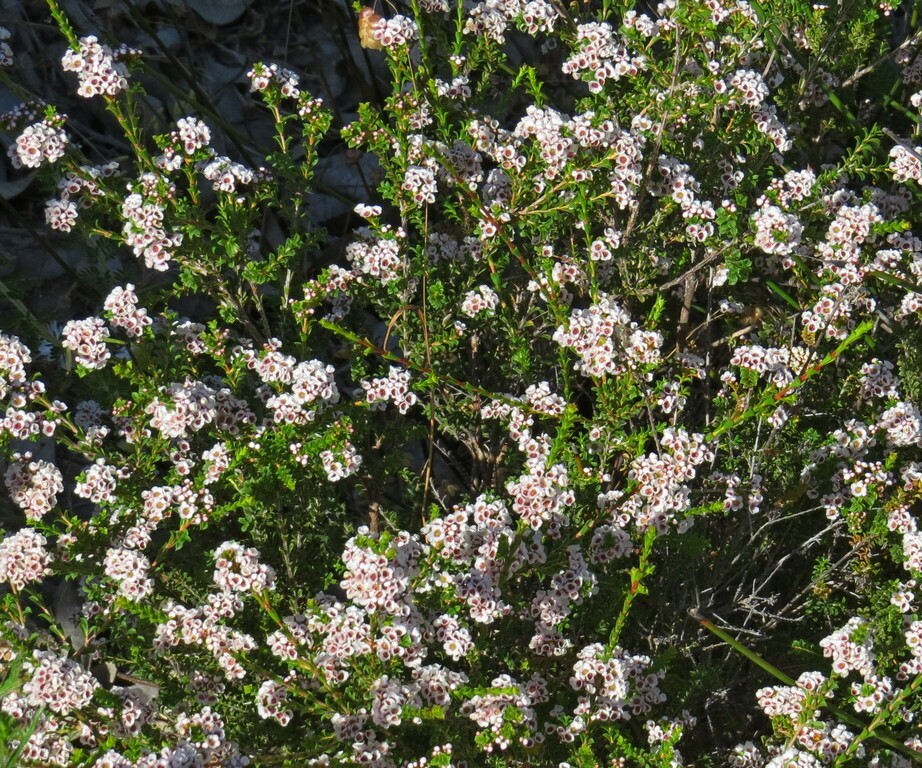

Scientific classification
- Kingdom: Plantae
- Clade: Tracheophytes
- Clade: Angiosperms
- Clade: Eudicots
- Clade: Rosids
- Order: Myrtales
- Family: Myrtaceae
- Genus: Scholtzia
- Species: S. obovata

Binomial name
- Scholtzia obovata (DC.) Schauer

Synonyms
- List: Baeckea leptantha (Benth.) F.Muell.; Baeckea obovata DC; Pritzelia obovata (DC.) S.Schauer; Scholtzia leptantha Benth.

= Scholtzia obovata =

Species of shrub

Scholtzia obovata is a species of subshrub or shrub in the family Myrtaceae that is endemic to Western Australia. The shrub is found along the west coast in the Gascoyne region of Western Australia between Shark Bay and Carnarvon where it grows in sandy soils.

== Taxonomy ==
The species was first formally published in 1828 as Baeckea obovata.

== Distribution and habitat ==
The species is native to the coast of the Gascoyne region in Western Australia. It is found between Shark Bay and Carnarvon where it grows in sandy soils.
