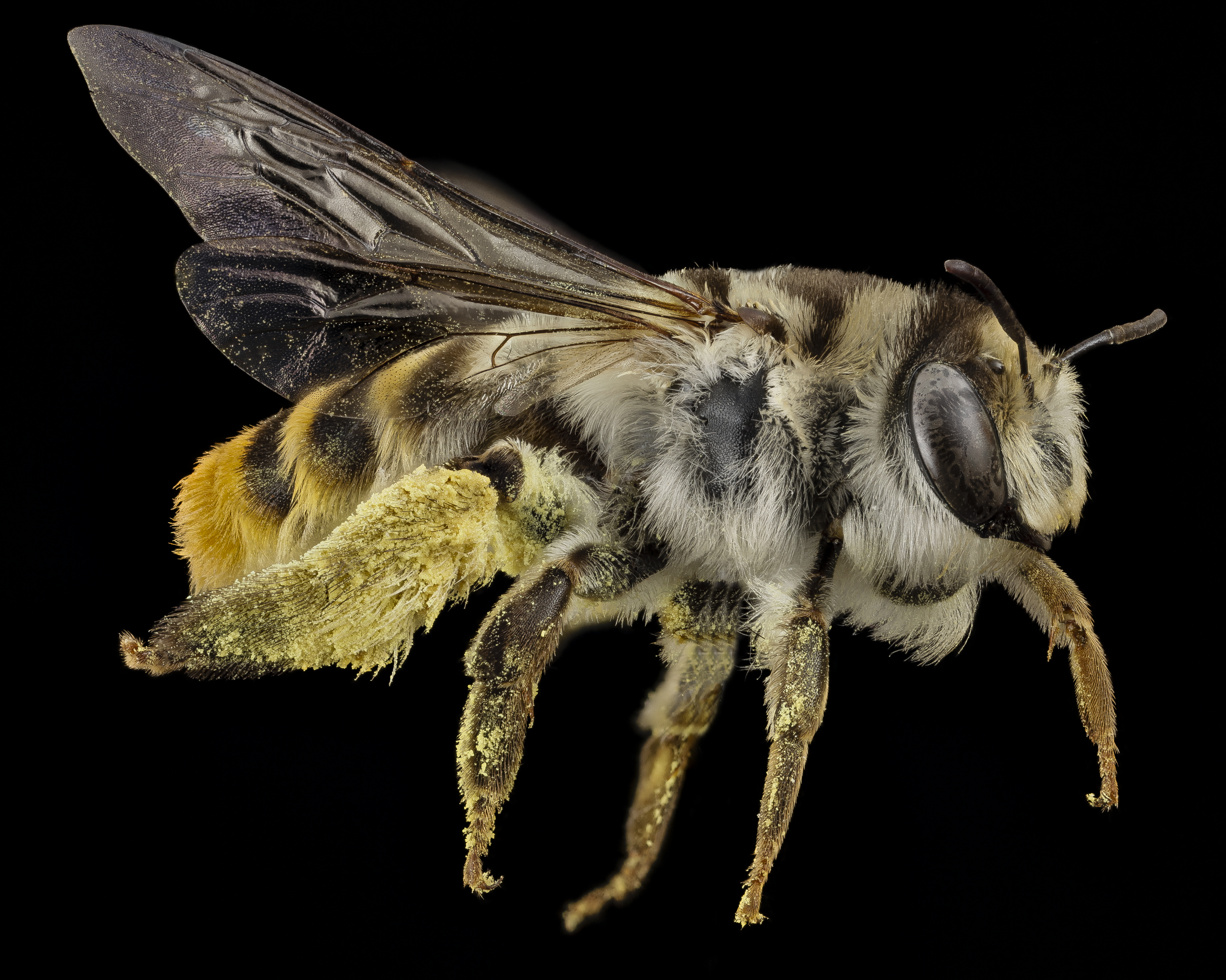

Scientific classification
- Kingdom: Animalia
- Phylum: Arthropoda
- Clade: Pancrustacea
- Class: Insecta
- Order: Hymenoptera
- Family: Stenotritidae
- Genus: Stenotritus
- Species: S. pubescens

Binomial name
- Stenotritus pubescens (Smith, 1868)

Synonyms
- Oestropsis pubescens Smith, 1868

= Stenotritus pubescens =

Species of bee

Stenotritus pubescens is a species of bee in the family Stenotritidae. It is endemic to Australia. It was described in 1868 by English entomologist Frederick Smith.

== Distribution and habitat ==
Published localities for the species include Finniss Springs Station in South Australia, Brisbane in Queensland and Victoria, with a syntype from Champion Bay near Geraldton in Western Australia.

== Behaviour ==
The adults are solitary, flying mellivores, with sedentary larvae. They nest in aggregations in burrows dug in soil. Flowering plants visited by the bees include Eucalyptus species.
