= Homalocalyx grandiflorus =

Conservation status
- Priority Three — Poorly Known Taxa (DEC)

Scientific classification
- Kingdom: Plantae
- Clade: Tracheophytes
- Clade: Angiosperms
- Clade: Eudicots
- Clade: Rosids
- Order: Myrtales
- Family: Myrtaceae
- Genus: Homalocalyx
- Species: H. grandiflorus

Binomial name
- Homalocalyx grandiflorus (C.A.Gardner) Craven

Species of flowering plant

Homalocalyx grandiflorus is a member of the family Myrtaceae endemic to Western Australia.

The spreading shrub typically grows to a height of 0.2 to 0.5 metres (0.7 to 1.6 ft) but can reach as high as 2 m (7 ft). It blooms between October and December producing red-pink-purple flowers.

It is found on sand plains in the Goldfields-Esperance region in a small area north of Kalgoorlie of Western Australia where it grows in sandy soils.
