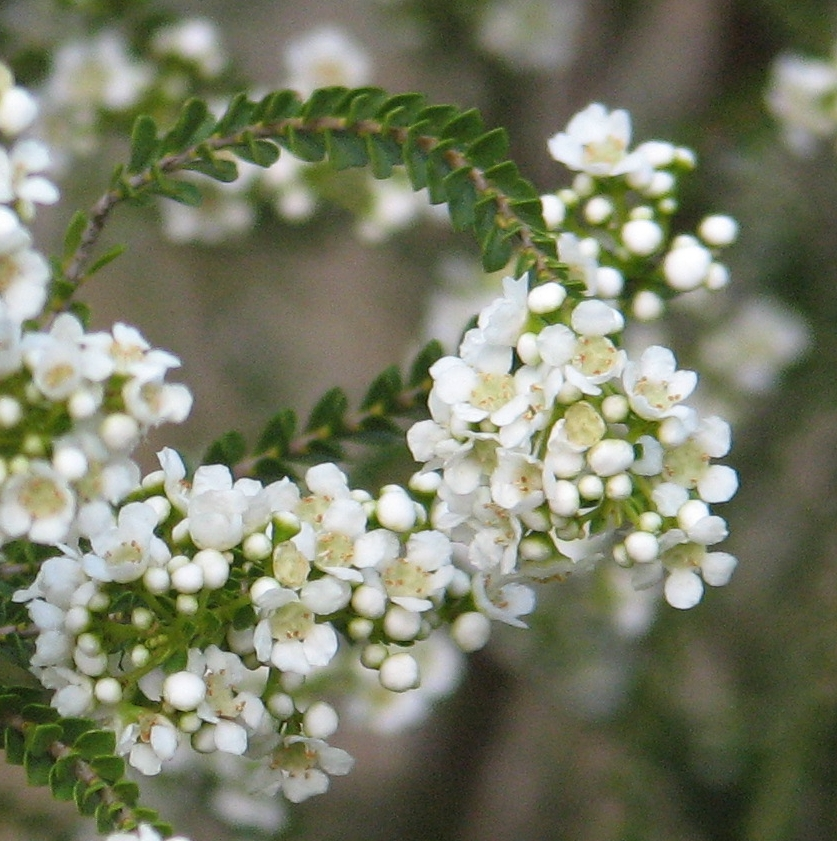

Scientific classification
- Kingdom: Plantae
- Clade: Tracheophytes
- Clade: Angiosperms
- Clade: Eudicots
- Clade: Rosids
- Order: Myrtales
- Family: Myrtaceae
- Genus: Scholtzia
- Species: S. oligandra

Binomial name
- Scholtzia oligandra Benth.

Synonyms
- Baeckea oligandra (Benth.) F.Muell.

= Scholtzia oligandra =

Species of shrub

Scholtzia oligandra, commonly known as pink scholtzia, is a shrub species in the family Myrtaceae. It grows to between 1 and 3 metres high and produces white or pink flowers between July and October in the species' native range. The species, which is endemic to Western Australia, was first formally described in 1867 by English botanist George Bentham in Flora Australiensis based on plant material collected by James Drummond on the Murchison River.
