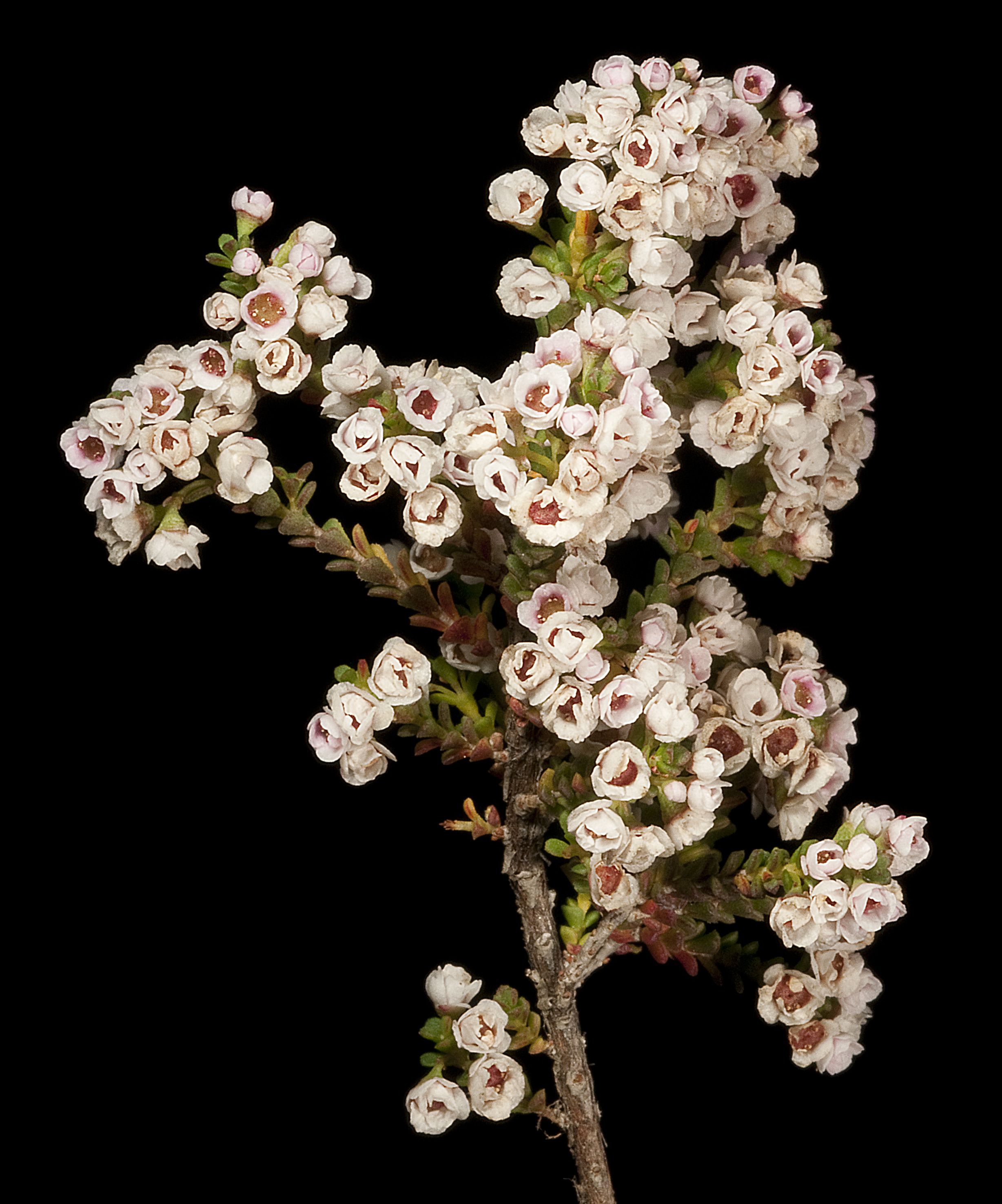
- Scholtzia parviflora flowers

Scientific classification
- Kingdom: Plantae
- Clade: Tracheophytes
- Clade: Angiosperms
- Clade: Eudicots
- Clade: Rosids
- Order: Myrtales
- Family: Myrtaceae
- Genus: Scholtzia
- Species: S. parviflora

Binomial name
- Scholtzia parviflora F.Muell.

= Scholtzia parviflora =

Species of shrub

Scholtzia parviflora is a shrub species in the family Myrtaceae that is endemic to Western Australia.

The shrub typically grows to a height of 1 to 3 metres (3.3 to 9.8 ft). The plant has a spreading habit with decumbent branches. The evergreen leaves have a length of 1 to 2 millimetres (0.039 to 0.079 in) and no prominent veins. It blooms between August and October producing pink-white flowers. The flowers have a diameter of around 5 mm (0.197 in) and are on pedicels about the same length as the leaves. The plant superficially resembles Scholtzia uberiflora but is much more widespread.

The species was first formally described by the botanist Ferdinand von Mueller in 1864 as part of the work Fragmenta Phytographiae Australiae. The only known synonym is Baeckea parviflora.

It is found in wet depressions in the Mid West and Wheatbelt regions of Western Australia between Geraldton and Cunderdin where it grows in sandy soils over laterite. It is part of the understorey in kwongan shrubland communities.
