= Homalocalyx ericaeus =

Conservation status
- Priority Two — Poorly Known Taxa (DEC)

Scientific classification
- Kingdom: Plantae
- Clade: Tracheophytes
- Clade: Angiosperms
- Clade: Eudicots
- Clade: Rosids
- Order: Myrtales
- Family: Myrtaceae
- Genus: Homalocalyx
- Species: H. ericaeus

Binomial name
- Homalocalyx ericaeus F.Muell.

Species of flowering plant

Homalocalyx ericaeus is a member of the family Myrtaceae endemic to Western Australia.

The shrub typically grows to a height of 0.3 to 1.0 metre (1.0 to 3.3 ft). It blooms between July and August producing white flowers.

It is found on sandstone plateaus in a small area in the east Kimberley region of Western Australia where it grows in shallow soils.
