= Homalocalyx aureus =

Scientific classification
- Kingdom: Plantae
- Clade: Tracheophytes
- Clade: Angiosperms
- Clade: Eudicots
- Clade: Rosids
- Order: Myrtales
- Family: Myrtaceae
- Genus: Homalocalyx
- Species: H. aureus

Binomial name
- Homalocalyx aureus (C.A.Gardner) Craven

Species of flowering plant

Homalocalyx aureus is a member of the family Myrtaceae endemic to Western Australia.

The shrub typically grows to a height of 0.4 to 2 metres (1 to 7 ft). It blooms between July and November producing yellow flowers.

It is found on sand plains in an area from the Mid West and into the northern Wheatbelt regions of Western Australia on sandy soils over laterite.
