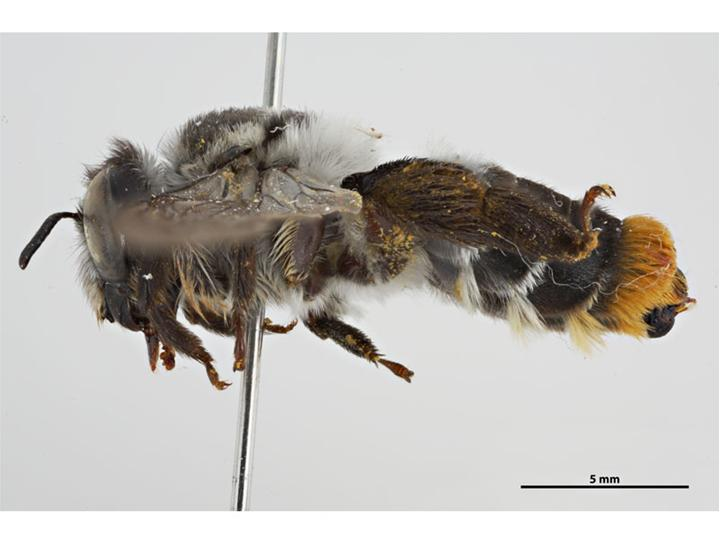
- Female

Scientific classification
- Kingdom: Animalia
- Phylum: Arthropoda
- Clade: Pancrustacea
- Class: Insecta
- Order: Hymenoptera
- Family: Stenotritidae
- Genus: Stenotritus
- Species: S. greavesi

Binomial name
- Stenotritus greavesi Rayment, 1930

Synonyms
- Melitribus greavesi Rayment, 1930

= Stenotritus greavesi =

Species of bee

Stenotritus greavesi is a species of bee in the family Stenotritidae. It is endemic to Australia. It was described in 1930 by Australian entomologist Tarlton Rayment.

== Distribution and habitat ==
The species occurs in Western Australia. The holotype was collected at Bungulla in the Wheatbelt region.

== Behaviour ==
The adults are solitary, flying mellivores, with sedentary larvae, which nest in burrows dug in soil. Flowering plants visited by the bees include Baeckea, Callistemon, Cheiranthera, Hakea, Leptospermum, Melaleuca and Verticordia species.

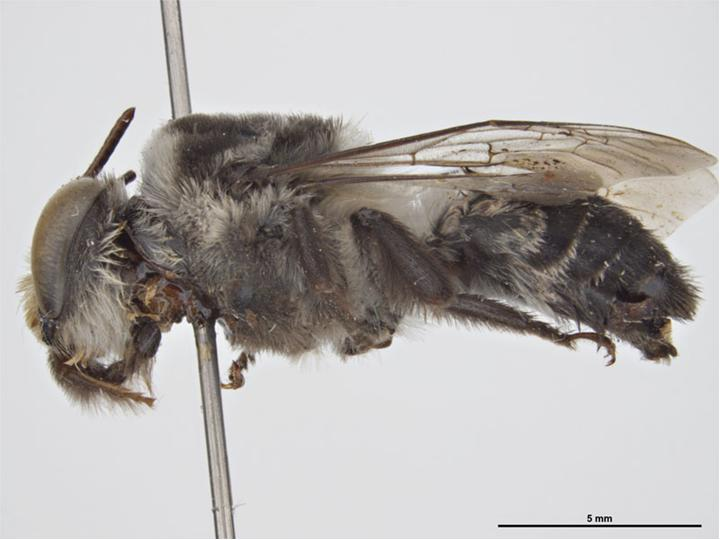
Male
