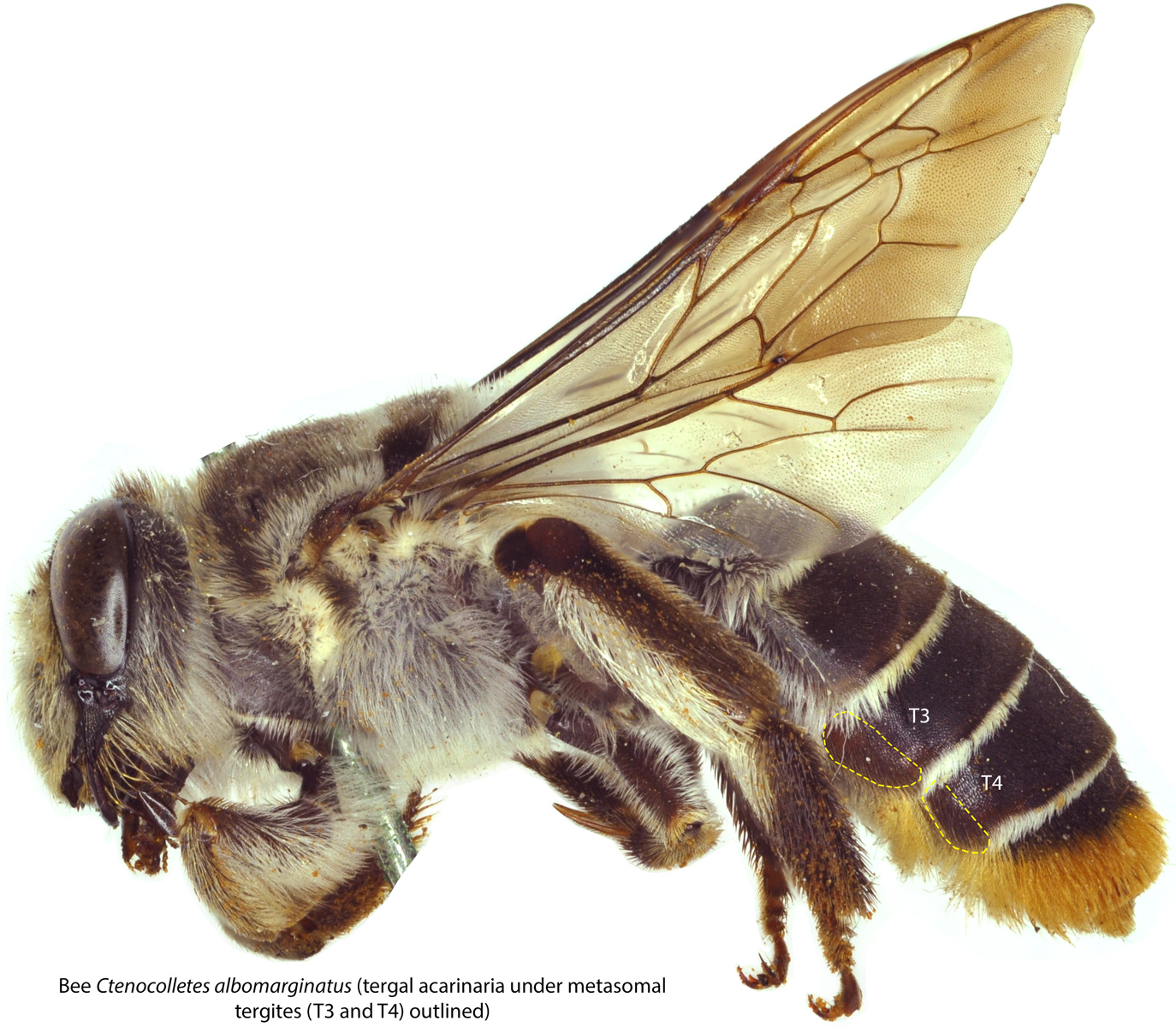

Scientific classification
- Kingdom: Animalia
- Phylum: Arthropoda
- Clade: Pancrustacea
- Class: Insecta
- Order: Hymenoptera
- Family: Stenotritidae
- Genus: Ctenocolletes
- Species: C. albomarginatus

Binomial name
- Ctenocolletes albomarginatus Michener, 1965

= Ctenocolletes albomarginatus =

Species of bee

Ctenocolletes albomarginatus is a species of bee in the family Stenotritidae. The species is endemic to Australia. It was described in 1965 by American entomologist Charles Duncan Michener.

== Description ==
The body length of males is 14–16 mm; that of females 18–19 mm.

== Distribution and habitat ==
The species occurs in southern Western Australia. The holotype was collected six miles north of Watheroo in the Wheatbelt region.

== Behaviour ==
The adults are solitary, flying mellivores; the larvae are sedentary.
