= Scholtzia umbellifera =

Scientific classification
- Kingdom: Plantae
- Clade: Tracheophytes
- Clade: Angiosperms
- Clade: Eudicots
- Clade: Rosids
- Order: Myrtales
- Family: Myrtaceae
- Genus: Scholtzia
- Species: S. umbellifera

Binomial name
- Scholtzia umbellifera F.Muell.

Species of shrub

Scholtzia umbellifera is a shrub species in the family Myrtaceae that is endemic to Western Australia.

The shrub typically grows to a height of 0.4 to 2 metres (1.3 to 6.6 ft). It blooms between August and December producing pink-white flowers.

It is found on sandplains and among limestone outcrops along the west coast in the Mid West and Gascoyne regions of Western Australia between Shark Bay and Dandaragan where it grows in sandy soils over laterite or limestone.
