= Homalocalyx inerrabundus =

Conservation status
- Priority Two — Poorly Known Taxa (DEC)

Scientific classification
- Kingdom: Plantae
- Clade: Tracheophytes
- Clade: Angiosperms
- Clade: Eudicots
- Clade: Rosids
- Order: Myrtales
- Family: Myrtaceae
- Genus: Homalocalyx
- Species: H. inerrabundus

Binomial name
- Homalocalyx inerrabundus Craven

Species of flowering plant

Homalocalyx inerrabundus is a member of the family Myrtaceae endemic to Western Australia.

The shrub typically grows to a height of 0.5 metres (1.6 ft). It blooms between September and November producing violet-pink flowers.

It is found on sand plains in a small are in the Mid West region of Western Australia near Geraldton where it grows in sandy and sandy-loamy soils.
