= Scholtzia teretifolia =

Scientific classification
- Kingdom: Plantae
- Clade: Tracheophytes
- Clade: Angiosperms
- Clade: Eudicots
- Clade: Rosids
- Order: Myrtales
- Family: Myrtaceae
- Genus: Scholtzia
- Species: S. teretifolia

Binomial name
- Scholtzia teretifolia Benth.

Species of shrub

Scholtzia teretifolia is a shrub species in the family Myrtaceae that is endemic to Western Australia.

The prostrate and spreading shrub typically grows to a height of 0.1 to 0.2 metres (0.3 to 0.7 ft) and can reach as high as 0.5 m (1.6 ft), it usually has a width of about 1.3 m (4.3 ft). It blooms between October and January producing pink-white flowers.

It is found on sandplains and floodplains along the west coast in the Wheatbelt region of Western Australia between Carnamah and Gingin where it grows in sandy soils.
