= Homalocalyx pulcherrimus =

Scientific classification
- Kingdom: Plantae
- Clade: Tracheophytes
- Clade: Angiosperms
- Clade: Eudicots
- Clade: Rosids
- Order: Myrtales
- Family: Myrtaceae
- Genus: Homalocalyx
- Species: H. pulcherrimus

Binomial name
- Homalocalyx pulcherrimus (Ewart & B.Rees) Craven

Species of flowering plant

Homalocalyx pulcherrimus is a member of the family Myrtaceae endemic to Western Australia.

The spreading to semi-prostrate shrub typically grows to a height of 0.1 to 0.6 metres (0.3 to 2.0 ft). It blooms between September and December producing red-pink-purple flowers.

It is found on sand plains in an area where the Goldfields-Esperance meets the Wheatbelt region of Western Australia between Kondinin and Coolgardie where it grows in sandy soils.
