= Homalocalyx chapmanii =

Scientific classification
- Kingdom: Plantae
- Clade: Tracheophytes
- Clade: Angiosperms
- Clade: Eudicots
- Clade: Rosids
- Order: Myrtales
- Family: Myrtaceae
- Genus: Homalocalyx
- Species: H. chapmanii

Binomial name
- Homalocalyx chapmanii Craven

Species of flowering plant

Homalocalyx chapmanii is a member of the family Myrtaceae endemic to Western Australia.

The shrub typically grows to a height of 0.2 to 0.5 metres (0.7 to 1.6 ft). It blooms between September and October producing red-pink-purple flowers.

It is found on undulating plains and among weather granite in the northern Wheatbelt region of Western Australia between Carnamah and Three Springs where it grows in sandy soils.
