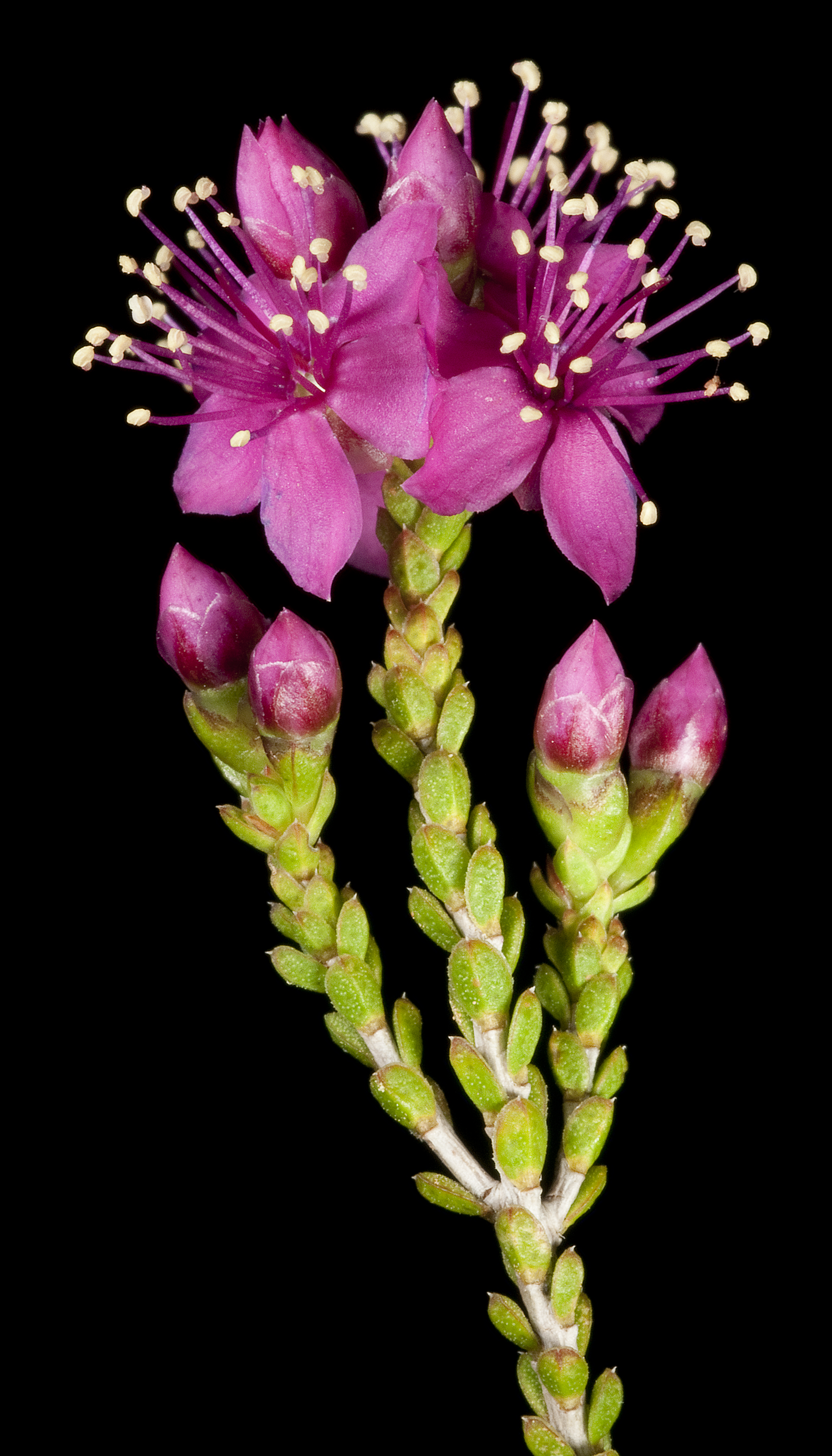

Scientific classification
- Kingdom: Plantae
- Clade: Tracheophytes
- Clade: Angiosperms
- Clade: Eudicots
- Clade: Rosids
- Order: Myrtales
- Family: Myrtaceae
- Genus: Homalocalyx
- Species: H. thryptomenoides

Binomial name
- Homalocalyx thryptomenoides (F.Muell.) Craven

= Homalocalyx thryptomenoides =

Species of flowering plant

Homalocalyx thryptomenoides is a member of the family Myrtaceae endemic to Western Australia.

The shrub typically grows to a height of 0.2 to 1.0 metre (0.7 to 3.3 ft). It blooms between July and November producing pink-purple-red flowers.

It is found on sand plains in a large area in the Mid West, Wheatbelt and Goldfields-Esperance regions of Western Australia where it grows in sandy soils.
