= Scholtzia uberiflora =

Scientific classification
- Kingdom: Plantae
- Clade: Tracheophytes
- Clade: Angiosperms
- Clade: Eudicots
- Clade: Rosids
- Order: Myrtales
- Family: Myrtaceae
- Genus: Scholtzia
- Species: S. uberiflora

Binomial name
- Scholtzia uberiflora F.Muell.

Species of shrub

Scholtzia uberiflora is a shrub species in the family Myrtaceae that is endemic to Western Australia.

The open and straggly shrub typically grows to a height of 0.5 to 2.5 metres (1.6 to 8.2 ft) and to 3 m (10 ft) wide. It has long arching branches that can cover heathland plants below. The leaves have a length of around 6 millimetres (0.236 in) and an orbicular shape. It blooms between May and October producing pink-white flowers. The flowers have a diameter of around 4 to 5 mm (0.157 to 0.197 in).

The species was first formally described by the botanist Ferdinand von Mueller in 1864 as part of the work Fragmenta Phytographiae Australiae. The only known synonym is Baeckea uberiflora.

It is found on sandplains and river flats along the west coast in the Mid West region of Western Australia around Northampton where it grows in sandy soils. It is associated with kwongan woodland communities.
