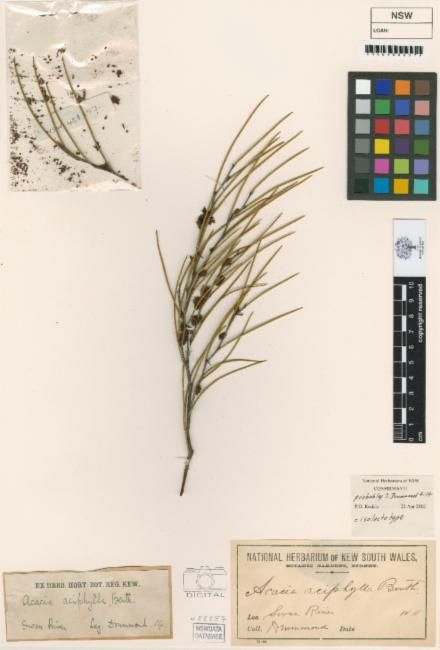

Scientific classification
- Kingdom: Plantae
- Clade: Tracheophytes
- Clade: Angiosperms
- Clade: Eudicots
- Clade: Rosids
- Order: Fabales
- Family: Fabaceae
- Subfamily: Caesalpinioideae
- Clade: Mimosoid clade
- Genus: Acacia
- Species: A. aciphylla

Binomial name
- Acacia aciphylla Benth.
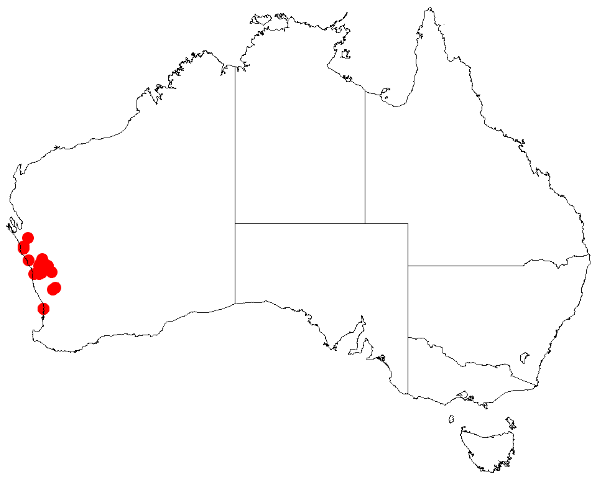
- Occurrence data from AVH

Synonyms
- Acacia aciphylla Benth. var. aciphylla; Racosperma aciphyllum (Benth.) Pedley

= Acacia aciphylla =

Species of legume

Acacia aciphylla is a species of flowering plant in the family Fabaceae and is endemic to the south-west of Western Australia. It is a bushy, prickly shrub with down-turned, rigid, sharply-pointed phyllodes, flowers arranged in oval heads usually arranged in pairs in leaf axils, and linear pods up to 90 mm (3.5 in) long.

== Description ==
The shrub is prickly with a dense and bushy habit typically growing to a height of 0.6 to 1.8 metres (2 to 6 ft). It has glabrous branchlets and phyllodes. The sessile phyllodes are decurrent on branchlets. They are rigid, erect, straight and terete to slightly rhombic in cross-section. Each phyllode is 6 to 12 centimetres (2.4 to 4.7 in) in length with a diameter of about 1.5 millimetres (0.06 in). It flowers from July to September producing densely packed golden-yellow flowers. The inflorescences are simple with two found 2 per axil. The heads of each inflorescence has an obloid shape and are about 6 to 9 millimetres (0.24 to 0.35 in) in length with a diameter of around 2 mm (0.08 in). Following flowering, seed pods are produced that have a linear shape that is slightly raised between seeds. the pods are straight with a length of about 9 cm (4 in) and a width of 2.5 mm (0.10 in).

== Taxonomy ==
The species was first formally described by the botanist George Bentham in 1855 in the journal Linnaea: Ein Journal für die Botanik in ihrem ganzen Umfange, oder Beiträge zur Pflanzenkunde. The specific epithet, (aciphylla) derives from the Latin, acinaces, meaning 'a short Persian sabre', and the Greek, phyllon, meaning 'leaf', and refers to the sharply-pointed leaves.

== Distribution and habitat ==
The plant grows in sandy, loamy and lateritic soils and on granite outcrops and rocky ridges in mixed shrub-land communities. It has a broken distribution between Kalbarri, Mullewa and Morawa.

== See also ==
- List of Acacia species
