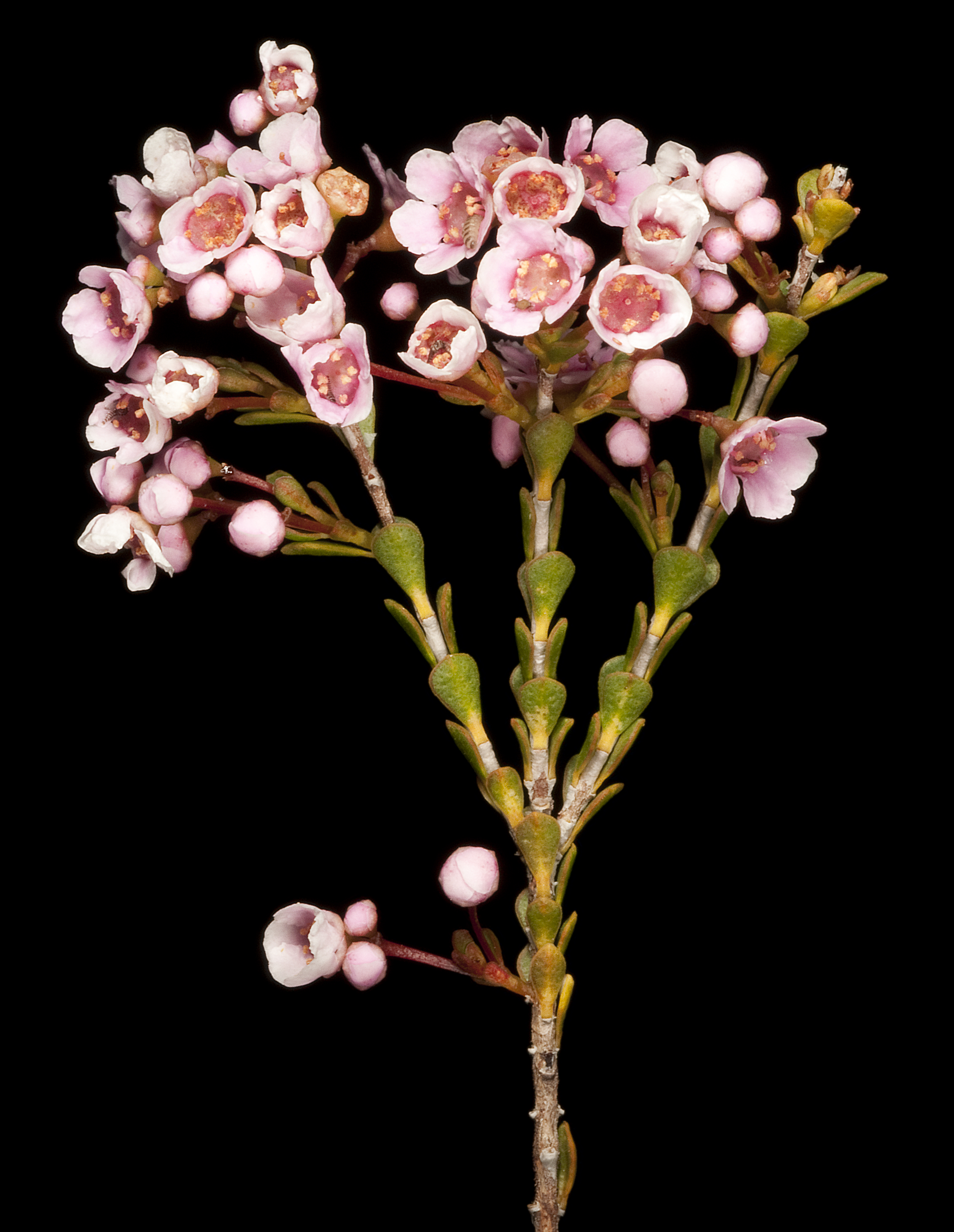
- Scholtzia laxiflora flowers

Scientific classification
- Kingdom: Plantae
- Clade: Tracheophytes
- Clade: Angiosperms
- Clade: Eudicots
- Clade: Rosids
- Order: Myrtales
- Family: Myrtaceae
- Genus: Scholtzia
- Species: S. laxiflora

Binomial name
- Scholtzia laxiflora Benth.

= Scholtzia laxiflora =

Species of shrub

Scholtzia laxiflora is a shrub species in the family Myrtaceae that is endemic to Western Australia.

The erect and bushy shrub typically grows to a height of 0.3 to 2 metres (1.0 to 6.6 ft) and as high as 3 metres (10 ft). It blooms between April and December producing pink-white flowers.

It is found on sand plains, winter wet flats and hillslopes along the west coast in the Mid West and Wheatbelt regions of Western Australia between Northampton and Dandaragan where it grows in sand to clay soils over laterite or limestone.
