= Scholtzia drummondii =

Scientific classification
- Kingdom: Plantae
- Clade: Tracheophytes
- Clade: Angiosperms
- Clade: Eudicots
- Clade: Rosids
- Order: Myrtales
- Family: Myrtaceae
- Genus: Scholtzia
- Species: S. drummondii

Binomial name
- Scholtzia drummondii Benth.

Species of shrub

Scholtzia drummondii is a shrub species in the family Myrtaceae that is endemic to Western Australia.

The shrub typically grows to a height of 0.5 to 1.5 metres (1.6 to 4.9 ft). It blooms between May and October producing pink-white flowers.

It is found on plains and ridges in the Wheatbelt region of Western Australia where it grows in gravelly-sandy soils.
