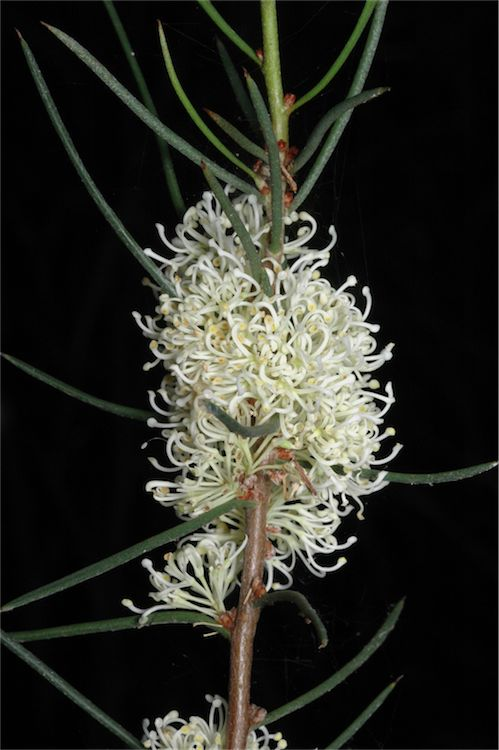
- Hakea candolleana in the ANBG

Scientific classification
- Kingdom: Plantae
- Clade: Tracheophytes
- Clade: Angiosperms
- Clade: Eudicots
- Order: Proteales
- Family: Proteaceae
- Genus: Hakea
- Species: H. candolleana

Binomial name
- Hakea candolleana Meisn.
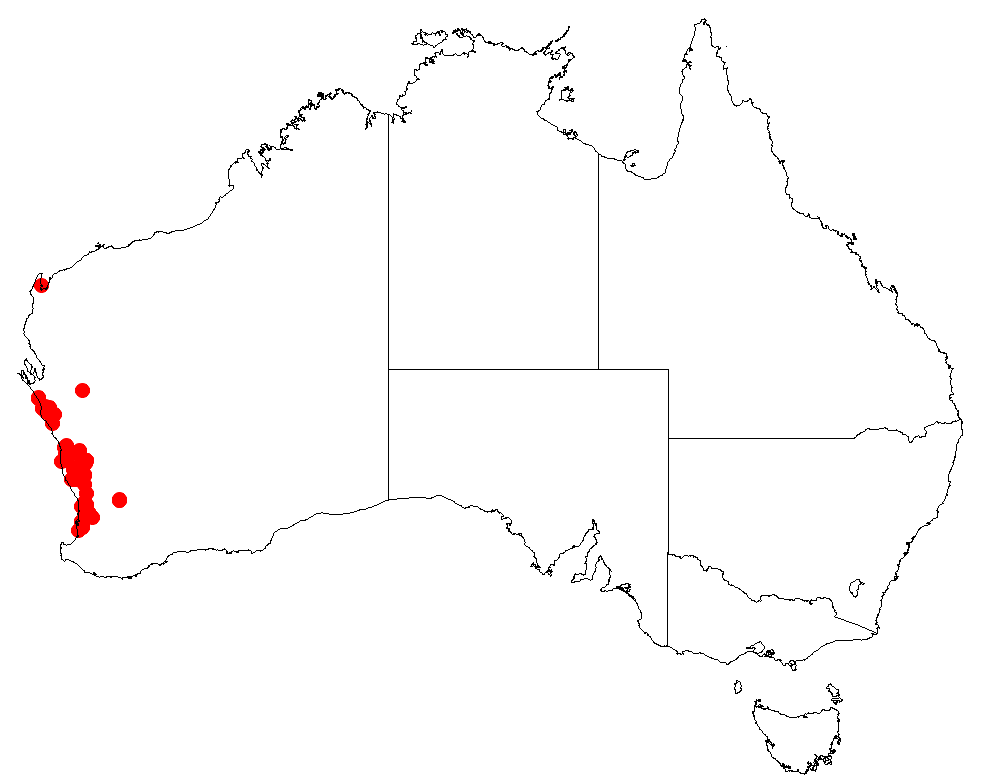
- Occurrence data from Australasian Virtual Herbarium

= Hakea candolleana =

Species of shrub native to Western Australia

Hakea candolleana is a shrub in the family Proteaceae native to areas along the west coast in the Wheatbelt and Mid West regions of Western Australia. A cream-white winter flowering species, useful as a garden ground cover.

== Description ==
Hakea candolleana is a dense low growing lignotuberous multi-stemmed shrub. Typically growing to a height of 0.15 to 1.6 metres (0.5 to 5.2 ft) generally wider than tall. Smaller branches are densely covered in short matted hairs or flattened fine silky hairs either white or rusty coloured. Occasionally, branches quickly become smooth and a bluish-green with a powdery film. The inflorescence consists of 6-8 very small white or cream flowers with a pink to greenish tinge on a stem 2–3 mm (0.08–0.1 in) long. The pedicel is 1.5–4 mm (0.06–0.2 in) long, white or cream-yellow and covered in long furry soft matted hairs or flattened silky hairs extending onto the lower part of the flower. The cream-white perianth is 2–2.6 mm (0.08–0.1 in) long. Faintly scented flowers appear in leaf axils from June to August. Leaves are alternate, flat and linear, sometimes needle-shaped ending in a hard blunt point. Length may be variable from 2.5–13 cm (1–5 in) long and 1–4 mm (0.04–0.2 in) wide, more or less the same length the entire leaf. Young leaves are covered in soft matted hairs, becoming smooth with age. Large, S-shaped fruit are smooth, 18–42 mm (0.7–2 in) long and 12–25 mm (0.5–1 in) wide aging to rough and pitted on the surface ending with an incurving beak.

== Taxonomy and naming ==
Hakea candolleana was first formally described by Carl Meissner in 1848. Hakea candolleana was named in honour of the Swiss botanist, Augustin Pyramus de Candolle.

== Distribution and habitat ==
Hakea candolleana grows in heath or shrubland on sand, loam and clay and requires an open sunny aspect. Often found in low lying seasonally wet areas. It grows from the northern sand plains at the Murchison River to Perth and an outlying community at Tammin.

== Conservation status ==
Hakea candolleana is presently listed as "not threatened" by Western Australian Government, Department of Parks and Wildlife.
