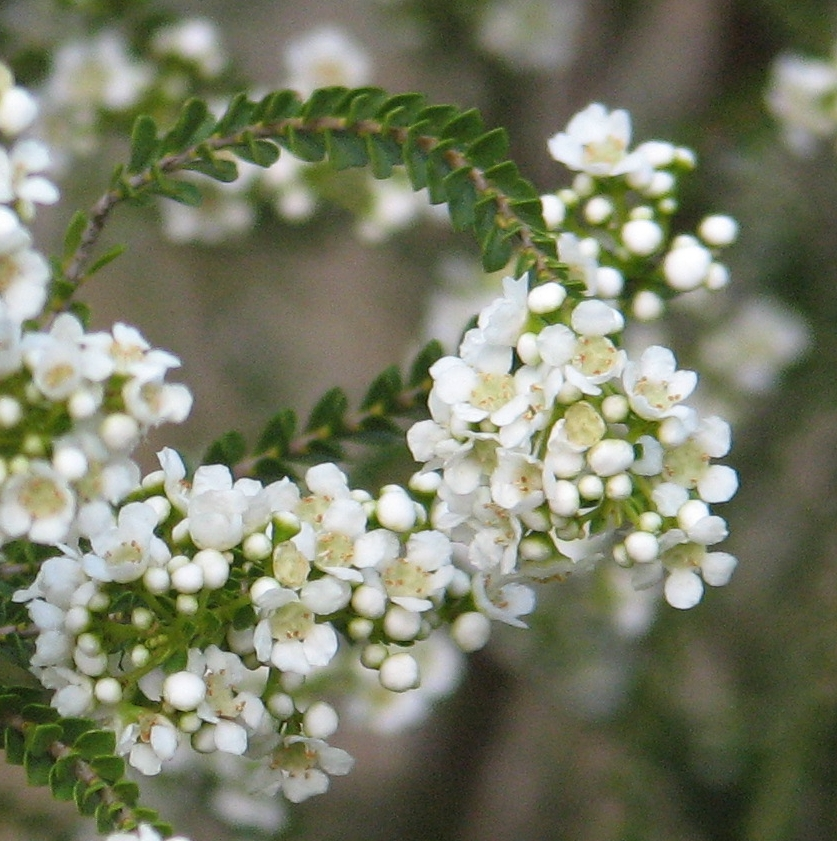
- Scholtzia oligandra

Scientific classification
- Kingdom: Plantae
- Clade: Tracheophytes
- Clade: Angiosperms
- Clade: Eudicots
- Clade: Rosids
- Order: Myrtales
- Family: Myrtaceae
- Subfamily: Myrtoideae
- Tribe: Chamelaucieae
- Genus: Scholtzia; Schauer

Species
- See text

Synonyms
- Piptandra Turcz.

= Scholtzia =

Genus of flowering plants

Scholtzia is a genus of flowering plants in the family Myrtaceae, which are endemic to the south-west of Western Australia. The genus was first described by Schauer in 1843, who named it in honour of the physician Heinrich Scholtz. The type species is Scholtzia obovata.

Species include:

- Scholtzia capitata Benth.
- Scholtzia ciliata F.Muell.
- Scholtzia drummondii Benth.
- Scholtzia eatoniana C.A.Gardner
- Scholtzia involucrata (Endl.) Druce - Spiked scholtzia
- Scholtzia laxiflora Benth.
- Scholtzia leptantha Benth.
- Scholtzia obovata (DC.) Schauer
- Scholtzia oligandra Benth. - Pink scholtzia
- Scholtzia parviflora F.Muell.
- Scholtzia spatulata (Turcz.) Benth.
- Scholtzia teretifolia Benth.
- Scholtzia uberiflora F.Muell.
- Scholtzia umbellifera F.Muell.

== See also ==
- Rye, B.L. (2019). "An update to the taxonomy of the Western Australian genera of the Myrtaceae tribe Chamelaucieae. 6. Scholtzia" (PDF). Nuytsia. 30: 33–86. doi:10.58828/nuy00903.
