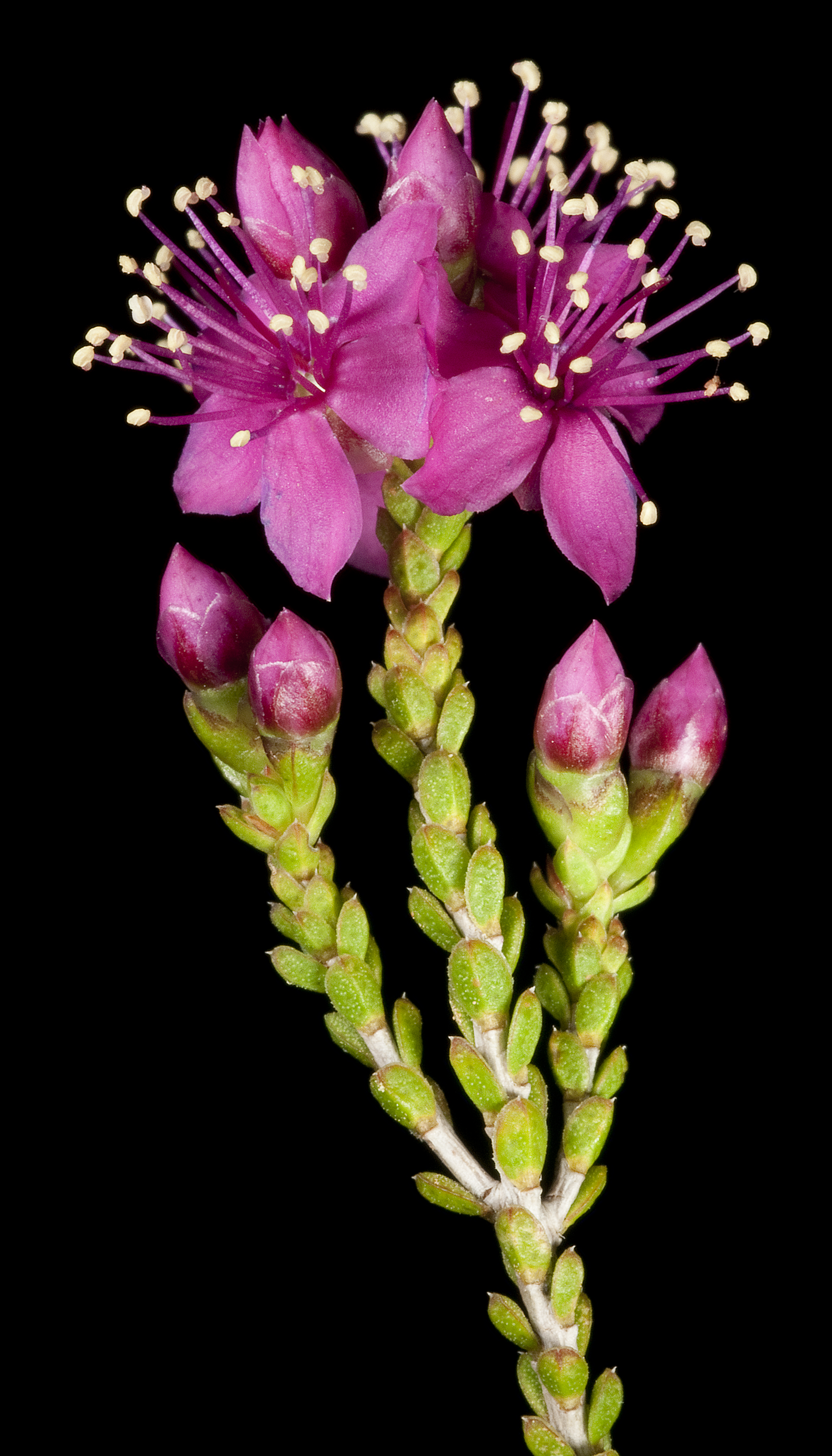
- Homalocalyx thryptomenoides

Scientific classification
- Kingdom: Plantae
- Clade: Embryophytes
- Clade: Tracheophytes
- Clade: Spermatophytes
- Clade: Angiosperms
- Clade: Eudicots
- Clade: Rosids
- Order: Myrtales
- Family: Myrtaceae
- Subfamily: Myrtoideae
- Tribe: Chamelaucieae
- Genus: Homalocalyx; F.Muell.

Synonyms
- Wehlia F.Muell.

= Homalocalyx =

Genus of flowering plants

Homalocalyx is a genus of shrubs in the family Myrtaceae described as a genus in 1857. The entire genus is endemic to Australia.

== Species ==
As of December 2025, Plants of the World Online accepts the following 11 species:

- Homalocalyx aureus - WA
- Homalocalyx chapmanii - WA
- Homalocalyx coarctatus - WA
- Homalocalyx echinulatus - WA
- Homalocalyx ericaeus - WA, NT
- Homalocalyx grandiflorus - WA
- Homalocalyx inerrabundus - WA
- Homalocalyx polyandrus - Qld
- Homalocalyx pulcherrimus - WA
- Homalocalyx staminosus - WA
- Homalocalyx thryptomenoides - WA
