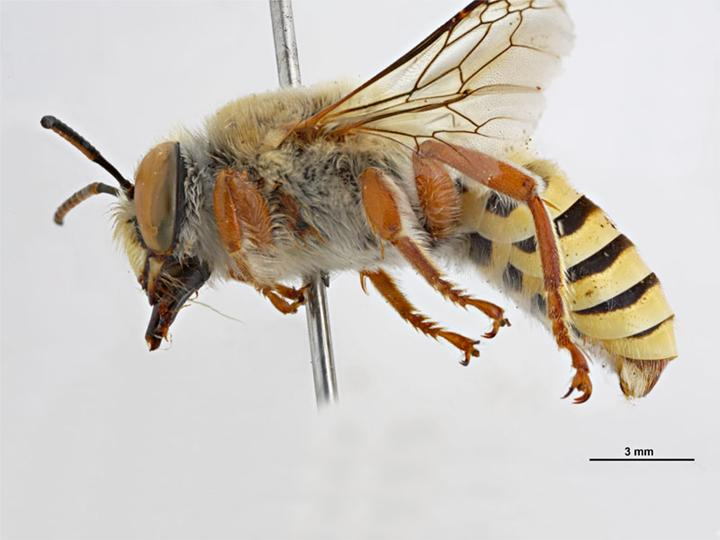
- Ctenocolletes tigris

Scientific classification
- Kingdom: Animalia
- Phylum: Arthropoda
- Class: Insecta
- Order: Hymenoptera
- Clade: Anthophila
- Family: Stenotritidae

Genera
- see text

= Stenotritidae =

Family of bees

The Stenotritidae is the smallest of all formally recognised bee families, with only 22 species in two genera, all of them restricted to Australia. Historically, they were generally considered to belong in the family Colletidae, but the stenotritids are presently considered their sister taxon, and deserving of family status. Of prime importance is that the stenotritids have unmodified mouthparts, whereas colletids are separated from all other bees by having bilobed glossae.

The American entomologist Ronald J. McGinley proposed their position as an independent family based on the morphology of the glossae in 1980. This view quickly became established.

They are large, densely hairy, fast-flying bees, which make simple burrows in the ground and firm, ovoid provision masses in cells lined with a waterproof secretion. The nests of some species can reach a depth of more than three metres. The larvae do not spin cocoons.

Fossil brood cells of a stenotritid bee have been found in the Pleistocene of the Eyre Peninsula, South Australia.

== Genera ==
The family contains two genera:

Ctenocolletes

Authority: Theodore Cockerell, 1929; selected species:

- Ctenocolletes albomarginatus (Michener, 1965)
- Ctenocolletes ordensis (Michener, 1965)
- Ctenocolletes smaragdinus (Smith, 1868)

Stenotritus

Authority: Frederick Smith, 1853; selected species:

- Stenotritus elegans (Smith, 1853)
- Stenotritus greavesi (Rayment, 1930)
- Stenotritus pubescens (Smith, 1868)
