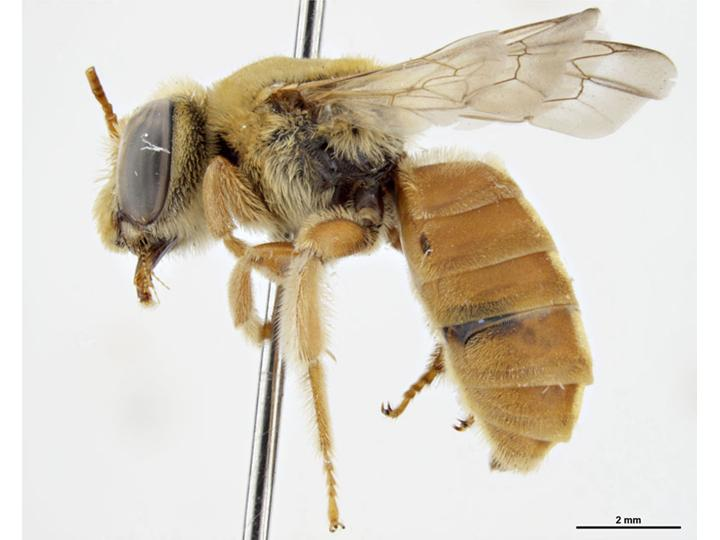
- Male

Scientific classification
- Kingdom: Animalia
- Phylum: Arthropoda
- Clade: Pancrustacea
- Class: Insecta
- Order: Hymenoptera
- Family: Colletidae
- Genus: Chrysocolletes
- Species: C. enigma

Binomial name
- Chrysocolletes enigma Maynard, 1996

= Chrysocolletes enigma =

Species of bee

Chrysocolletes enigma is a species of bee in the family Colletidae and the subfamily Colletinae. It is endemic to Australia. It was described in 1996 by entomologist Glynn Maynard.

== Etymology ==
The specific epithet enigma (from Latin aenigma: a riddle or something obscure) refers to the unknown provenance of the paratype specimen.

== Description ==
The body length of the holotype male is 11 mm. Colouration is mainly black with golden hair and an orange metasoma.

== Distribution and habitat ==
The species occurs in the tropical West Kimberley region of Western Australia. The type locality is Cape Borda to Pender on the Dampier Peninsula.

== Behaviour ==
The adults are flying mellivores.
