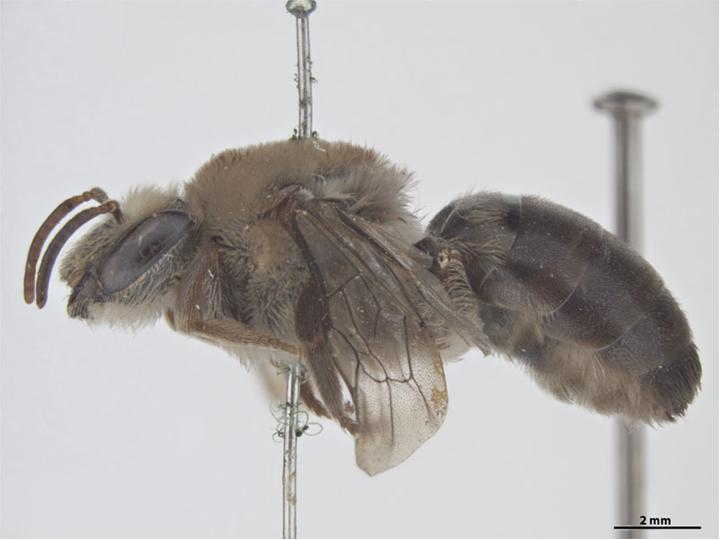
- Female

Scientific classification
- Kingdom: Animalia
- Phylum: Arthropoda
- Clade: Pancrustacea
- Class: Insecta
- Order: Hymenoptera
- Family: Colletidae
- Genus: Paracolletes
- Species: P. crassipes

Binomial name
- Paracolletes crassipes Smith, 1853

Synonyms
- Paracolletes australis Friese, 1924

= Paracolletes crassipes =

Species of bee

Paracolletes crassipes, or Paracolletes (Paracolletes) crassipes, is a species of bee in the family Colletidae and the subfamily Colletinae. It is endemic to Australia. It was described in 1853 by English entomologist Frederick Smith.

== Distribution and habitat ==
The species occurs across much of southern Australia. The type locality is Swan River, Western Australia.

== Behaviour ==
The adults are flying mellivores. Flowering plants visited by the bees include Eucalyptus and Leptospermum species.

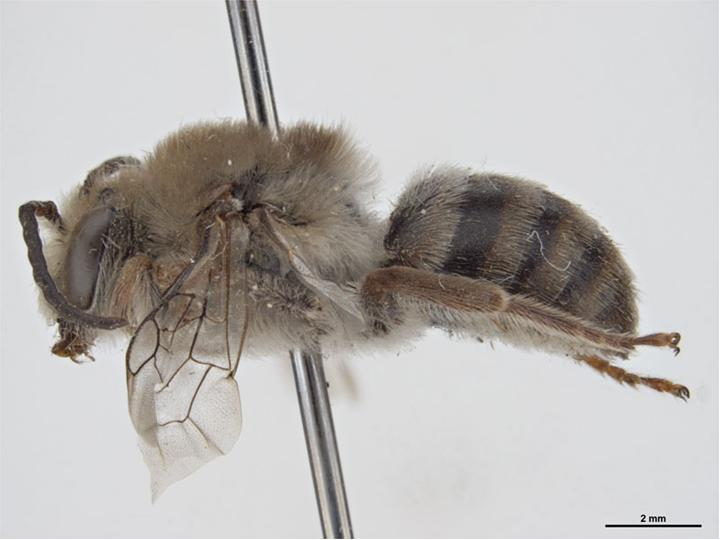
Male
