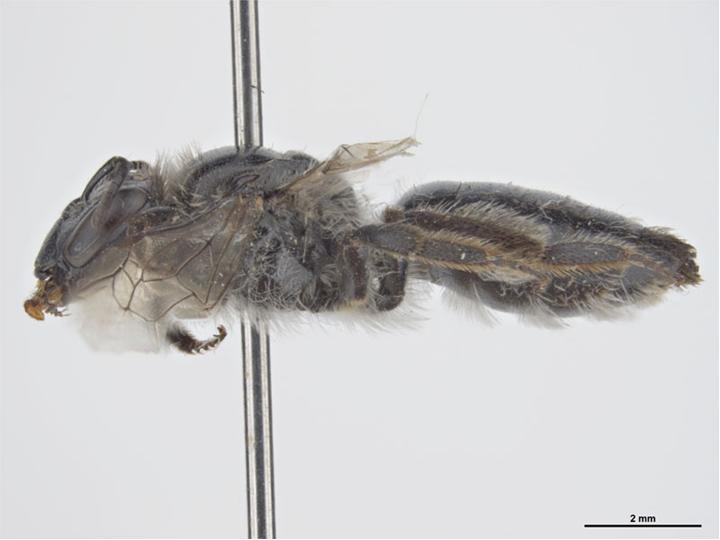
- Female
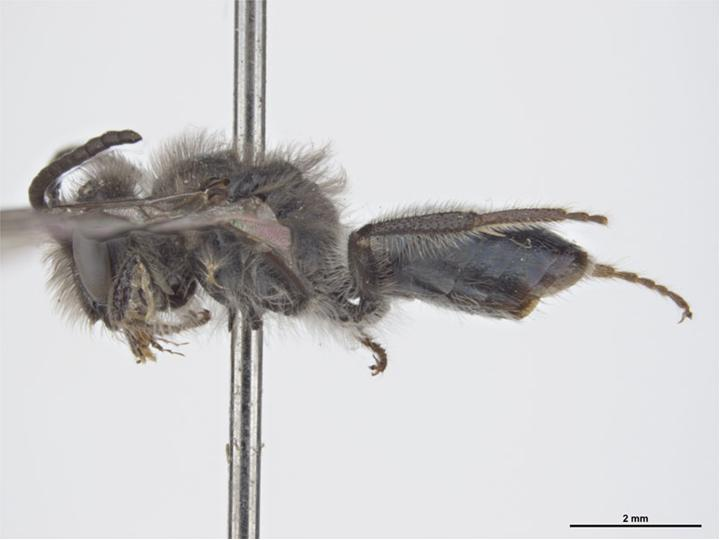
- Male

Scientific classification
- Kingdom: Animalia
- Phylum: Arthropoda
- Clade: Pancrustacea
- Class: Insecta
- Order: Hymenoptera
- Family: Colletidae
- Genus: Leioproctus
- Species: L. providus

Binomial name
- Leioproctus providus (Smith, 1879)

Synonyms
- Lamprocolletes providus Smith, 1879; Paracolletes viridicinctus Cockerell, 1905; Paracolletes helmsi Cockerell, 1929

= Leioproctus providus =

Species of bee

Leioproctus providus, or Leioproctus (Leioproctus) providus, is a species of bee in the family Colletidae and subfamily Colletinae. It is endemic to Australia. It was described by English entomologist Frederick Smith in 1879.

== Distribution and habitat ==
The species occurs in both eastern and south-western Australia. Type localities include Mount Kosciuszko, at an elevation of 5,000 ft (1,500 m).

== Behaviour ==
The adults are flying mellivores. Flowering plants visited by the bees include Eucalyptus species.
