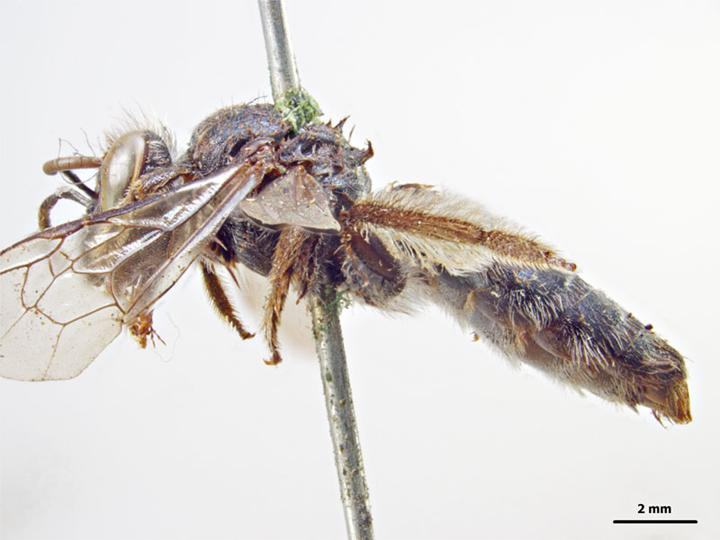
- Female

Scientific classification
- Kingdom: Animalia
- Phylum: Arthropoda
- Clade: Pancrustacea
- Class: Insecta
- Order: Hymenoptera
- Family: Colletidae
- Genus: Leioproctus
- Species: L. fulvus

Binomial name
- Leioproctus fulvus (Smith, 1879)

Synonyms
- Lamprocolletes fulvus Smith, 1879; Paracolletes megachalceus Cockerell, 1913

= Leioproctus fulvus =

Species of bee

Leioproctus fulvus, or Leioproctus (Hadrocolletes) fulvus, is a species of bee in the family Colletidae and subfamily Colletinae. It is endemic to Australia. It was described by English entomologist Frederick Smith in 1879.

== Distribution and habitat ==
The species occurs in eastern mainland Australia. Type localities include Clarence River in New South Wales.

== Behaviour ==
The adults are solitary flying mellivores that nest gregariously in the ground.

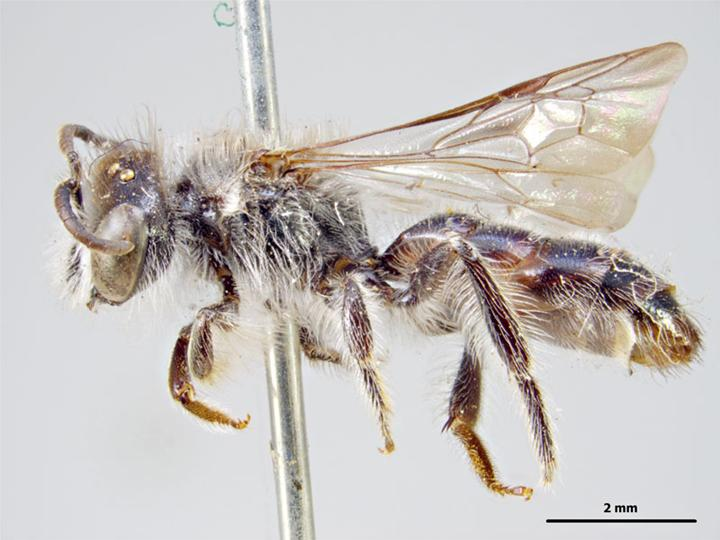
Male
