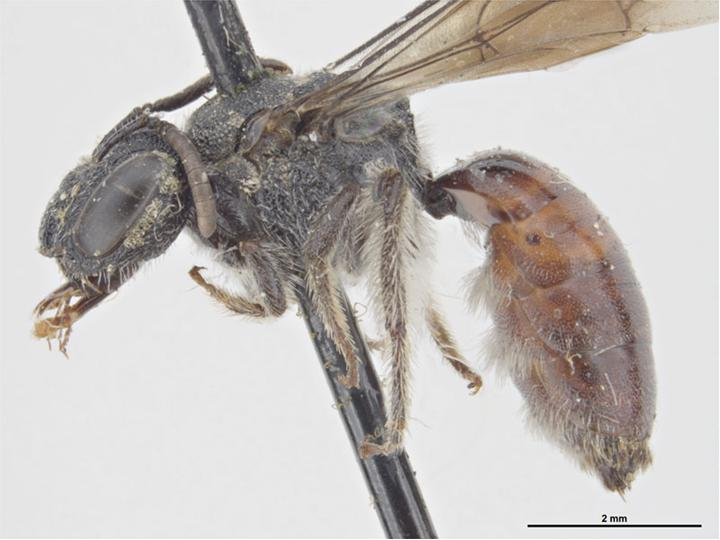
- Female

Scientific classification
- Kingdom: Animalia
- Phylum: Arthropoda
- Clade: Pancrustacea
- Class: Insecta
- Order: Hymenoptera
- Family: Colletidae
- Genus: Callomelitta
- Species: C. antipodes

Binomial name
- Callomelitta antipodes (Smith, 1853)

Synonyms
- Sphecodes antipodes Smith, 1853; Sphecodes antipus Sichel, 1865

= Callomelitta antipodes =

Species of bee

Callomelitta antipodes is a species of bee in the family Colletidae and the subfamily Colletinae. It is endemic to Australia. It was described in 1853 by English entomologist Frederick Smith.

== Distribution and habitat ==
The species occurs across much of Australia. The type locality is Sydney in New South Wales.

== Behaviour ==
The adults are solitary flying mellivores that nest in rotting wood. Flowering plants visited by the bees include Bursaria and Leptospermum species.

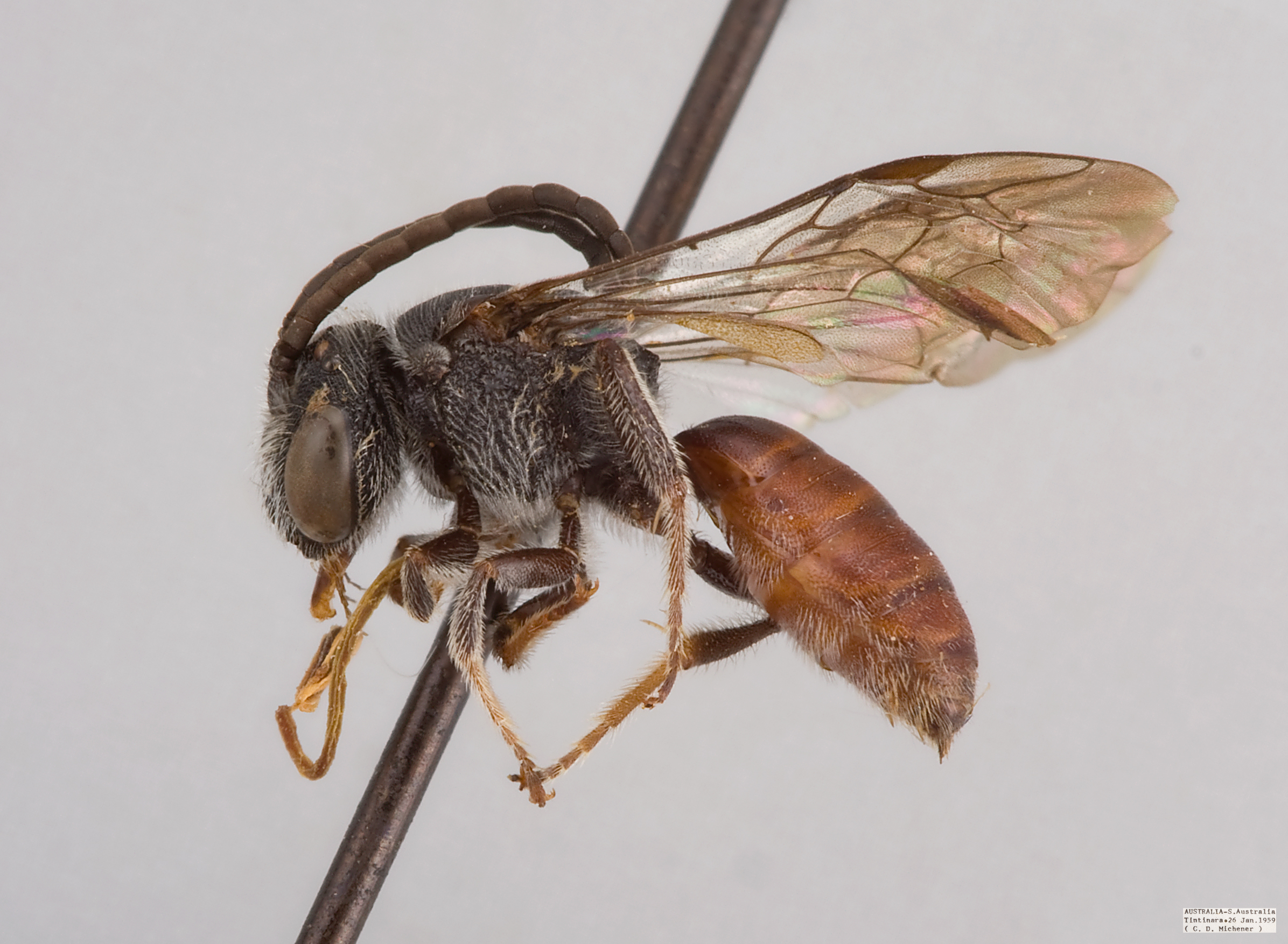
Male
