= Paracolletes brevicornis =

Scientific classification
- Kingdom: Animalia
- Phylum: Arthropoda
- Clade: Pancrustacea
- Class: Insecta
- Order: Hymenoptera
- Family: Colletidae
- Genus: Paracolletes
- Species: P. brevicornis

Binomial name
- Paracolletes brevicornis (Smith, 1854)

Synonyms
- Tetralonia brevicornis Smith, 1854

Species of bee

Paracolletes brevicornis, or Paracolletes (Paracolletes) brevicornis, is a species of bee in the family Colletidae and the subfamily Colletinae. It is endemic to Australia. It was described in 1854 by English entomologist Frederick Smith.

== Distribution and habitat ==
The species occurs in eastern Australia. The type locality is Moreton Bay, Queensland.

== Behaviour ==
The adults are flying mellivores.
