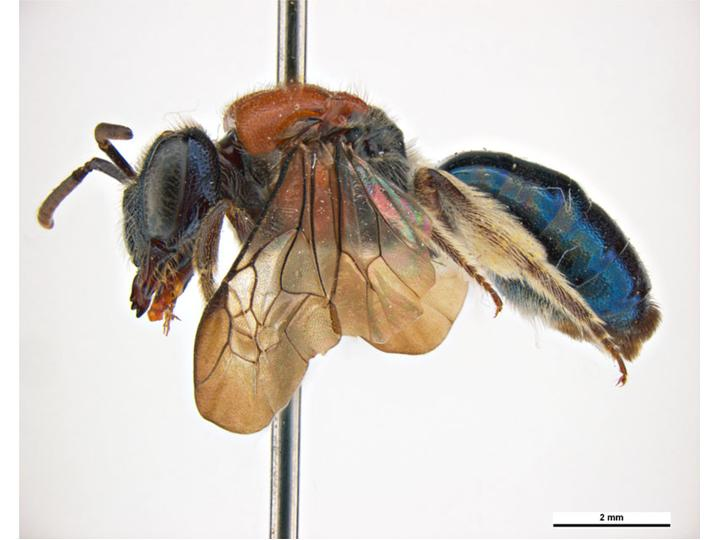
- Female

Scientific classification
- Kingdom: Animalia
- Phylum: Arthropoda
- Clade: Pancrustacea
- Class: Insecta
- Order: Hymenoptera
- Family: Colletidae
- Genus: Callomelitta
- Species: C. picta

Binomial name
- Callomelitta picta Smith, 1853

= Callomelitta picta =

Species of bee

Callomelitta picta is a species of bee in the family Colletidae and the subfamily Colletinae. It is endemic to Australia. It was described in 1853 by English entomologist Frederick Smith.

== Distribution and habitat ==
The species occurs in south-eastern Australia. The type locality is Tasmania.

== Behaviour ==
The adults are solitary flying mellivores that nest in rotting wood. Flowering plants visited by the bees include Callistemon, Eucalyptus, Leptospermum, Lomatia and Prostanthera species.

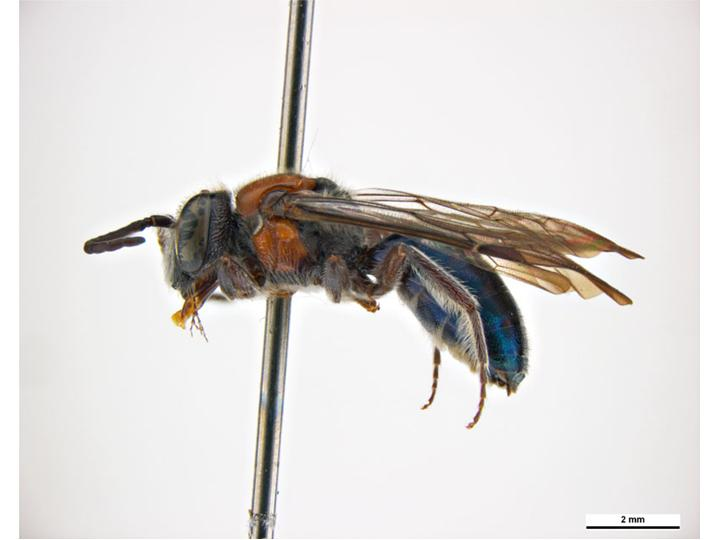
Male
