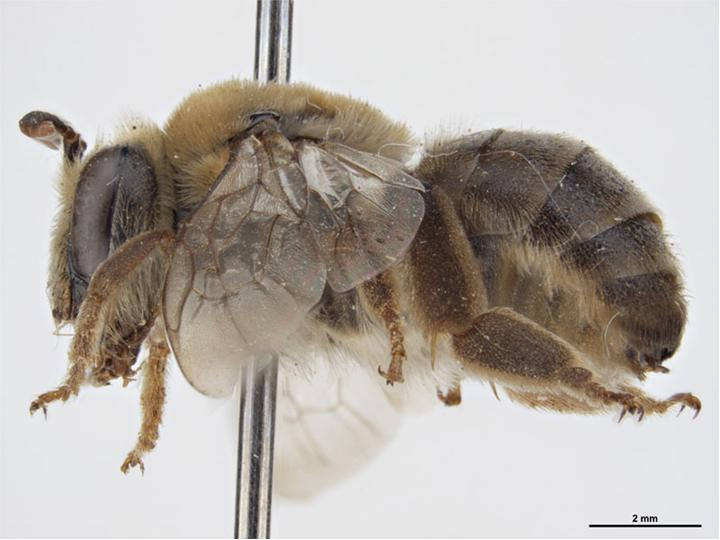
- Female

Scientific classification
- Kingdom: Animalia
- Phylum: Arthropoda
- Clade: Pancrustacea
- Class: Insecta
- Order: Hymenoptera
- Family: Colletidae
- Genus: Paracolletes
- Species: P. fervidus

Binomial name
- Paracolletes fervidus Smith, 1879

= Paracolletes fervidus =

Species of bee

Paracolletes fervidus, or Paracolletes (Paracolletes) fervidus, is a species of bee in the family Colletidae and the subfamily Colletinae. It is endemic to Australia. It was described in 1879 by English entomologist Frederick Smith.

== Distribution and habitat ==
The species occurs in south-eastern Australia. The type locality was originally recorded simply as 'New Holland', without further precision, but the species has since been reported from Tooradin, Victoria.

== Behaviour ==
The adults are flying mellivores.
