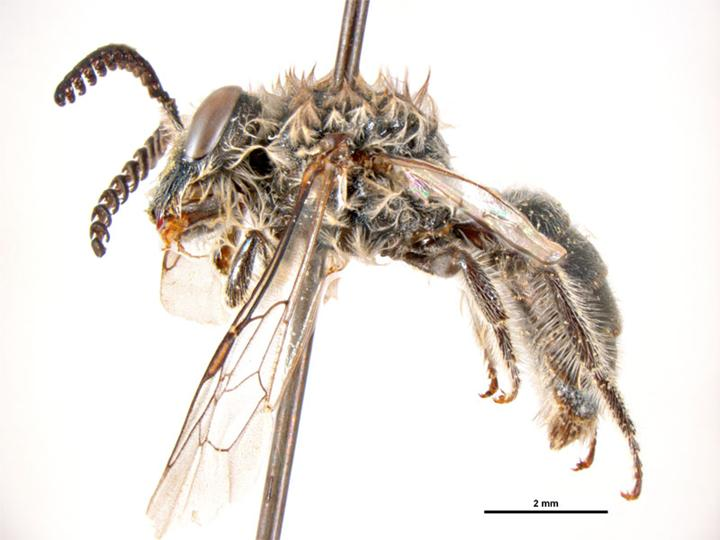
- Male

Scientific classification
- Kingdom: Animalia
- Phylum: Arthropoda
- Clade: Pancrustacea
- Class: Insecta
- Order: Hymenoptera
- Family: Colletidae
- Genus: Leioproctus
- Species: L. bipectinatus

Binomial name
- Leioproctus bipectinatus (Smith, 1857)

Synonyms
- Lamprocolletes bipectinatus Smith, 1857; Lamprocolletes cladocerus Smith, 1862

= Leioproctus bipectinatus =

Species of bee

Leioproctus bipectinatus, or Leioproctus (Cladocerapis) bipectinatus, is a species of bee in the family Colletidae and subfamily Colletinae. It is endemic to Australia. It was described by English entomologist Frederick Smith in 1857.

== Distribution and habitat ==
The species occurs in eastern Australia. Type localities include Sydney and "between Sydney and Moreton Bay".

== Behaviour ==
The adults are solitary flying mellivores which nest in the ground. Flowering plants visited by the bees include Persoonia species.
