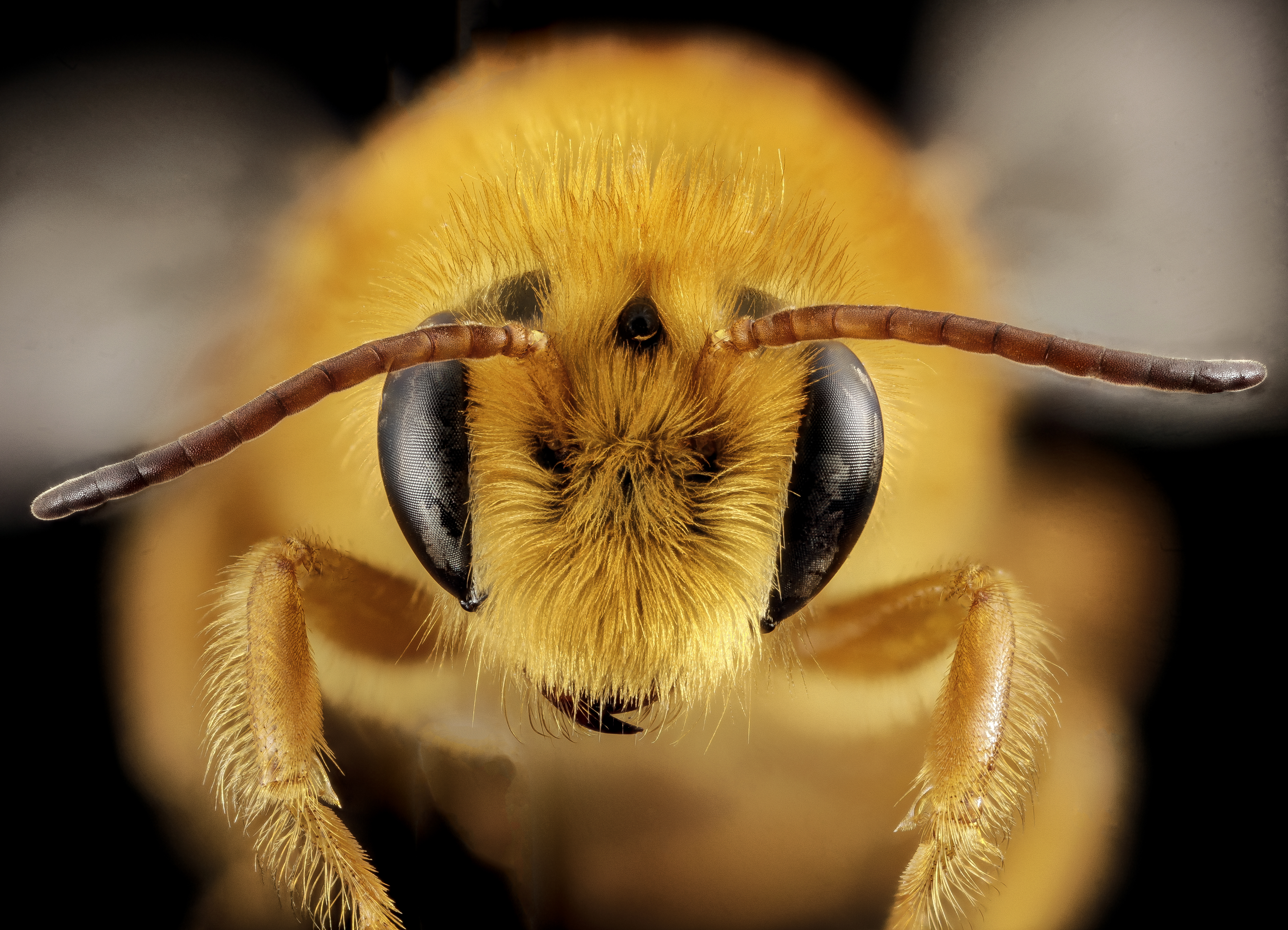
- Paracolletes sp.

Scientific classification
- Kingdom: Animalia
- Phylum: Arthropoda
- Clade: Pancrustacea
- Class: Insecta
- Order: Hymenoptera
- Infraorder: Aculeata
- Superfamily: Apoidea
- Clade: Anthophila
- Family: Colletidae
- Genus: Paracolletes; Smith, 1853

= Paracolletes =

Genus of bees

Paracolletes is a genus of bees in the family Colletidae and the subfamily Colletinae. It is endemic to Australia. It was described in 1853 by English entomologist Frederick Smith.

== Species ==
As of 2026 the genus contained eight valid species:

- Paracolletes brevicornis (Smith, 1854)
- Paracolletes convictus (Cockerell, 1909)
- Paracolletes crassipes Smith, 1853
- Paracolletes fervidus Smith, 1879
- Paracolletes leptospermi Cockerell, 1912
- Paracolletes rebellis Cockerell, 1912
- Paracolletes subfuscus Cockerell, 1906
- Paracolletes submacrodontus Rayment, 1934
