= Callomelitta perpicta =

Scientific classification
- Kingdom: Animalia
- Phylum: Arthropoda
- Clade: Pancrustacea
- Class: Insecta
- Order: Hymenoptera
- Family: Colletidae
- Genus: Callomelitta
- Species: C. perpicta

Binomial name
- Callomelitta perpicta Cockerell, 1910

Synonyms
- Callomelitta picta perpicta Cockerell, 1910; Callomelitta cyanescens Friese, 1924

Species of bee

Callomelitta perpicta is a species of bee in the family Colletidae and the subfamily Colletinae. It is endemic to Australia. It was described in 1910 by British-American entomologist Theodore Dru Alison Cockerell.

== Distribution and habitat ==
The species occurs in south-eastern Australia. The type locality is Ararat, Victoria.

== Behaviour ==
The adults are solitary flying mellivores that nest in rotting wood. Flowering plants visited by the bees include Acacia and Eucalyptus species.
