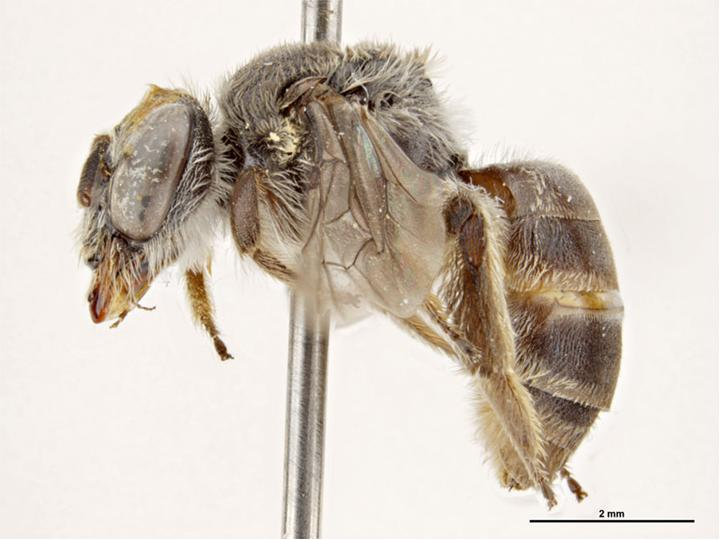
- Female

Scientific classification
- Kingdom: Animalia
- Phylum: Arthropoda
- Clade: Pancrustacea
- Class: Insecta
- Order: Hymenoptera
- Family: Colletidae
- Genus: Glossurocolletes
- Species: G. xenoceratus

Binomial name
- Glossurocolletes xenoceratus (Michener, 1965)

Synonyms
- Leioproctus (Glossurocolletes) xenoceratus Michener, 1965

= Glossurocolletes xenoceratus =

Species of bee

Glossurocolletes xenoceratus is a species of bee in the family Colletidae and the subfamily Colletinae. It is endemic to Australia. It was described in 1965 by American entomologist Charles Duncan Michener.

== Distribution and habitat ==
The species occurs in Western Australia. The type locality is Capel in the South West region.

== Behaviour ==
The adults are flying mellivores.

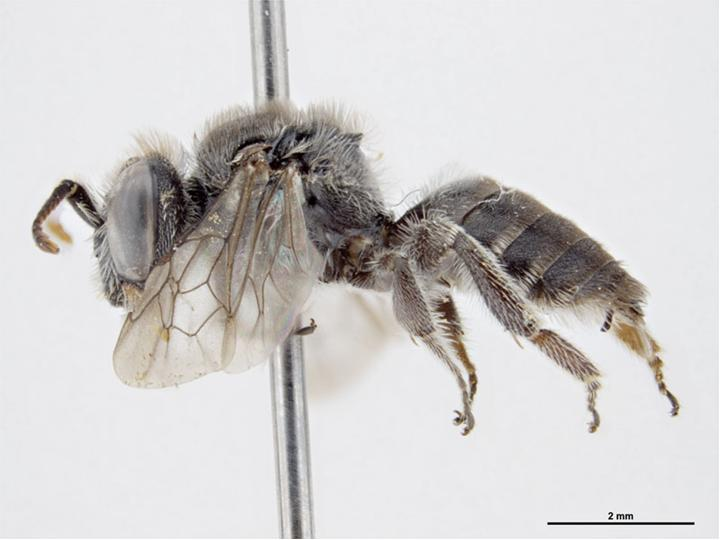
Male
