= Lasioglossum sulthicum =

Scientific classification
- Kingdom: Animalia
- Phylum: Arthropoda
- Clade: Pancrustacea
- Class: Insecta
- Order: Hymenoptera
- Family: Halictidae
- Genus: Lasioglossum
- Species: L. sulthicum

Binomial name
- Lasioglossum sulthicum Smith, 1853

Species of bee

Lasioglossum sulthicum is a species of Hymenoptera from the Halictidae family. The scientific name of this species was first published in 1853 by Frederick Smith. This species can be found in Eastern Australia and also in New Caledonia.
