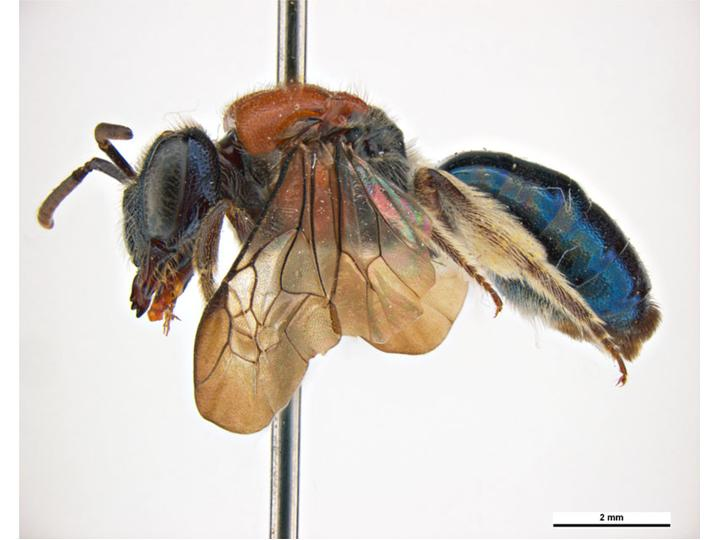
- Callomelitta picta, female

Scientific classification
- Kingdom: Animalia
- Phylum: Arthropoda
- Clade: Pancrustacea
- Class: Insecta
- Order: Hymenoptera
- Superfamily: Apoidea
- Clade: Anthophila
- Family: Colletidae
- Subfamily: Colletinae
- Genus: Callomelitta; Smith, 1853

Synonyms
- Binghamiella Cockerell, 1907; Pachyodonta Rayment, 1954

= Callomelitta =

Genus of bees

Callomelitta is a genus of bees in the family Colletidae and the subfamily Colletinae. It is endemic to Australia. It was described in 1853 by English entomologist Frederick Smith.

== Species ==
As of 2026 the genus contained 11 valid species:

- Callomelitta antipodes (Smith, 1853)
- Callomelitta chlorura (Cockerell, 1929
- Callomelitta fulvicornis (Rayment, 1954)
- Callomelitta insularis (Cockerell, 1914)
- Callomelitta littleri Cockerell, 1914
- Callomelitta nigra (Rayment, 1929)
- Callomelitta perpicta Cockerell, 1910
- Callomelitta picta Smith, 1853
- Callomelitta rugosa Cockerell, 1915
- Callomelitta turnerorum Cockerell, 1910
- Callomelitta wilsoni Cockerell, 1929
