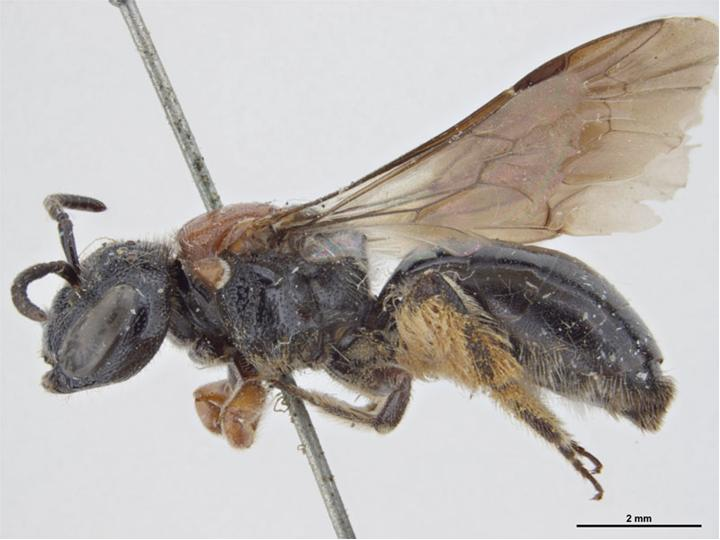
- Female

Scientific classification
- Kingdom: Animalia
- Phylum: Arthropoda
- Clade: Pancrustacea
- Class: Insecta
- Order: Hymenoptera
- Family: Colletidae
- Genus: Callomelitta
- Species: C. littleri

Binomial name
- Callomelitta littleri Cockerell, 1914

Synonyms
- Callomelitta nigrofasciata Cockerell, 1918; Callomelitta nigriventris Friese, 1924

= Callomelitta littleri =

Species of bee

Callomelitta littleri is a species of bee in the family Colletidae and the subfamily Colletinae. It is endemic to Australia. It was described in 1914 by British-American entomologist Theodore Dru Alison Cockerell.

== Description ==
The body length of the female holotype is 9 mm, wing length 7.5 mm. Colouring is mainly red and black.

== Distribution and habitat ==
The species occurs in south-eastern Australia. The type locality is Launceston, Tasmania.

== Behaviour ==
The adults are solitary flying mellivores which nest in rotting wood.

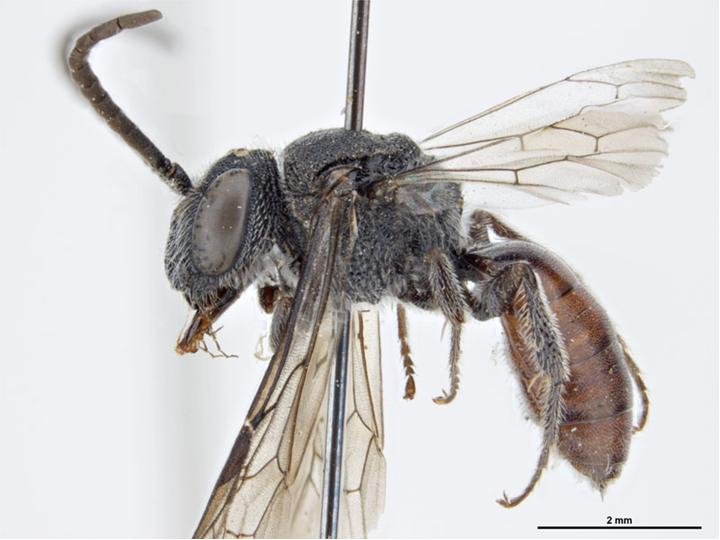
Male
