= Megachile similis =

Scientific classification
- Domain: Eukaryota
- Kingdom: Animalia
- Phylum: Arthropoda
- Class: Insecta
- Order: Hymenoptera
- Family: Megachilidae
- Genus: Megachile
- Species: M. similis

Binomial name
- Megachile similis Smith, 1879

Species of leafcutter bee (Megachile)

Megachile similis is a species of bee in the family Megachilidae. It was described by Frederick Smith in 1879.
