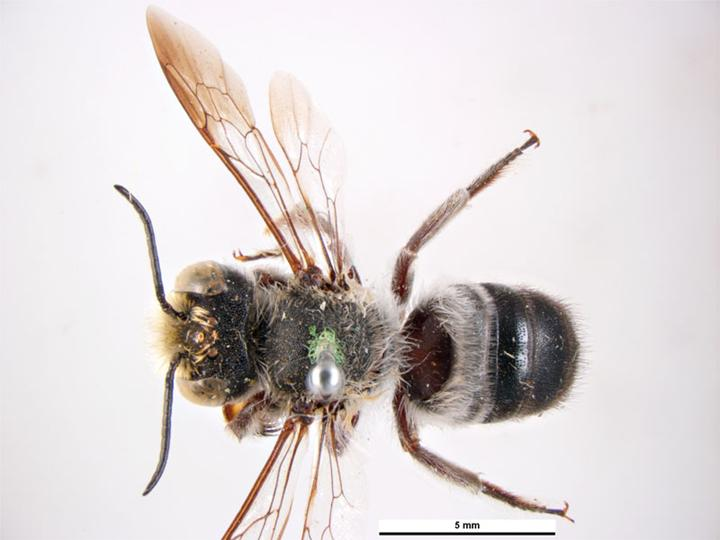
- Megachile aethiops female

Scientific classification
- Kingdom: Animalia
- Phylum: Arthropoda
- Class: Insecta
- Order: Hymenoptera
- Family: Megachilidae
- Genus: Megachile
- Species: M. aethiops

Binomial name
- Megachile aethiops Smith, 1853

= Megachile aethiops =

Species of leafcutter bee (Megachile)

Megachile aethiops is a species of bee in the family Megachilidae. It was described by Frederick Smith in 1853. The species is known only from Australia.
