= Chrysocolletes aureus =

Scientific classification
- Kingdom: Animalia
- Phylum: Arthropoda
- Clade: Pancrustacea
- Class: Insecta
- Order: Hymenoptera
- Family: Colletidae
- Genus: Chrysocolletes
- Species: C. aureus

Binomial name
- Chrysocolletes aureus Leijs & Hogendoorn, 2021

Species of bee

Chrysocolletes aureus is a species of bee in the family Colletidae and the subfamily Colletinae. It is endemic to Australia. It was described in 2021 by entomologists Remko Leijs and Katja Hogendoorn.

== Distribution and habitat ==
The species occurs in Far North Queensland. The type locality is the Laura Roadhouse on the Cape York Peninsula.
