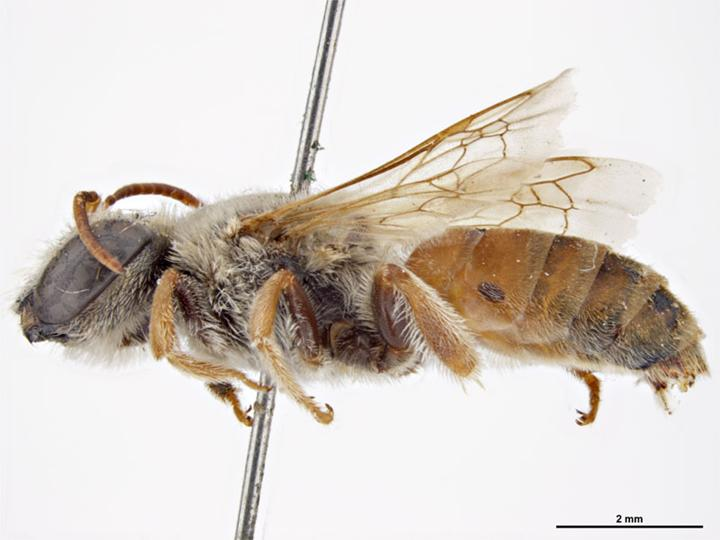
- Male

Scientific classification
- Kingdom: Animalia
- Phylum: Arthropoda
- Clade: Pancrustacea
- Class: Insecta
- Order: Hymenoptera
- Family: Colletidae
- Genus: Chrysocolletes
- Species: C. pilosus

Binomial name
- Chrysocolletes pilosus Maynard, 1996

= Chrysocolletes pilosus =

Species of bee

Chrysocolletes pilosus is a species of bee in the family Colletidae and the subfamily Colletinae. It is endemic to Australia. It was described in 1996 by entomologist Glynn Maynard.

== Etymology ==
The specific epithet pilosus (Greek for 'velvet-like hair') refers to the hair of the mesosoma and metasoma.

== Description ==
The body length of the holotype male is 9 mm. Colouration is mainly black, with an orange metasoma, and with white and golden hair.

== Distribution and habitat ==
The species occurs in the tropical Top End of the Northern Territory. The type locality is Brock Creek, Burnside, near Litchfield National Park.

== Behaviour ==
The adults are flying mellivores.
