= Callomelitta rugosa =

Scientific classification
- Kingdom: Animalia
- Phylum: Arthropoda
- Clade: Pancrustacea
- Class: Insecta
- Order: Hymenoptera
- Family: Colletidae
- Genus: Callomelitta
- Species: C. rugosa

Binomial name
- Callomelitta rugosa Cockerell, 1915

Species of bee

Callomelitta rugosa is a species of bee in the family Colletidae and the subfamily Colletinae. It is endemic to Australia. It was described in 1915 by British-American entomologist Theodore Dru Alison Cockerell.

== Description ==
The body length of the female holotype is 8 mm. Colouring is mainly black and red.

== Distribution and habitat ==
The species occurs in eastern Australia. The type locality is Queensland, exact location unknown.

== Behaviour ==
The adults are flying mellivores.
