= Callomelitta insularis =

Scientific classification
- Kingdom: Animalia
- Phylum: Arthropoda
- Clade: Pancrustacea
- Class: Insecta
- Order: Hymenoptera
- Family: Colletidae
- Genus: Callomelitta
- Species: C. insularis

Binomial name
- Callomelitta insularis (Cockerell, 1914)

Synonyms
- Binghamiella insularis Cockerell, 1914

Species of bee

Callomelitta insularis is a species of bee in the family Colletidae and the subfamily Colletinae. It is endemic to Australia. It was described in 1914 by British-American entomologist Theodore Dru Alison Cockerell.

== Description ==
The body length of the male holotype is 7 mm. Colouring is mainly black and red.

== Distribution and habitat ==
The species occurs in south-eastern Australia. The type locality is Eaglehawk Neck, Tasmania. It has also been recorded from Victoria.

== Behaviour ==
The adults are solitary flying mellivores which nest in rotting wood. Flowering plants visited by the bees include Eucalyptus, Banksia, Dahlia, Leucopogon and Melaleuca species.
