= Hylaeus bidentatus =

Scientific classification
- Kingdom: Animalia
- Phylum: Arthropoda
- Clade: Pancrustacea
- Class: Insecta
- Order: Hymenoptera
- Family: Colletidae
- Genus: Hylaeus
- Species: H. bidentatus

Binomial name
- Hylaeus bidentatus (Smith, 1853)

Synonyms
- Prosopis bidentata Smith, 1853

Species of bee

Hylaeus bidentatus, or Hylaeus (Prosopisteron) bidentatus, is a species of bee in the family Colletidae and subfamily Hylaeinae. It is endemic to Australia. It was described by English entomologist Frederick Smith in 1853.

== Distribution and habitat ==
The species occurs in eastern Australia. The type locality is simply "New Holland". It has been recorded from Stradbroke Island and near Noosa in south-east Queensland.

== Behaviour ==
The adults are flying mellivores. Flowering plants visited by the bees include Banksia species.
