= Callomelitta chlorura =

Scientific classification
- Kingdom: Animalia
- Phylum: Arthropoda
- Clade: Pancrustacea
- Class: Insecta
- Order: Hymenoptera
- Family: Colletidae
- Genus: Callomelitta
- Species: C. chlorura

Binomial name
- Callomelitta chlorura Cockerell, 1929

Species of bee

Callomelitta chlorura is a species of bee in the family Colletidae and the subfamily Colletinae. It is endemic to Australia. It was described in 1929 by British-American entomologist Theodore Dru Alison Cockerell.

== Distribution and habitat ==
The species occurs in South Australia. The type locality is Adelaide.

== Behaviour ==
The adults are solitary flying mellivores that nest in rotting wood.
