= Callomelitta fulvicornis =

Scientific classification
- Kingdom: Animalia
- Phylum: Arthropoda
- Clade: Pancrustacea
- Class: Insecta
- Order: Hymenoptera
- Family: Colletidae
- Genus: Callomelitta
- Species: C. fulvicornis

Binomial name
- Callomelitta fulvicornis (Rayment, 1954)

Synonyms
- Binghamiella (Pachyodonta) fulvicornis Rayment, 1954

Species of bee

Callomelitta fulvicornis is a species of bee in the family Colletidae and the subfamily Colletinae. It is endemic to Australia. It was described in 1954 by Australian entomologist Tarlton Rayment.

== Distribution and habitat ==
The species occurs in eastern Australia. The type locality is Jamberoo, on the South Coast of New South Wales.

== Behaviour ==
The adults are flying mellivores that nest in rotting wood. Flowering plants visited by the bees include Prostanthera species.
