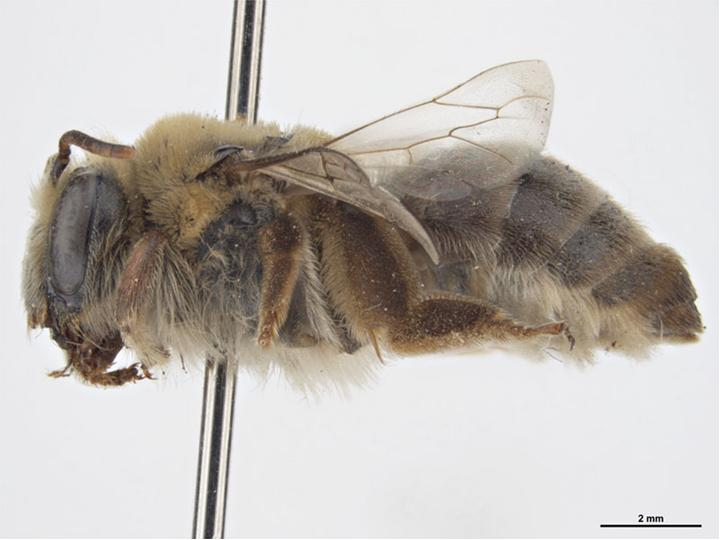
- Female

Scientific classification
- Kingdom: Animalia
- Phylum: Arthropoda
- Clade: Pancrustacea
- Class: Insecta
- Order: Hymenoptera
- Family: Colletidae
- Genus: Paracolletes
- Species: P. rebellis

Binomial name
- Paracolletes rebellis Cockerell, 1912

= Paracolletes rebellis =

Species of bee

Paracolletes rebellis, or Paracolletes (Paracolletes) rebellis, is a species of bee in the family Colletidae and the subfamily Colletinae. It is endemic to Australia. It was described in 1912 by British-American entomologist Theodore Dru Alison Cockerell.

== Description ==
Body length of the male holotype is 13 mm. Colouration is mainly black with ferruginous markings and hair.

== Distribution and habitat ==
The species occurs in south-eastern Australia. The type locality is Melbourne, Victoria.

== Behaviour ==
The adults are flying mellivores.

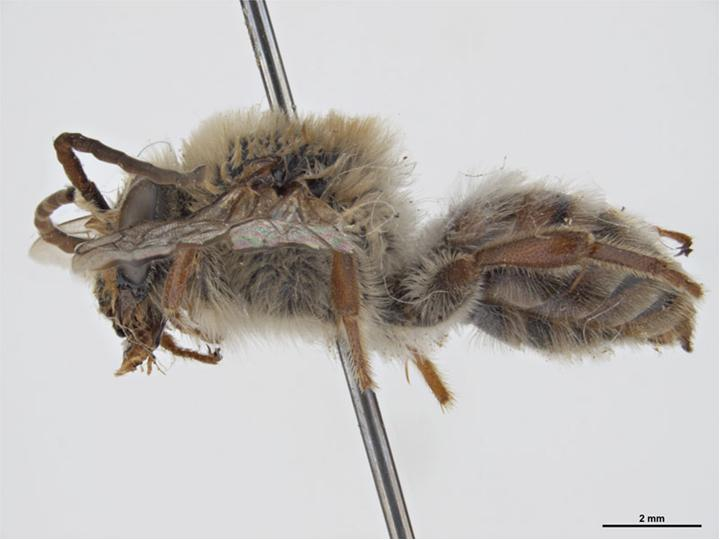
Male
