= Callomelitta turnerorum =

Scientific classification
- Kingdom: Animalia
- Phylum: Arthropoda
- Clade: Pancrustacea
- Class: Insecta
- Order: Hymenoptera
- Family: Colletidae
- Genus: Callomelitta
- Species: C. turnerorum

Binomial name
- Callomelitta turnerorum Cockerell, 1910

Species of bee

Callomelitta turnerorum is a species of bee in the family Colletidae and the subfamily Colletinae. It is endemic to Australia. It was described in 1910 by British-American entomologist Theodore Dru Alison Cockerell.

== Description ==
The body length of the female holotype is 7.5 mm. Cockerell describes the colouration as: "Thorax, legs, and abdomen entirely bright rufo-fulvous; head black, with the lower margin of clypeus, labrum, and the bidentate mandibles ferruginous…", and adds that it is: "A very distinct species, easily known by its peculiar colour."

== Distribution and habitat ==
The species occurs in Far North Queensland. The type locality is Kuranda.

== Behaviour ==
The adults are flying mellivores.
