= Callomelitta nigra =

Scientific classification
- Kingdom: Animalia
- Phylum: Arthropoda
- Clade: Pancrustacea
- Class: Insecta
- Order: Hymenoptera
- Family: Colletidae
- Genus: Callomelitta
- Species: C. nigra

Binomial name
- Callomelitta nigra (Rayment, 1929)

Synonyms
- Binghamiella antipodes nigra Rayment, 1929

Species of bee

Callomelitta nigra is a species of bee in the family Colletidae and the subfamily Colletinae. It is endemic to Australia. It was described in 1929 by Australian entomologist Tarlton Rayment.

== Distribution and habitat ==
The species occurs in south-eastern Australia. The type locality is Cann River, Victoria.

== Behaviour ==
The adults are solitary flying mellivores that nest in rotting wood. Flowering plants visited by the bees include Leptospermum species.
