= Paracolletes leptospermi =

Scientific classification
- Kingdom: Animalia
- Phylum: Arthropoda
- Clade: Pancrustacea
- Class: Insecta
- Order: Hymenoptera
- Family: Colletidae
- Genus: Paracolletes
- Species: P. leptospermi

Binomial name
- Paracolletes leptospermi Cockerell, 1912

Species of bee

Paracolletes leptospermi, or Paracolletes (Paracolletes) leptospermi, is a species of bee in the family Colletidae and the subfamily Colletinae. It is endemic to Australia. It was described in 1912 by British-American entomologist Theodore Dru Alison Cockerell.

== Description ==
Body length of the male holotype is 12 mm. Colouration is mainly black with ferruginous and greenish markings, and white to yellowish-white hair.

== Distribution and habitat ==
The species occurs in eastern Australia. The type locality is Mackay, Queensland.

== Behaviour ==
The adults are flying mellivores.
