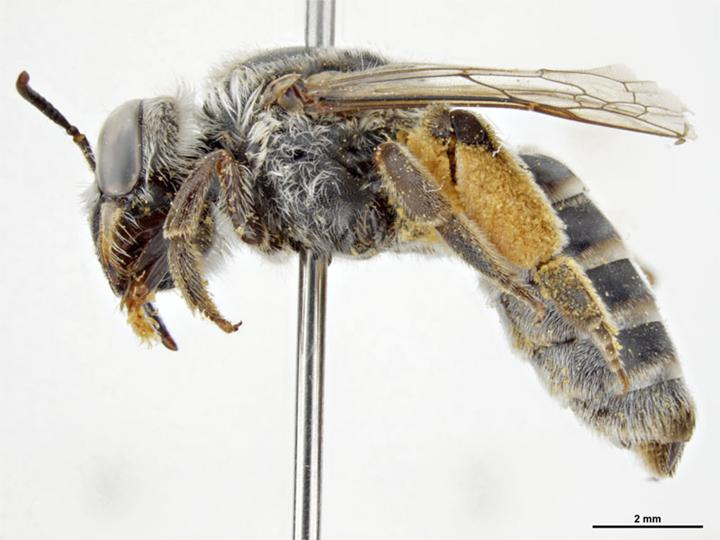
- Female

Scientific classification
- Kingdom: Animalia
- Phylum: Arthropoda
- Clade: Pancrustacea
- Class: Insecta
- Order: Hymenoptera
- Family: Colletidae
- Genus: Chrysocolletes
- Species: C. strangomeles

Binomial name
- Chrysocolletes strangomeles Maynard, 1996

= Chrysocolletes strangomeles =

Species of bee

Chrysocolletes strangomeles is a species of bee in the family Colletidae and the subfamily Colletinae. It is endemic to Australia. It was described in 1996 by entomologist Glynn Maynard.

== Etymology ==
The specific epithet strangomeles is derived from Greek strangos ('twisted' or 'crooked') and melos ('limb'), referring to the highly modified hind legs of the males.

== Description ==
The body length of females is about 12 mm, that of males 13 mm. Colouration is mainly black, yellow and brown, with yellow hair.

== Distribution and habitat ==
The species occurs in central Australia. The type locality is 56 km south-east of Alice Springs.

== Behaviour ==
The adults are flying mellivores. Flowering plants visited by the bees include Scaevola depauperata.

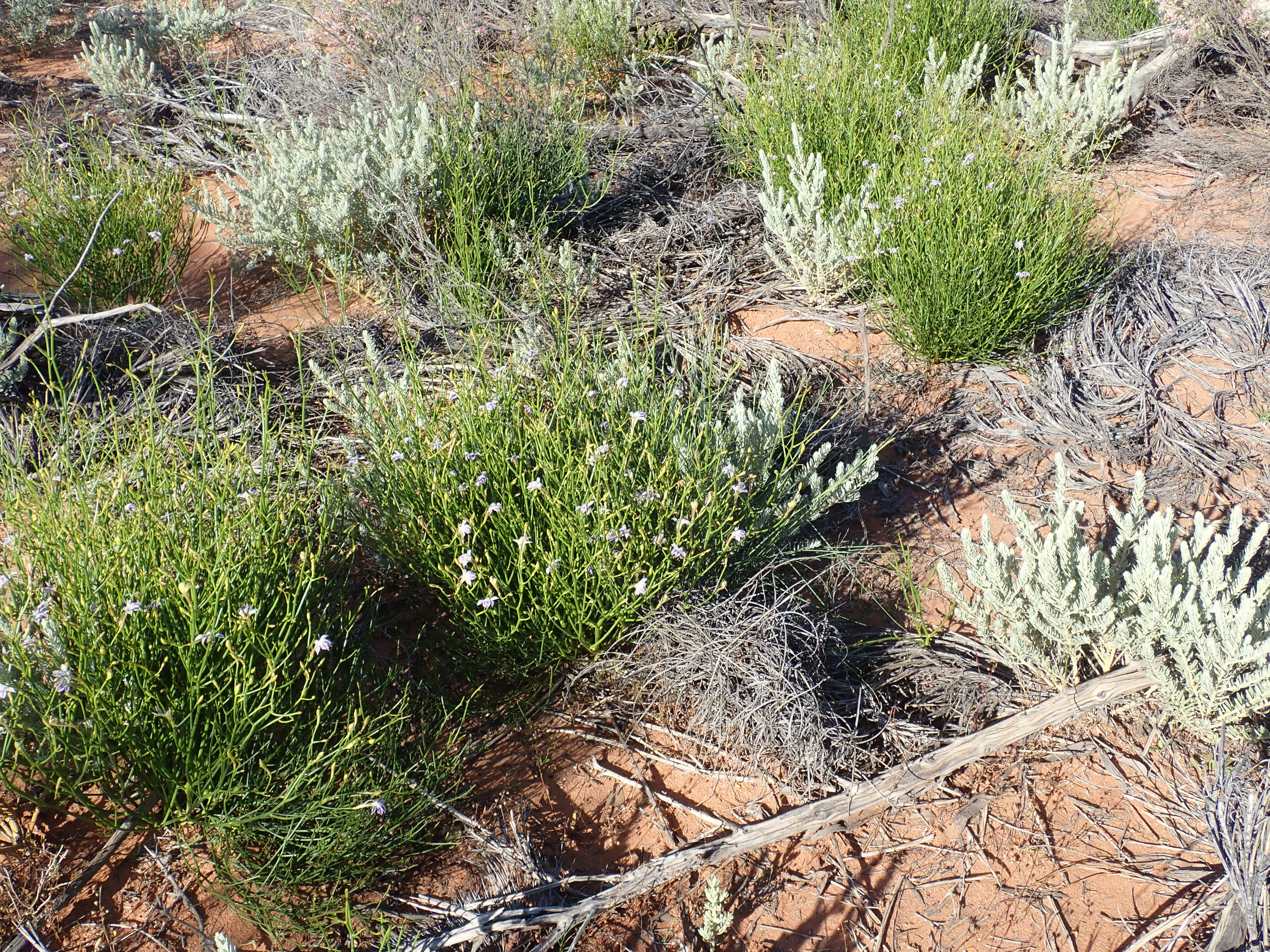
Scaevola depauperata, a forage plant of the bees

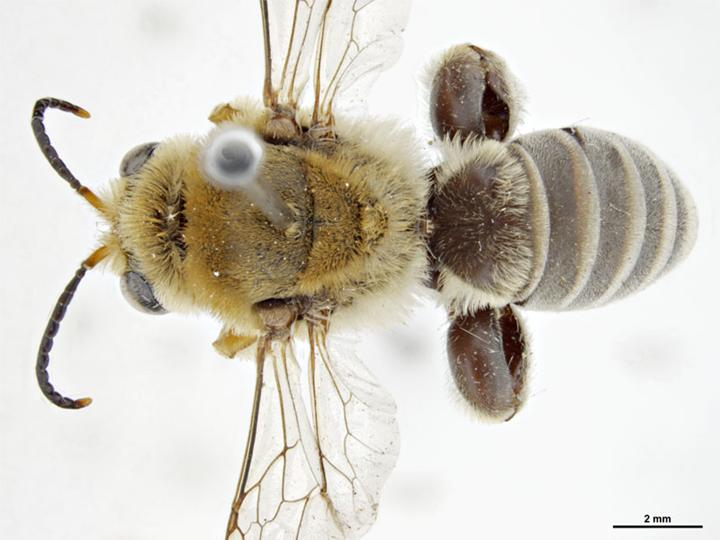
Male
