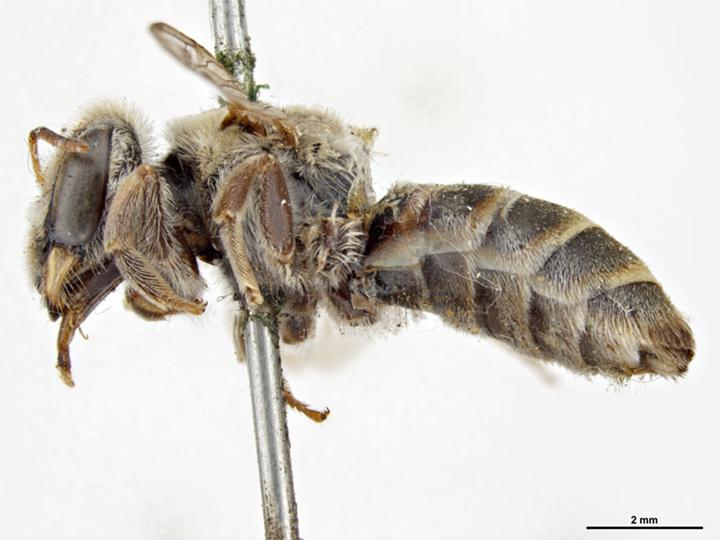
- Female

Scientific classification
- Kingdom: Animalia
- Phylum: Arthropoda
- Clade: Pancrustacea
- Class: Insecta
- Order: Hymenoptera
- Family: Colletidae
- Genus: Chrysocolletes
- Species: C. moretonianus

Binomial name
- Chrysocolletes moretonianus (Cockerell, 1905)

Synonyms
- Paracolletes moretonianus Cockerell, 1905

= Chrysocolletes moretonianus =

Species of bee

Chrysocolletes moretonianus is a species of bee in the family Colletidae and the subfamily Colletinae. It is endemic to Australia. It was described in 1905 by British-American entomologist Theodore Dru Alison Cockerell.

== Description ==
The body length of the holotype male is 11 mm. Colouration is black with red legs and pale yellow and golden pubescence.

== Distribution and habitat ==
The species occurs in eastern Australia. The type locality is Moreton Bay, Queensland.

== Behaviour ==
The adults are flying mellivores. Flowering plants visited by the bees include Goodenia and Velleia species.

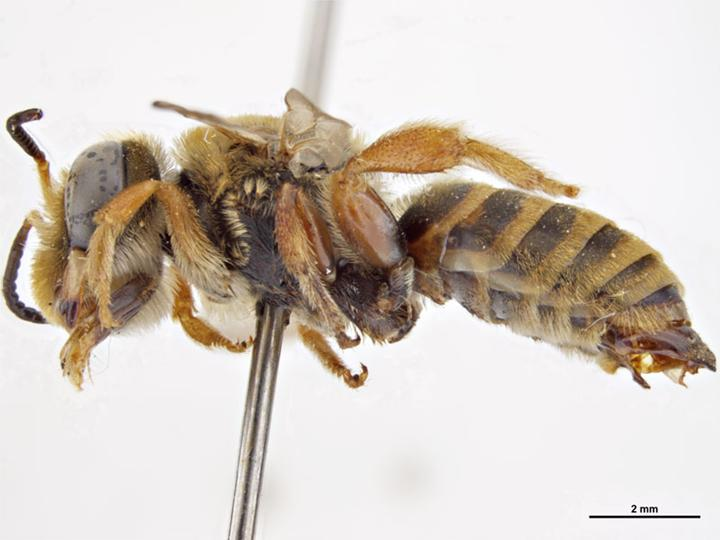
Male
