= Paracolletes subfuscus =

Scientific classification
- Kingdom: Animalia
- Phylum: Arthropoda
- Clade: Pancrustacea
- Class: Insecta
- Order: Hymenoptera
- Family: Colletidae
- Genus: Paracolletes
- Species: P. subfuscus

Binomial name
- Paracolletes subfuscus Cockerell, 1906

Species of bee

Paracolletes subfuscus, or Paracolletes (Paracolletes) subfuscus, is a species of bee in the family Colletidae and the subfamily Colletinae. It is endemic to Australia. It was described in 1906 by British-American entomologist Theodore Dru Alison Cockerell.

== Description ==
Body length of the male holotype is 13 mm. Colouration is mainly black with grey to greyish-brown hair.

== Distribution and habitat ==
The species occurs in South Australia. The type locality is Adelaide.

== Behaviour ==
The adults are flying mellivores.
