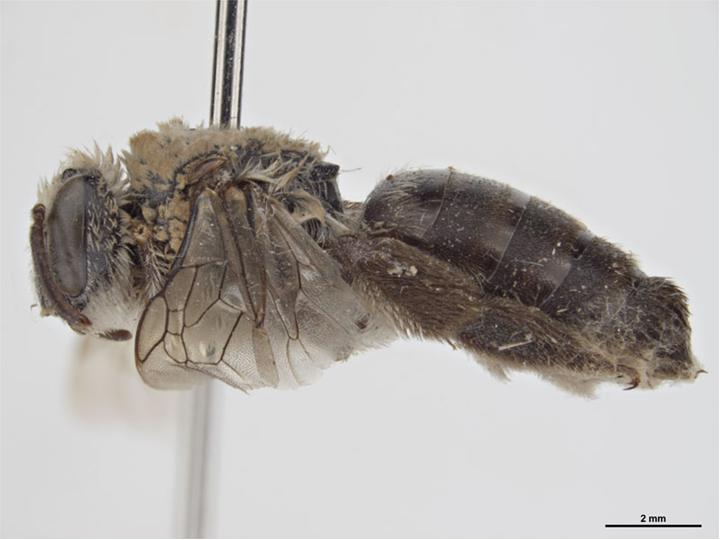
- Female

Scientific classification
- Kingdom: Animalia
- Phylum: Arthropoda
- Clade: Pancrustacea
- Class: Insecta
- Order: Hymenoptera
- Family: Colletidae
- Genus: Paracolletes
- Species: P. submacrodontus

Binomial name
- Paracolletes submacrodontus Rayment, 1934

= Paracolletes submacrodontus =

Species of bee

Paracolletes submacrodontus, or Paracolletes (Paracolletes) submacrodontus, is a species of bee in the family Colletidae and the subfamily Colletinae. It is endemic to Australia. It was described in 1934 by Australian entomologist Tarlton Rayment.

== Description ==
The body length of the male is 11 mm. Colouration is mainly black with white to grey hair.

== Distribution and habitat ==
The species occurs in both eastern and western Australia. The type locality is Rottnest Island, Western Australia. It has also been recorded from White Swamp, near Koreelah National Park in north-eastern New South Wales.

== Behaviour ==
The adults are flying mellivores.
