= Megachile albifrons =

Scientific classification
- Domain: Eukaryota
- Kingdom: Animalia
- Phylum: Arthropoda
- Class: Insecta
- Order: Hymenoptera
- Family: Megachilidae
- Genus: Megachile
- Species: M. apicata

Binomial name
- Megachile apicata Smith, 1853

Species of leafcutter bee (Megachile)

Megachile albifrons is a species of bee in the family Megachilidae. It was described by Smith in 1853.
