= Paracolletes convictus =

Scientific classification
- Kingdom: Animalia
- Phylum: Arthropoda
- Clade: Pancrustacea
- Class: Insecta
- Order: Hymenoptera
- Family: Colletidae
- Genus: Paracolletes
- Species: P. convictus

Binomial name
- Paracolletes convictus (Cockerell, 1909)

Synonyms
- Tetralonia convicta Cockerell, 1909

Species of bee

Paracolletes convictus, or Paracolletes (Paracolletes) convictus, is a species of bee in the family Colletidae and the subfamily Colletinae. It is endemic to Australia. It was described in 1909 by British-American entomologist Theodore Dru Alison Cockerell.

== Distribution and habitat ==
The species occurs in south-eastern Australia. The type locality is simply given as 'Australia'. However, it has been recorded from Port Phillip, Victoria.

== Behaviour ==
The adults are flying mellivores.
