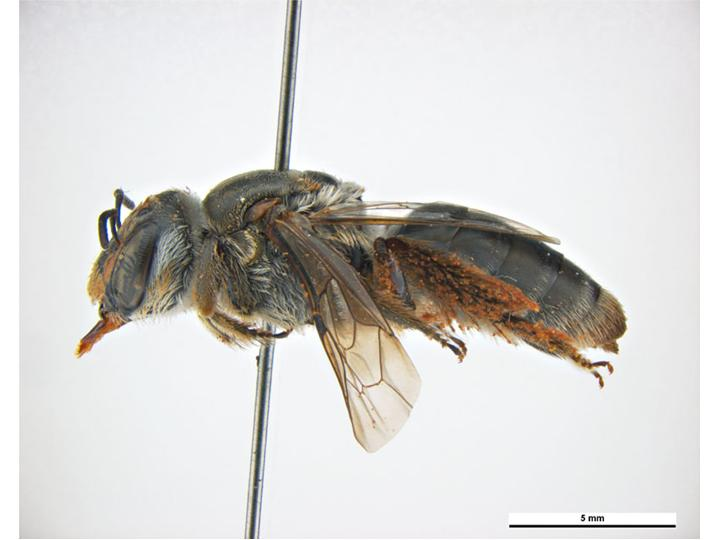
- Phenacolletes mimus, female

Scientific classification
- Kingdom: Animalia
- Phylum: Arthropoda
- Clade: Pancrustacea
- Class: Insecta
- Order: Hymenoptera
- Infraorder: Aculeata
- Superfamily: Apoidea
- Clade: Anthophila
- Family: Colletidae
- Genus: Phenacolletes; Cockerell, 1905

= Phenacolletes =

Genus of bees

Phenacolletes is a monotypic genus of bees in the family Colletidae and the subfamily Colletinae. It is endemic to Australia. It was described in 1905 by British-American entomologist Theodore Dru Alison Cockerell.

== Species ==
As of 2026 the genus contained one valid species:

- Phenacolletes mimus Cockerell, 1905

=== Description ===
Body length of the male is about 14 mm, wing length 10 mm. Colouration is mainly black with red markings and short white hair.

=== Distribution and habitat ===
The species occurs in Western Australia. The type locality is Turtle Bay, at the northern end of Dirk Hartog Island, in the Gascoyne region.

=== Behaviour ===
The adults are flying mellivores.

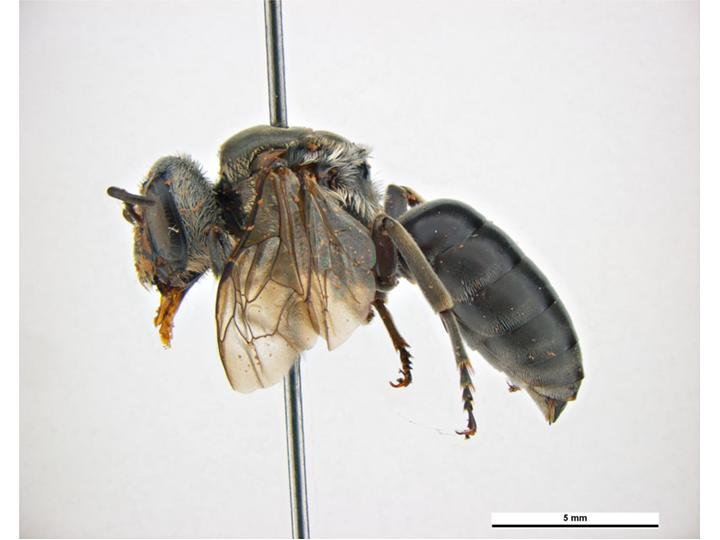
Phenacolletes mimus, male

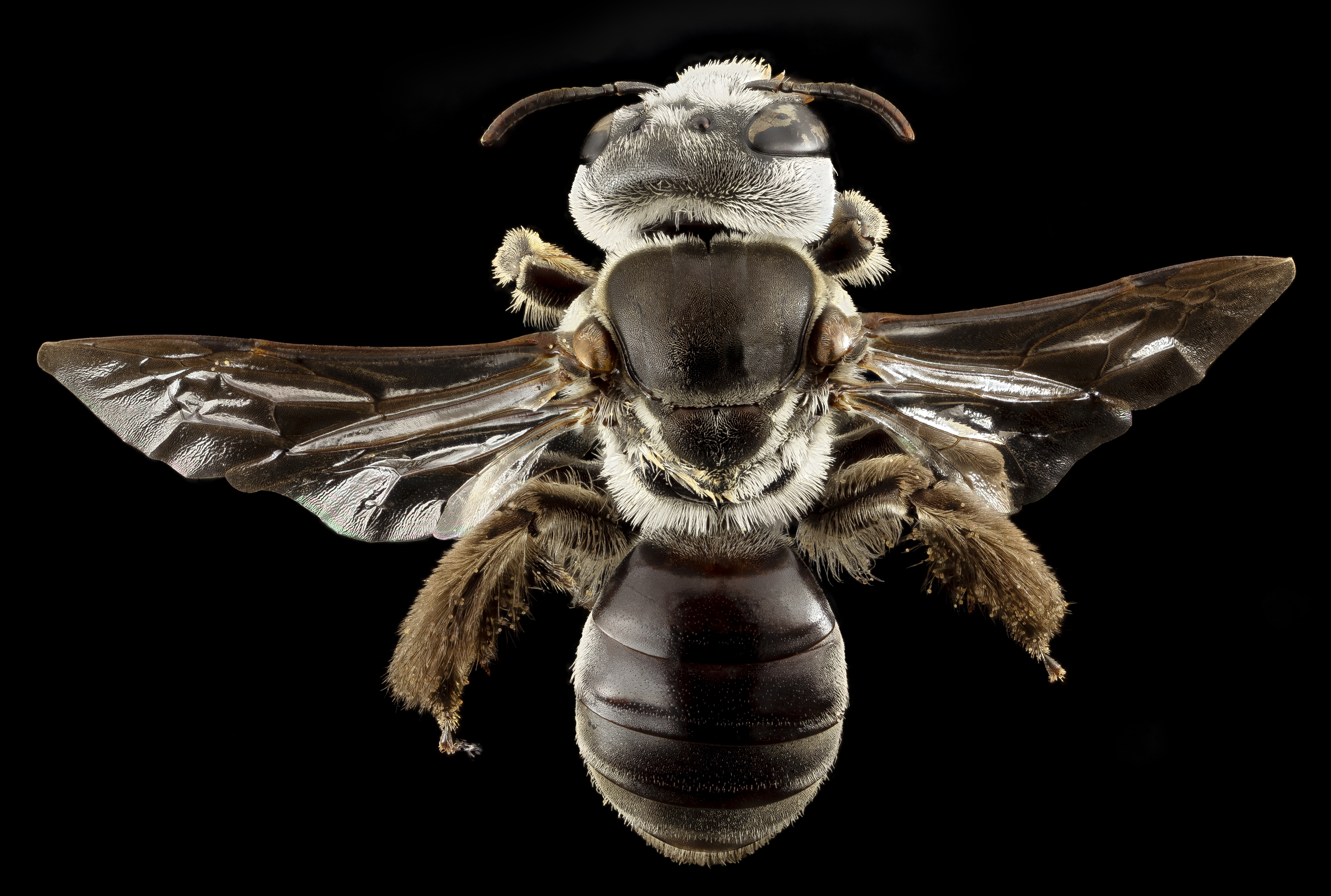
Dorsal view
