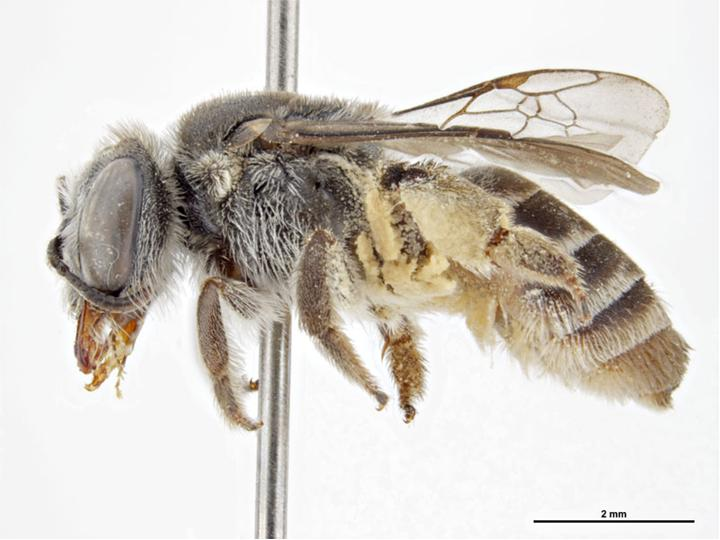
- Glossurocolletes bilobatus, female

Scientific classification
- Kingdom: Animalia
- Phylum: Arthropoda
- Clade: Pancrustacea
- Class: Insecta
- Order: Hymenoptera
- Superfamily: Apoidea
- Clade: Anthophila
- Family: Colletidae
- Subfamily: Colletinae
- Genus: Glossurocolletes; Michener, 1965

= Glossurocolletes =

Genus of bees

Glossurocolletes is a genus of bees in the family Colletidae and the subfamily Colletinae. It is endemic to Australia. It was described in 1965 by American entomologist Charles Duncan Michener.

== Species ==
As of 2026 the genus contained two valid species:

- Glossurocolletes bilobatus (Michener, 1965)
- Glossurocolletes xenoceratus (Michener, 1965)
