= Hesperocolletes =

Scientific classification
- Kingdom: Animalia
- Phylum: Arthropoda
- Clade: Pancrustacea
- Class: Insecta
- Order: Hymenoptera
- Family: Colletidae
- Subfamily: Colletinae
- Tribe: Paracolletini
- Genus: Hesperocolletes; Michener, 1965
- Species: H. douglasi

Binomial name
- Hesperocolletes douglasi Michener, 1965

Genus of bees

Hesperocolletes douglasi, the Rottnest bee or Douglas's broad-headed bee, is a rediscovered species of plasterer bee that is endemic to Australia, and the sole known member of its genus. It belongs to the subfamily Paracolletinae, part of the large family Colletidae. It is named for its collector, A.M. Douglas,

== Taxonomy ==
Bee expert Charles Michener described and named the species in 1965 on the basis of the 1938 specimen, designating it as the holotype, and creating the monotypic genus Hesperocolletes.

== Description ==
The bee's body is black, shiny and 12 mm long. The wings are brown and up to 8 mm long. It is about the same size as a honey bee. It is generally black and brown and moderately hairy. It superficially resembles some other native bees; careful examination under a microscope is required to distinguish a specimen.

Colletids are characterized by having a short, broad, blunt tongue ("glossa") (a flexible, hairy appendage at the end of the proboscis, not always visible as it can be retracted). Paracolletines (at least in most species, including H. douglasi) have three submarginal cells in the forewing. Females usually have densely hairy hind legs (for carrying pollen). The diagnostic characters of H. douglasi can occur individually in various paracolletine bees, and it is the combination of those features that one must look for:

- lower part of face yellow-brown
- labrum (a hinged flap attached to the lower margin of the face) more than twice as wide as long and not strongly convex
- a distinct carina (sharp edge) around and especially behind each compound eye
- tarsal claws with inner prongs expanded and flattened

== Distribution and habitat ==
The species was described from a single specimen collected in 1938 on Rottnest Island, located off the coast of Western Australia. A second specimen was found in 2015, in Banksia woodland at Pinjar, Western Australia. A further, female, specimen was found in 2015, in "an isolated banksia woodland remnant in the Southwest Floristic Region of Western Australia (...) in the Gnangara-Moore River State Forest, north of Perth". No record of the circumstances of collection (e.g. flowers visited) is available.

After its rediscovery in 2015, the species' conservation status was changed from "presumed extinct" to "critically endangered" under the Western Australian Wildlife Conservation Act. Little is known about its biology, ecology or geographic range, and its rediscovery highlights the importance of preservation, restoration and proper management of remnant vegetation in face of anthropogenic threats to safeguard habitat for biodiversity.

== See also ==
- Australian native bees
- Bees of Australia
