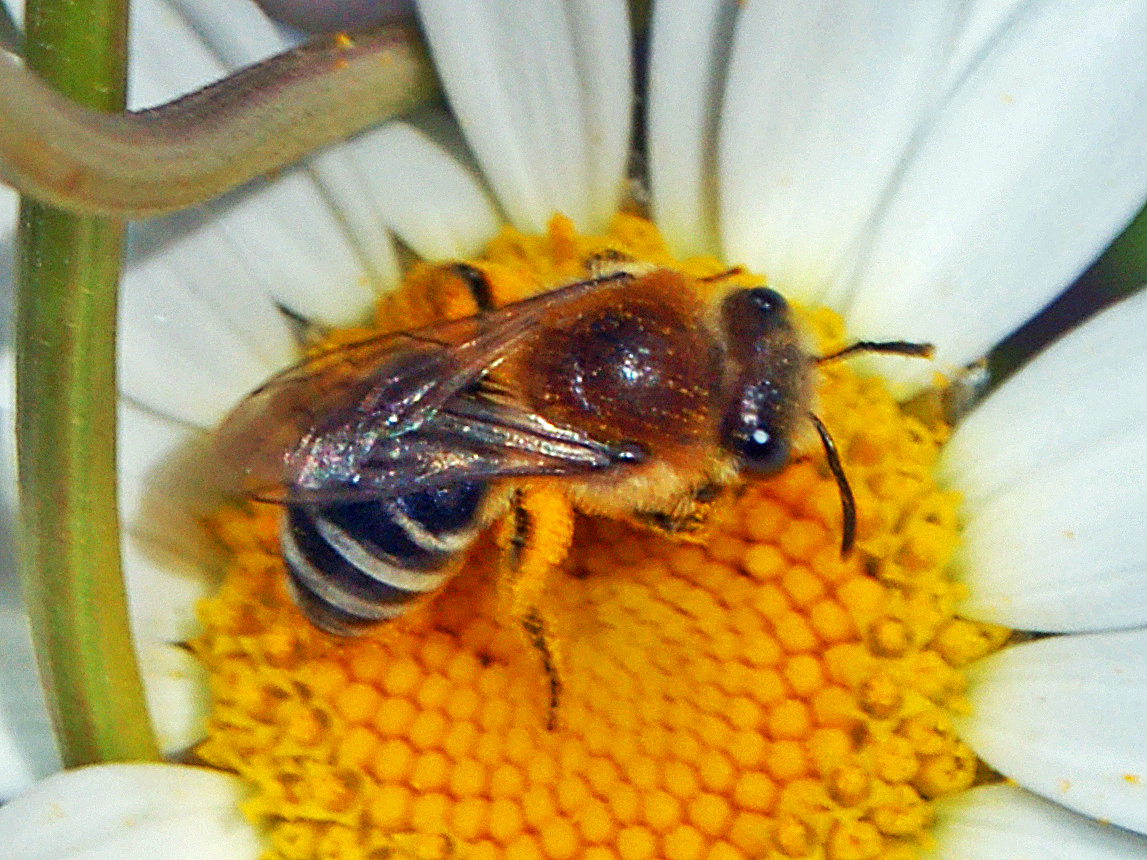
- Female of Colletes similis

Scientific classification
- Kingdom: Animalia
- Phylum: Arthropoda
- Clade: Pancrustacea
- Class: Insecta
- Order: Hymenoptera
- Family: Colletidae
- Genus: Colletes
- Species: C. similis

Binomial name
- Colletes similis Schenk, 1853

Synonyms
- Colletes picistigma Thomson, 1872

= Colletes similis =

Species of bee

Colletes similis is a species of plasterer bee belonging to the family Colletidae, subfamily Colletinae.

== Distribution ==
This species is present in the Palearctic realm, including most of Europe and Northern Asia (excluding China). It can also be found in Near East, in North Africa, and in Argentina.

== Habitat ==
These plasterer bee can be found on sandy soils, on coastal cliffs and dunes and on chalk grassland, meadows, hedge rows, moors, heaths and open woodland.

== Description ==
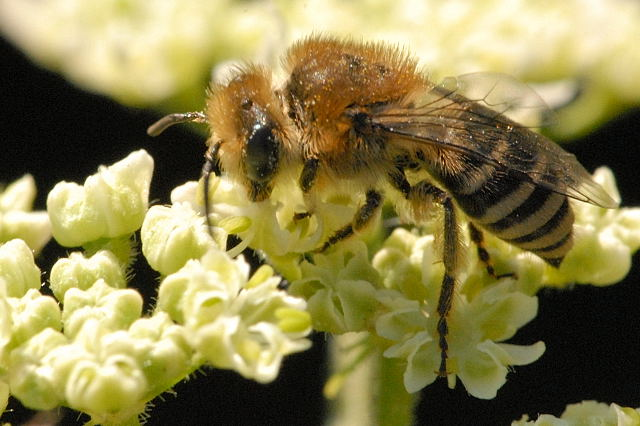
Side view

Colletes similis can reach a body length of about 7.5–10 mm (0.30–0.39 in) in males, of about 9–11 mm (0.35–0.43 in) in females. Forewing length can reach 5.5–7 mm (0.22–0.28 in) in males, about 6–7 mm (0.24–0.28 in) in females. Body of these bees is black and rather robust. Head and thorax are closely punctured, with dense fulvous hairs. Third joint of the antennae in the males is slightly longer than the fourth. Wings are slightly clouded, with pale nervures. Post scutellum and mesonotum show dense, fulvous hairs. Abdomen is slightly shining, ovate, finely rugulose, closely and distinctly punctured in the males. In the females abdomen is very finely punctured, with pale hairs on the basal segments and very short dark hairs on the others, First segment is nearly glabrous, second, third and fourth segments have a lateral apical band of white hairs. Legs are clothed with pale hairs.

== Biology ==
Colletes similisis an univoltine species. Adults can be found from mid June to mid September. They usually nest in small aggregations in closely self scattered burrows, that they dug into the bare ground, on slopes and in vegetation-poor areas. The species overwinters as a resting larva. They mainly collect pollen from Asteraceae (Tanacetum vulgare, Leontodon autumnalis, Cirsium arvense, Silybum marianum, Senecio, Inula, Pulicaria, Achillea, Hypochaeris and Sonchus species ), but also on Apiaceae (Daucus carota, Angelica sylvestris, Heracleum sphondylium), Resedaceae (Reseda lutea), Rosaceae (Filipendula vulgaris), Cucurbitaceae (Bryonia dioica), Euphorbiaceae (Euphorbia species) and Campanulaceae (Jasione montana).
