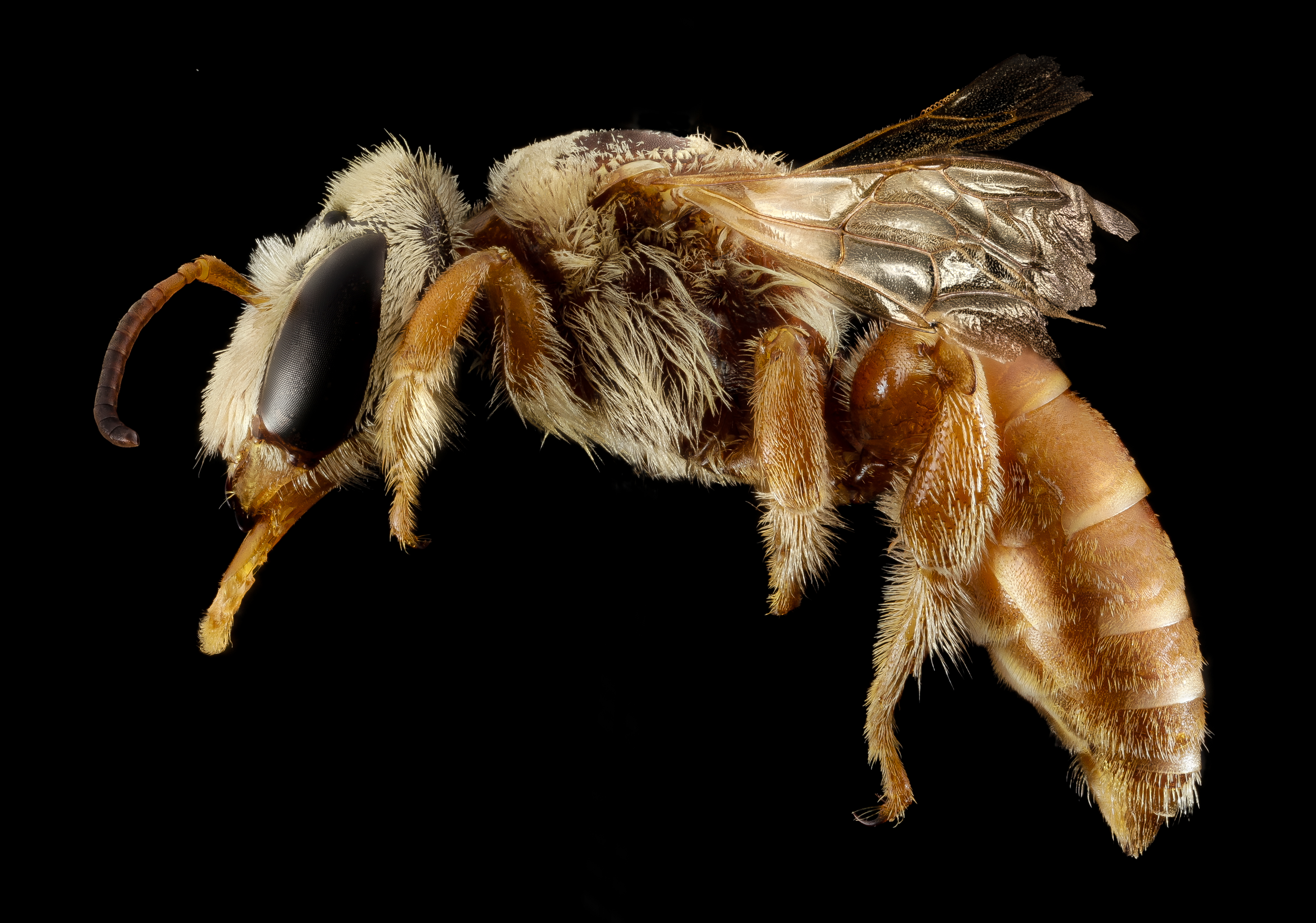
- Chrysocolletes sp., male

Scientific classification
- Kingdom: Animalia
- Phylum: Arthropoda
- Clade: Pancrustacea
- Class: Insecta
- Order: Hymenoptera
- Superfamily: Apoidea
- Clade: Anthophila
- Family: Colletidae
- Subfamily: Colletinae
- Genus: Chrysocolletes; Michener, 1965

= Chrysocolletes =

Genus of bees

Chrysocolletes is a genus of bees in the family Colletidae and the subfamily Colletinae. It is endemic to Australia. It was described in 1965 by American entomologist Charles Duncan Michener, and revised in 1996 by Glynn Maynard.

== Species ==
As of 2026 the genus contained eight valid species:

- Chrysocolletes aureus Leijs & Hogendoorn, 2021
- Chrysocolletes doreyi Leijs & Hogendoorn, 2021
- Chrysocolletes enigma Maynard, 1996
- Chrysocolletes houstoni Maynard, 1996
- Chrysocolletes loripes Leijs & Hogendoorn, 2021
- Chrysocolletes moretonianus (Cockerell, 1905)
- Chrysocolletes pilosus Maynard, 1996
- Chrysocolletes strangomeles Maynard, 1996
