= West Kimberley =

Western Australian region

West Kimberley is a sub region of the Kimberley region of Western Australia.

The region is defined according to different purposes. The area has been listed as a heritage area. Related to the heritage listing, the area has had portions that have been omitted due to extant mining leases.

The name is also included in the current local government name of Shire of Derby-West Kimberley, which was known earlier as the West Kimberley Road Board.
