= Frederick Smith (entomologist) =

British entomologist (1805–1879)

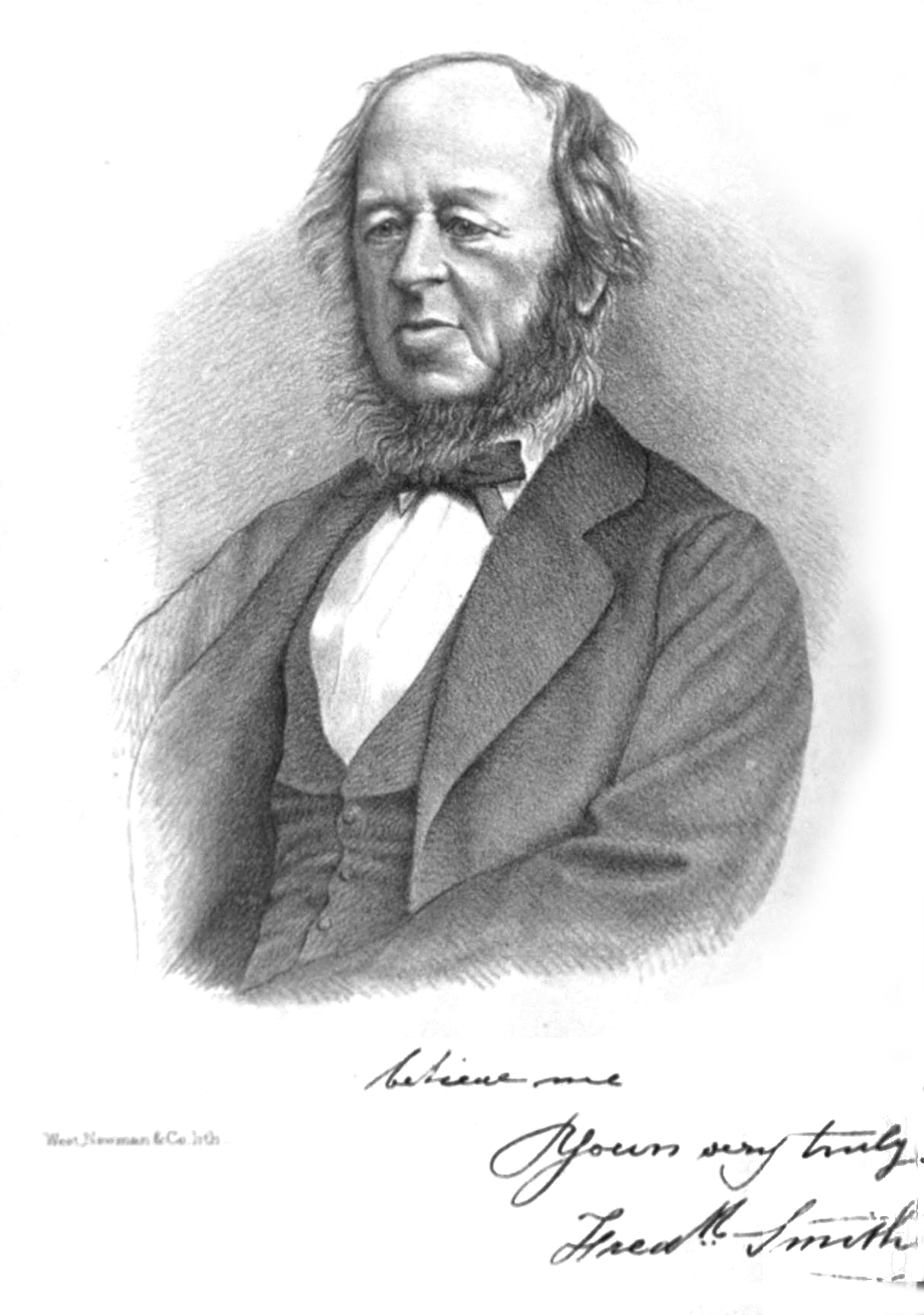
- Born: 30 December 1805; London
- Died: 16 February 1879 (aged 73)
- Resting place: Finchley
- Occupation: Entomologist; botanist; scientific collector; zoologist
- Children: Edgar Albert Smith
- Academic career
- Author abbrev. (botany): F.Sm.
- Position held: President of the Royal Entomological Society (1862–1863)

Frederick Smith (30 December 1805 – 16 February 1879) was a British entomologist who worked at the zoology department of the British Museum from 1849, specialising in the Hymenoptera.

== Life and work ==
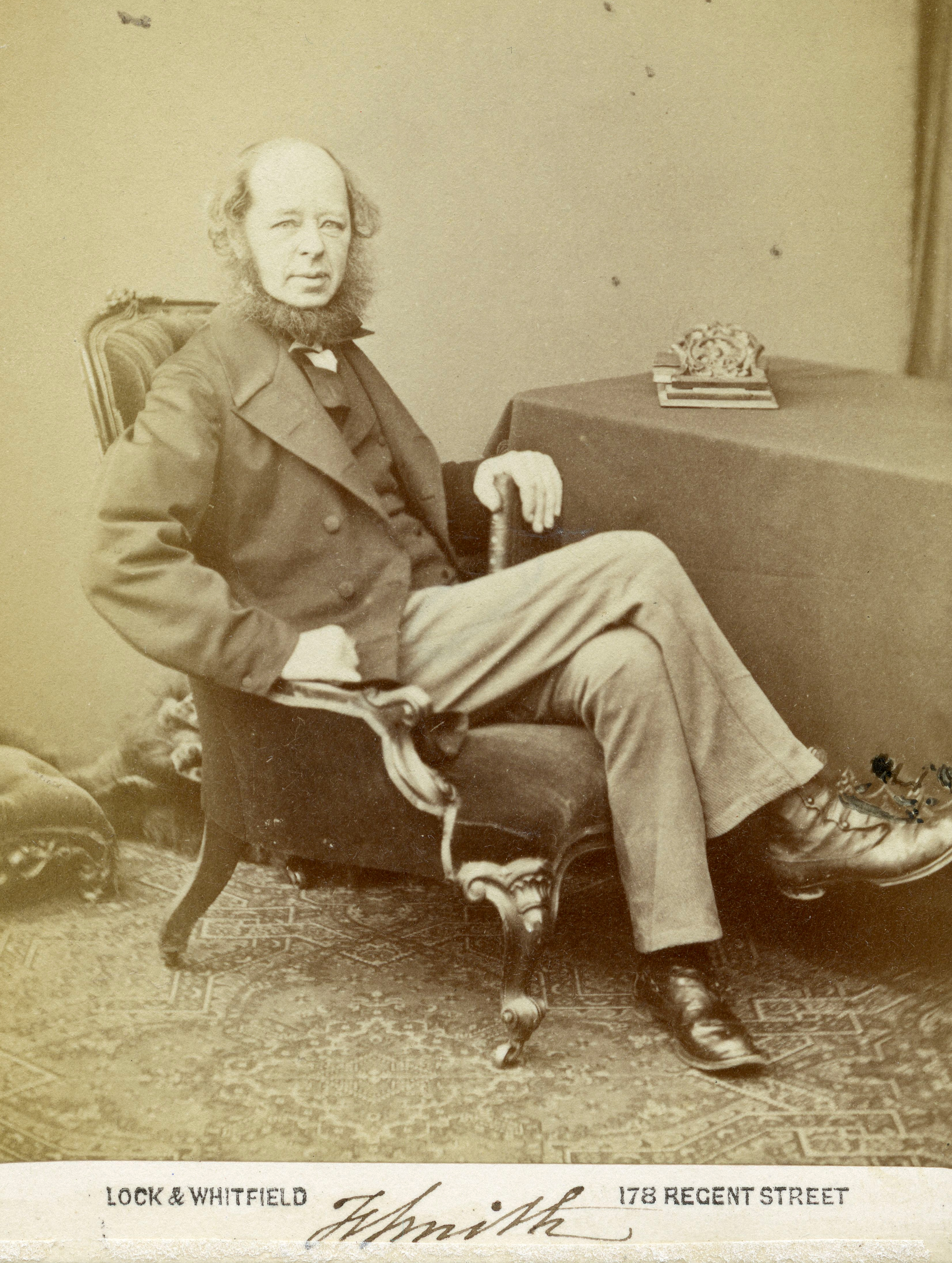

Smith was born near York to William Smith and went to school at Leeds. He then studied under landscape engraver W.B. Cooke along with his nephew William Edward Shuckard. Together they took an interest in insects, especially the ants and bees. In 1841, following the death of William Bainbridge, he became a curator of the collections and the library of the Entomological Society of London. As an engraver, he produced copies based on the works of Turner, Constable and David Roberts. He also worked with Gray arranging Hymenoptera in the British Museum. In 1849 he succeeded Edward Doubleday as a member of the zoology department. He then gave up his artwork but produced the plates for Wollaston's Insecta Maderensia (1854) and for papers in the Transactions of the Entomological Society. In 1875, he was promoted to Assistant Keeper of Zoology. His publications included Catalogue of Hymenopterous Insects (7 parts, 1853–1859) and parts 5 (1851) and 6 (1852) of the Nomenclature of Coleopterous Insects. In these volumes, he catalogued hundreds of bees. Many of these bees he named, including Bombus frigidus, Halictus coriaceus, and Nomia nasalis, which he discovered.

Smith was president of the Entomological Society of London, 1862–3.

He died on 16 February 1879 after undergoing surgery for gallstones. He was buried at Finchley Cemetery.

His son was Edgar Albert Smith (1847–1916) was a zoologist and malacologist.

== Bibliography ==
- Publications of Frederick Smith. Hymenoptera On-Line Database.

== See also ==
- Taxa named by Frederick Smith (entomologist)
