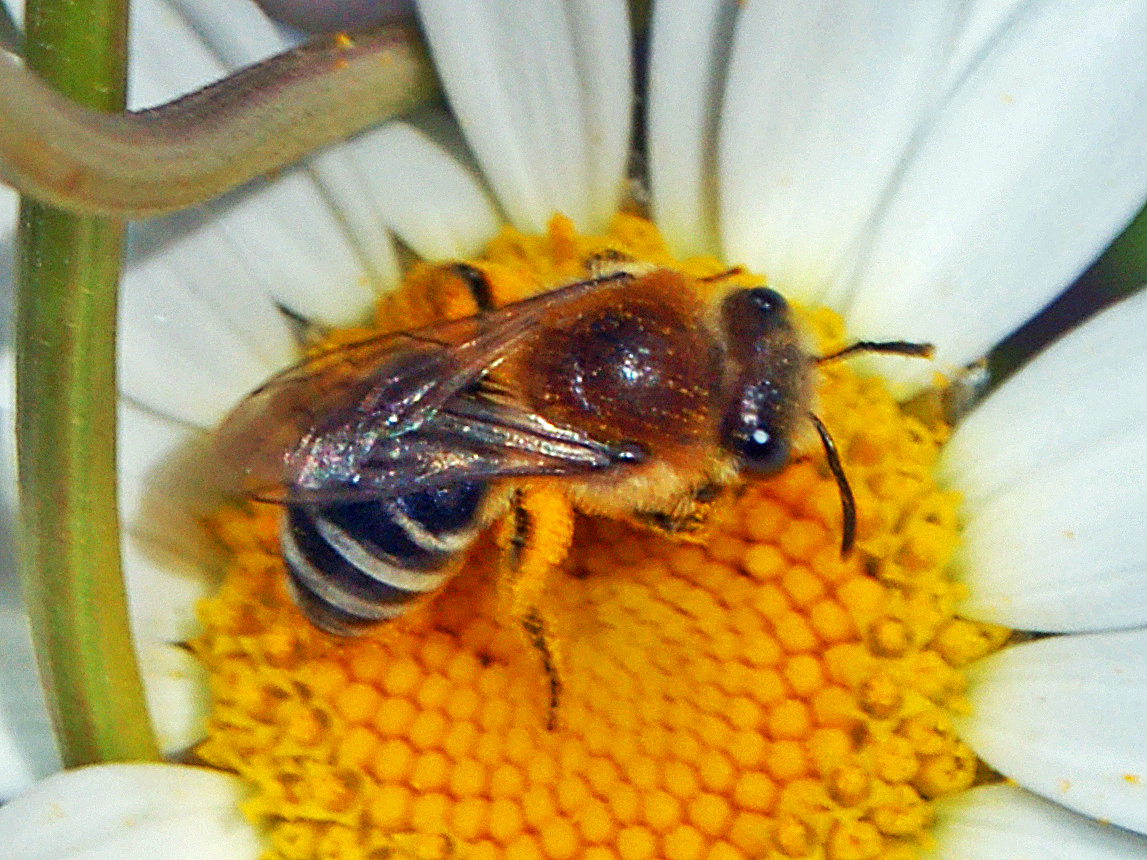
- Colletes similis

Scientific classification
- Domain: Eukaryota
- Kingdom: Animalia
- Phylum: Arthropoda
- Class: Insecta
- Order: Hymenoptera
- Family: Colletidae
- Subfamily: Colletinae

= Colletinae =

Subfamily of bees

Colletinae is a subfamily of bees belonging to the family Colletidae.

Wing venation in Colletinae

== Genera ==
Genera within this subfamily include:

- Brachyglossula Hedicke, 1922
- Callomelitta Smith, 1853
- Chrysocolletes Michener, 1965
- Colletes Latreille, 1802
- Eulonchopria Brèthes, 1909
- Glossurocolletes Michener, 1965
- Hesperocolletes Michener, 1965
- Leioproctus Smith, 1853
- Lonchopria Vachal, 1905
- Lonchorhyncha Michener, 1989
- Mourecotelles Toro & Cabezas, 1977
- Neopasiphae Perkins, 1912
- Niltonia Moure, 1964
- Paracolletes Smith, 1853
- Phenacolletes Cockerell, 1905
- Trichocolletes Cockerell, 1912
