= List of Braunsapis species =

This is a list of species in genus Braunsapis.

== Species ==
- Braunsapis acuticauda Michener, 1971
- Braunsapis affinissima (Gribodo, 1896)
- Braunsapis albipennis (Friese, 1909)
- Braunsapis albitarsis (Friese, 1924)
- Braunsapis albolineata (Cockerell, 1934)
- Braunsapis angolensis (Cockerell, 1933)
- Braunsapis antandroy Brooks & Pauly, 2001
- Braunsapis anthracina Reyes, 1993
- Braunsapis apicalis Reyes, 1991
- Braunsapis associata (Michener, 1961)
- Braunsapis aurantipes Reyes, 1991
- Braunsapis aureoscopa Michener, 1975
- Braunsapis biroi (Friese, 1909)
- Braunsapis bislensis Michener & Borges, 2003
- Braunsapis boharti (Krombein, 1951)
- Braunsapis bouyssoui (Vachal, 1903)
- Braunsapis breviceps (Cockerell, 1920)
- Braunsapis calidula (Cockerell, 1908)
- Braunsapis clarihirta Reyes, 1991
- Braunsapis clarissima (Cockerell, 1929)
- Braunsapis cupulifera (Vachal, 1895)
- Braunsapis debilis (Cockerell, 1934)
- Braunsapis diminuta (Cockerell, 1915)
- Braunsapis diminutoides Reyes, 1993
- Braunsapis dolichocephala Reyes, 1993
- Braunsapis draconis Michener, 1971
- Braunsapis elizabethana (Strand, 1915)
- Braunsapis eximia Reyes, 1993
- Braunsapis facialis (Gerstäcker, 1858)
- Braunsapis falcata Reyes, 1993
- Braunsapis flavitarsis (Gerstäcker, 1870)
- Braunsapis flaviventris Reyes, 1991
- Braunsapis foveata (Smith, 1854)
- Braunsapis fuscinervis (Cameron, 1905)
- Braunsapis ghanae Michener, 1975
- Braunsapis gorillarum (Cockerell, 1936)
- Braunsapis hewitti (Cameron, 1908)
- Braunsapis hirsuta Reyes, 1993
- Braunsapis hyalina Reyes, 1993
- Braunsapis indica Reyes, 1991
- Braunsapis kaliago Reyes & Sakagami, 1990
- Braunsapis langenburgensis (Strand, 1915)
- Braunsapis lateralis Reyes, 1991
- Braunsapis leptozonia (Vachal, 1909)
- Braunsapis liliputana (Strand, 1915)
- Braunsapis longula (Friese, 1916)
- Braunsapis luapulana (Cockerell, 1936)
- Braunsapis lyrata (Cockerell, 1935)
- Braunsapis maculata Reyes, 1991
- Braunsapis madecassa (Benoist, 1954)
- Braunsapis madecassella Michener, 1977
- Braunsapis malliki Reyes, 1991
- Braunsapis minor (Michener & Syed, 1962)
- Braunsapis minutula (Friese, 1914)
- Braunsapis mixta (Smith, 1852)
- Braunsapis natalica Michener, 1970
- Braunsapis nautica (Cockerell, 1935)
- Braunsapis neavei (Vachal, 1910)
- Braunsapis nitida (Smith, 1859)
- Braunsapis occidentalis (Michener & Syed, 1962)
- Braunsapis otavica (Cockerell, 1939)
- Braunsapis palavanica (Cockerell, 1916)
- Braunsapis pallid a Michener, 1975
- Braunsapis paradoxa (Strand, 1915)
- Braunsapis philippinensis (Ashmead, 1904)
- Braunsapis picitarsis (Cameron, 1902)
- Braunsapis platyura Reyes, 1993
- Braunsapis plebeia (Cockerell, 1929)
- Braunsapis plumosa Reyes, 1993
- Braunsapis praesumptiosa (Michener, 1961)
- Braunsapis protuberans Reyes, 1993
- Braunsapis puangensis (Cockerell, 1929)
- Braunsapis reducta (Cockerell, 1916)
- Braunsapis reversa (Cockerell, 1916)
- Braunsapis rhodesi (Cockerell, 1936)
- Braunsapis rolini (Vachal, 1903)
- Braunsapis rubicundula (Strand, 1915)
- Braunsapis rugosella (Cockerell, 1936)
- Braunsapis signata Reyes, 1991
- Braunsapis simillima (Smith, 1854)
- Braunsapis simplicipes Michener, 1971
- Braunsapis somatotheca (Strand, 1915)
- Braunsapis strandi (Masi, 1930)
- Braunsapis stuckenbergorum Michener, 1971
- Braunsapis trochanterata (Gerstäcker, 1870)
- Braunsapis unicolor (Smith, 1854)
- Braunsapis verticalis Reyes, 1993
- Braunsapis virilipicta (Strand, 1915)
- Braunsapis vitrea (Vachal, 1903)
