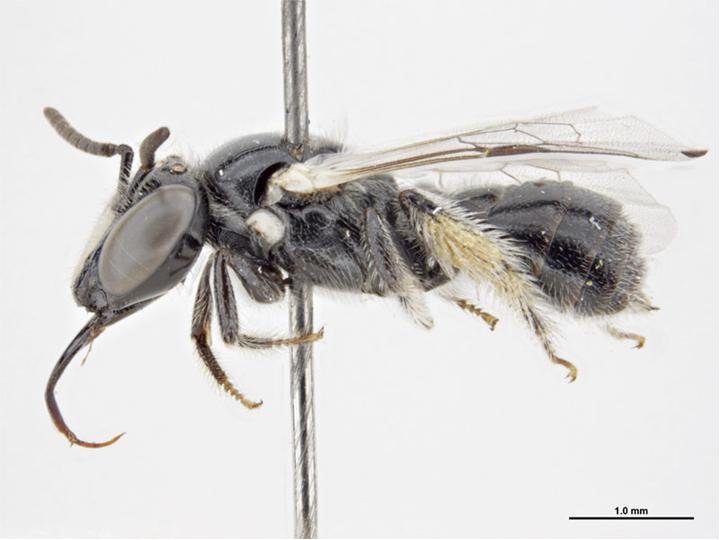
- Female, lateral view

Scientific classification
- Kingdom: Animalia
- Phylum: Arthropoda
- Clade: Pancrustacea
- Class: Insecta
- Order: Hymenoptera
- Family: Apidae
- Genus: Braunsapis
- Species: B. diminutoides

Binomial name
- Braunsapis diminutoides Reyes, 1993

= Braunsapis diminutoides =

Species of bee

Braunsapis diminutoides is a species of bee in the family Apidae and the tribe Allodapini. It is endemic to Australia. It was described in 1993 by Filipino entomologist Stephen Reyes.

== Etymology ==
The specific epithet diminutoides refers both to its relative size and its similarity to Braunsapis diminuta and Braunsapis clarissima.

== Description ==
Body length is 4.5–6.0 mm.

== Distribution and habitat ==
The species occurs in the tropical Top End of the Northern Territory. The type locality is Cooper Creek, 11 km south by west of Nimbuwah Rock and the western Arnhem Land escarpment.

== Behaviour ==
The adults are flying mellivores.

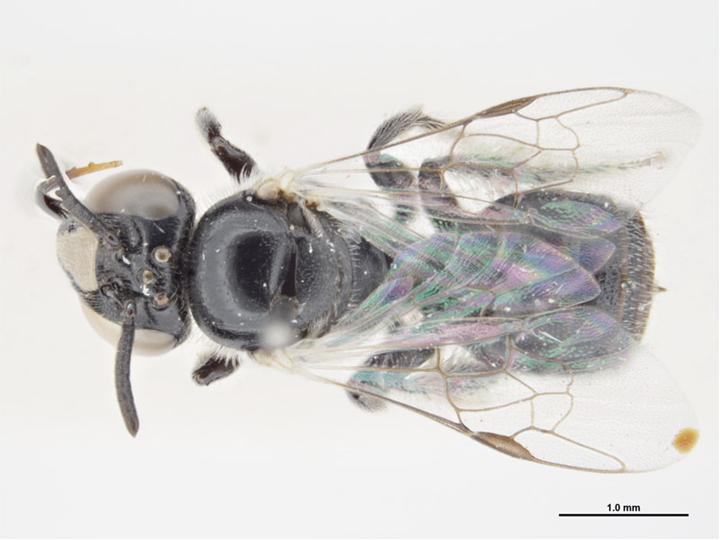
Female, dorsal view
