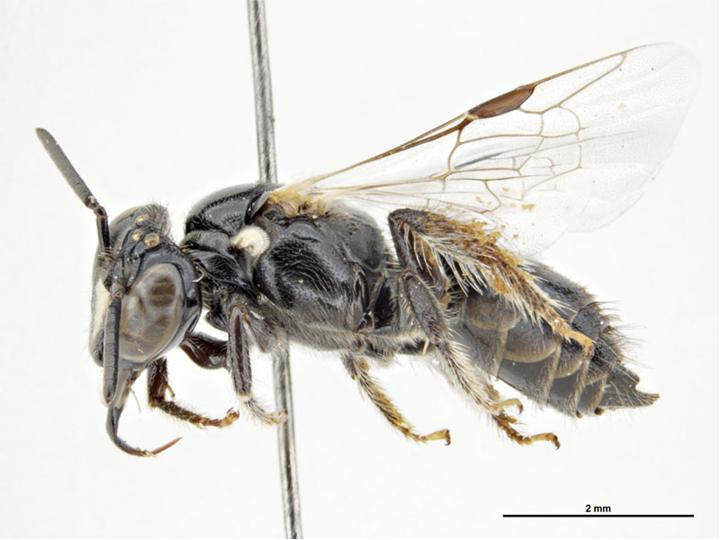
- Female, lateral view

Scientific classification
- Kingdom: Animalia
- Phylum: Arthropoda
- Clade: Pancrustacea
- Class: Insecta
- Order: Hymenoptera
- Family: Apidae
- Genus: Braunsapis
- Species: B. associata

Binomial name
- Braunsapis associata (Michener, 1961)

Synonyms
- Allodapula associata Michener, 1961

= Braunsapis associata =

Species of bee

Braunsapis associata is a species of bee in the family Apidae and the tribe Allodapini. It is endemic to Australia. It was described in 1961 by American entomologist Charles Duncan Michener.

== Distribution and habitat ==
The species occurs in Queensland and the Northern Territory. The type locality is Mount Edwards.

== Behaviour ==
The species nests in dead twigs. It may be kleptoparasitic, though females have been recorded with pollen on their scopae. They have been found in the nests of Braunsapis unicolor.

The adults are flying mellivores. Flowering plants visited by the bees include Eucalyptus species.

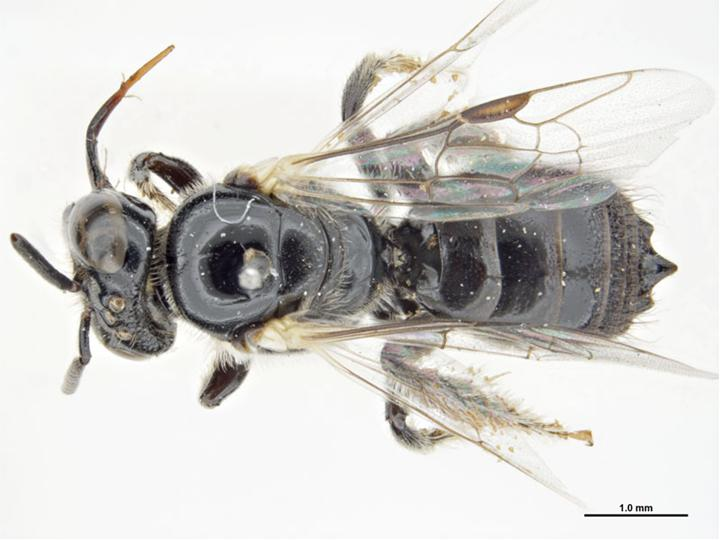
Female, dorsal view
