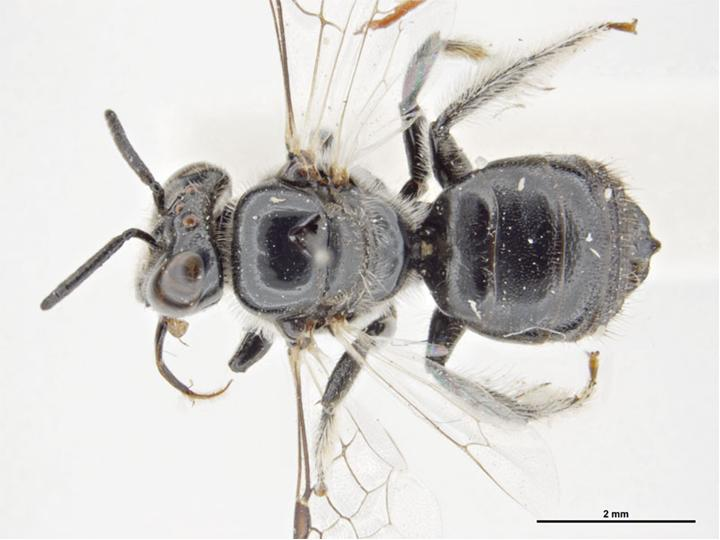
- Female, dorsal view

Scientific classification
- Kingdom: Animalia
- Phylum: Arthropoda
- Clade: Pancrustacea
- Class: Insecta
- Order: Hymenoptera
- Family: Apidae
- Genus: Braunsapis
- Species: B. praesumptiosa

Binomial name
- Braunsapis praesumptiosa (Michener, 1961)

Synonyms
- Allodapula praesumptiosa Michener, 1961

= Braunsapis praesumptiosa =

Species of bee

Braunsapis praesumptiosa is a species of bee in the family Apidae and the tribe Allodapini. It is endemic to Australia. It was described in 1961 by American entomologist Charles Duncan Michener.

== Distribution and habitat ==
The species occurs in Queensland. The type locality is Mackay.

== Behaviour ==
The species may be kleptoparasitic on Braunsapis simillima, though females have been recorded with pollen on their scopae.

The adults are flying mellivores. Flowering plants visited by the bees include Cassia, Eugenia and Xanthorrhoea species.
