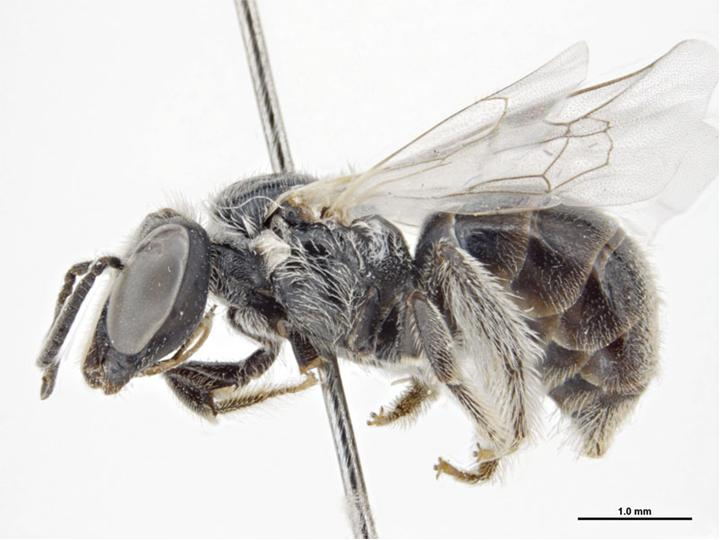
- Female

Scientific classification
- Kingdom: Animalia
- Phylum: Arthropoda
- Clade: Pancrustacea
- Class: Insecta
- Order: Hymenoptera
- Family: Apidae
- Genus: Braunsapis
- Species: B. plumosa

Binomial name
- Braunsapis plumosa Reyes, 1993

= Braunsapis plumosa =

Species of bee

Braunsapis plumosa is a species of bee in the family Apidae and the tribe Allodapini. It is endemic to Australia. It was described in 1993 by Filipino entomologist Stephen Reyes.

== Etymology ==
The specific epithet plumosa is an anatomical reference, derived from Latin plumosus (‘feathered’).

== Description ==
Body length is 5.0–6.25 mm.

== Distribution and habitat ==
The species occurs in the Top End of the Northern Territory. The type locality is 46 km south-south-west of Borroloola. It has also been recorded from Kakadu National Park.

== Behaviour ==
The adults are flying mellivores.
