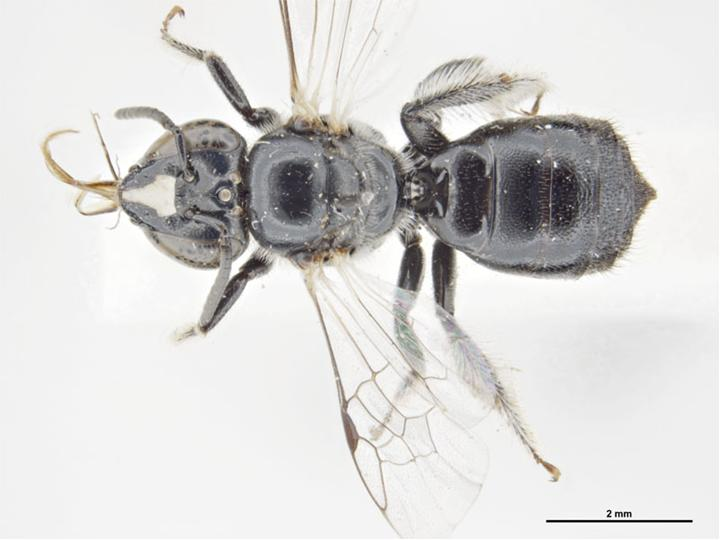
- Female, dorsal view

Scientific classification
- Kingdom: Animalia
- Phylum: Arthropoda
- Clade: Pancrustacea
- Class: Insecta
- Order: Hymenoptera
- Family: Apidae
- Genus: Braunsapis
- Species: B. protuberans

Binomial name
- Braunsapis protuberans Reyes, 1993

= Braunsapis protuberans =

Species of bee

Braunsapis protuberans is a species of bee in the family Apidae and the tribe Allodapini. It is native to Australia and New Guinea. It was described in 1993 by Filipino entomologist Stephen Reyes.

== Etymology ==
The specific epithet protuberans is an anatomical reference, from the Latin for ‘swelling’ or ‘protuberance’, to the middle of the epistomal suture.

== Description ==
Body length is 5.8–9.5 mm.

== Distribution and habitat ==
In Australia the species occurs in Queensland. The type locality is 2 km east by south of Hidden Valley.

== Behaviour ==
The adults are flying mellivores.
