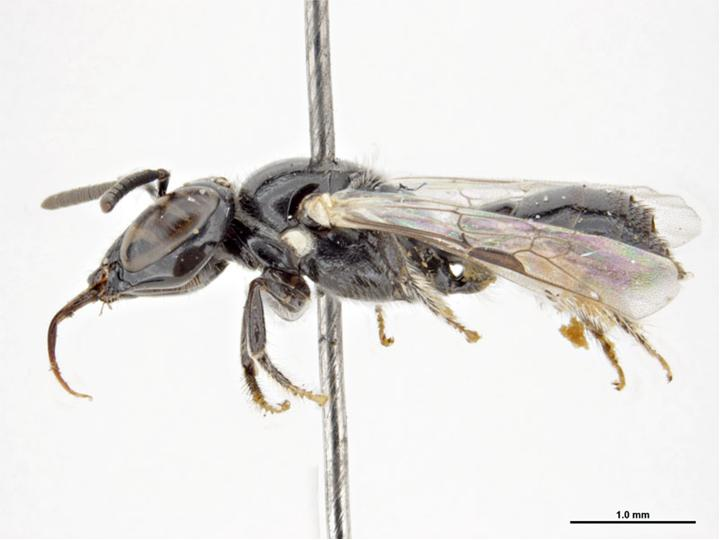
- Female, lateral view

Scientific classification
- Kingdom: Animalia
- Phylum: Arthropoda
- Clade: Pancrustacea
- Class: Insecta
- Order: Hymenoptera
- Family: Apidae
- Genus: Braunsapis
- Species: B. nitida

Binomial name
- Braunsapis nitida (Smith, 1859)

Synonyms
- Allodape nitida Smith, 1859

= Braunsapis nitida =

Species of bee

Braunsapis nitida is a species of bee in the family Apidae and the tribe Allodapini. It is native to Australasia. It was described in 1859 by English entomologist Frederick Smith.

== Distribution and habitat ==
The species occurs across much of mainland Australia as well as in the Aru and Kai Islands of the Arafura Sea. The type locality is the Aru Islands.

== Behaviour ==
The adults are flying mellivores. They nest in dead, dry twigs, including those of Stachys species. Several females may occupy one nest, with larvae of different ages found together, not in separate cells.

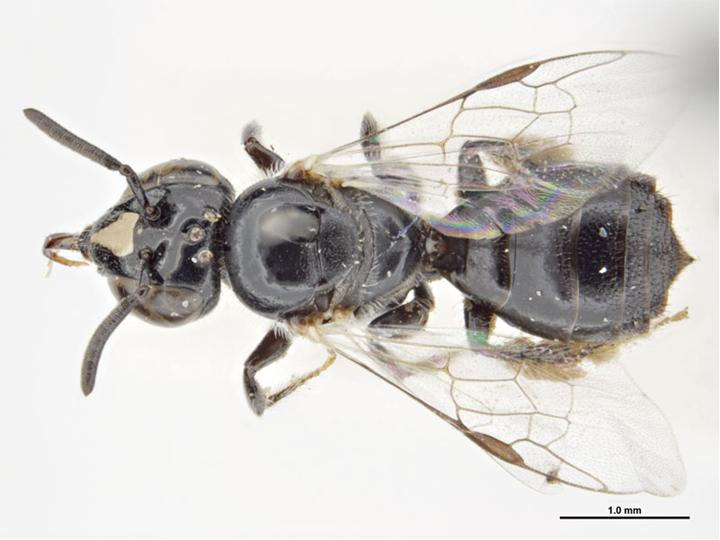
Female, dorsal view
