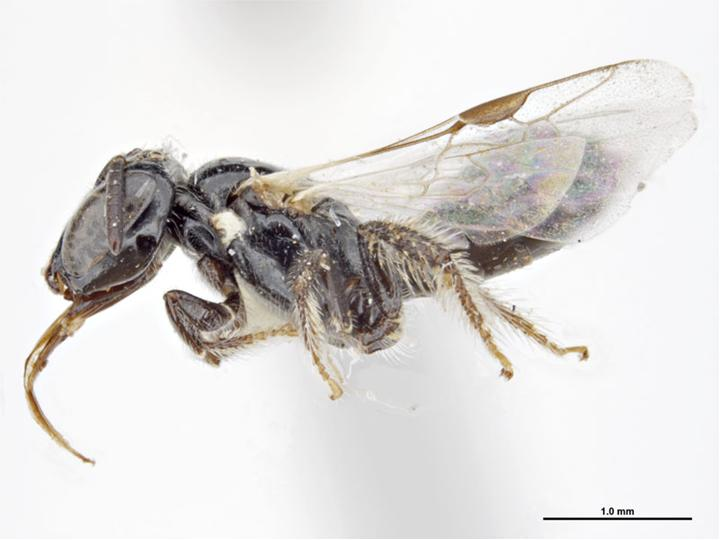
- Female, lateral view

Scientific classification
- Kingdom: Animalia
- Phylum: Arthropoda
- Clade: Pancrustacea
- Class: Insecta
- Order: Hymenoptera
- Family: Apidae
- Genus: Braunsapis
- Species: B. hyalina

Binomial name
- Braunsapis hyalina Reyes, 1993

= Braunsapis hyalina =

Species of bee

Braunsapis hyalina is a species of bee in the family Apidae and the tribe Allodapini. It is endemic to Australia. It was described in 1993 by Filipino entomologist Stephen Reyes.

== Etymology ==
The specific epithet hyalina is an anatomical reference, derived from Latin hyalinus (‘transparent’), to some of the tergal hair.

== Description ==
Body length is 3.25–5.4 mm.

== Distribution and habitat ==
The species occurs in Queensland. The type locality is Georgetown. Other known localities include Mount Isa and Toowoomba.

== Behaviour ==
The adults are flying mellivores.

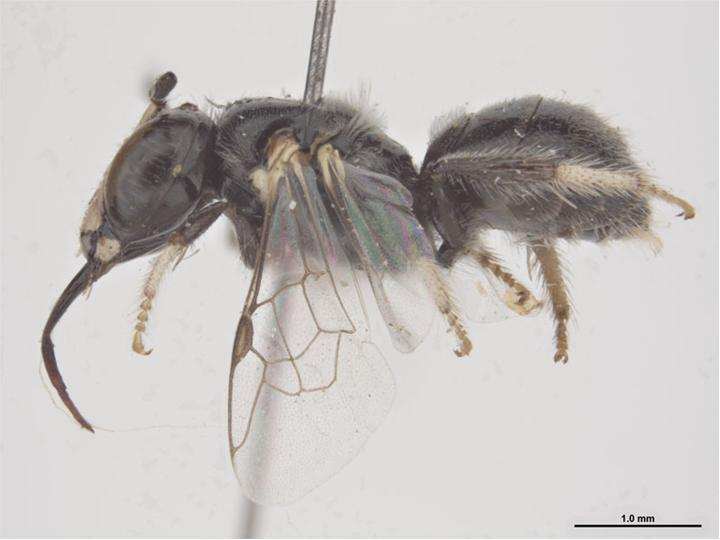
Male, lateral view
