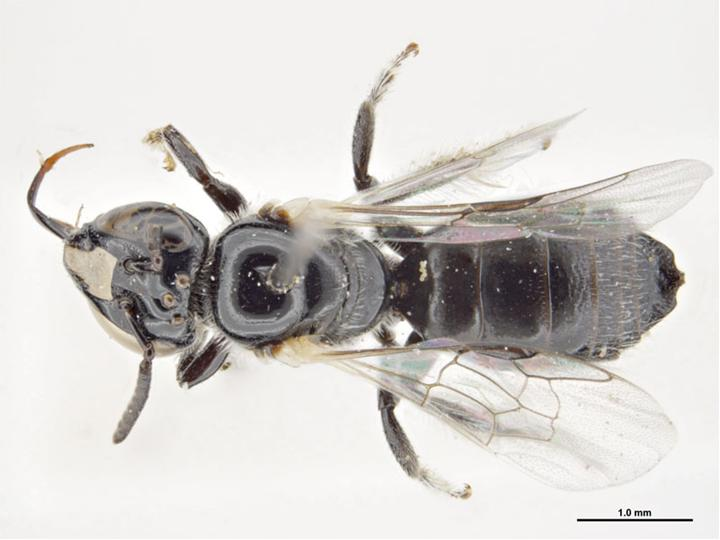
- Female, dorsal view

Scientific classification
- Kingdom: Animalia
- Phylum: Arthropoda
- Clade: Pancrustacea
- Class: Insecta
- Order: Hymenoptera
- Family: Apidae
- Genus: Braunsapis
- Species: B. platyura

Binomial name
- Braunsapis platyura Reyes, 1993

= Braunsapis platyura =

Species of bee

Braunsapis platyura is a species of bee in the family Apidae and the tribe Allodapini. It is endemic to Australia. It was described in 1993 by Filipino entomologist Stephen Reyes.

== Etymology ==
The specific epithet platyura is an anatomical reference, derived from Greek platys (‘flat’) and oura (‘tail’).

== Description ==
Body length is 5.0–7.5 mm.

== Distribution and habitat ==
The species occurs in eastern Queensland. The type locality is 8 km north-north-west of Taroom.

== Behaviour ==
The adults are flying mellivores.
