= Braunsapis flaviventris =

Scientific classification
- Kingdom: Animalia
- Phylum: Arthropoda
- Class: Insecta
- Order: Hymenoptera
- Family: Apidae
- Genus: Braunsapis
- Species: B. flaviventris

Binomial name
- Braunsapis flaviventris Reyes, 1991

Species of bee

Braunsapis flaviventris is a species of bee belonging to the family Apidae subfamily Xylocopinae.
