= Braunsapis mixta =

Scientific classification
- Domain: Eukaryota
- Kingdom: Animalia
- Phylum: Arthropoda
- Class: Insecta
- Order: Hymenoptera
- Family: Apidae
- Genus: Braunsapis
- Species: B. mixta

Binomial name
- Braunsapis mixta (Smith, 1852)

Synonyms
- Prosopis mixtus Smith, 1852; Prosopis mixta Smith, 1852; Allodape marginata Smith, 1854; Prosopis mixtus Smith, 1852; Prosopis leucotarsis Cameron, 1897; Allodape pumilio Cockerell, 1911; Allodape mixta (Smith, 1852)

Species of bee

Braunsapis mixta, is a species of bee belonging to the family Apidae subfamily Apinae. Braunsapis mixta is an important pollinator of cashew. they are found in Southeast Asia, particularly in India. Braunsapis mixta nest in stems of pithy plants such as bamboo or cashew trees. These species provide their larvae offspring with pollen during their development.
