= Braunsapis picitarsis =

Scientific classification
- Kingdom: Animalia
- Phylum: Arthropoda
- Class: Insecta
- Order: Hymenoptera
- Family: Apidae
- Genus: Braunsapis
- Species: B. picitarsis

Binomial name
- Braunsapis picitarsis (Cameron, 1902)

Species of bee

Braunsapis picitarsis is a species of bee belonging to the family Apidae subfamily Apinae. It nests within the twigs of Caesalpinia pulcherrima.
