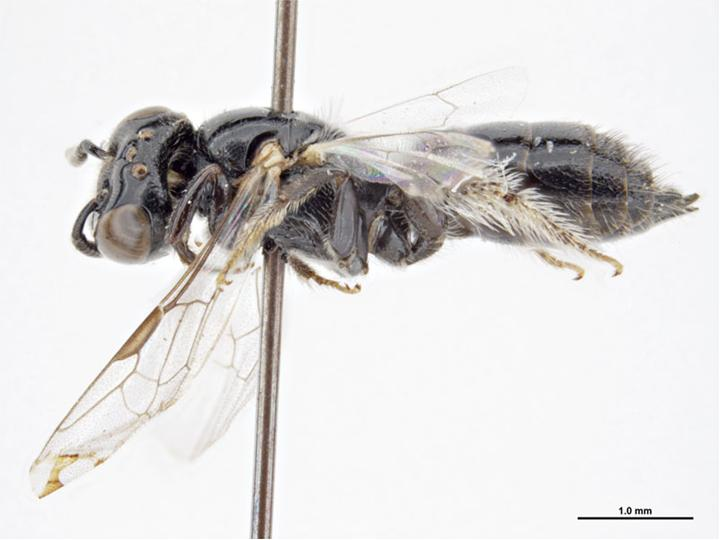
- Female, lateral view

Scientific classification
- Kingdom: Animalia
- Phylum: Arthropoda
- Clade: Pancrustacea
- Class: Insecta
- Order: Hymenoptera
- Family: Apidae
- Genus: Braunsapis
- Species: B. eximia

Binomial name
- Braunsapis eximia Reyes, 1993

= Braunsapis eximia =

Species of bee

Braunsapis eximia is a species of bee in the family Apidae and the tribe Allodapini. It is endemic to Australia. It was described in 1993 by Filipino entomologist Stephen Reyes.

== Etymology ==
The specific epithet eximia is an anatomical reference derived from Latin eximius (‘extraordinary’).

== Description ==
Body length is 4.2–5.4 mm.

== Distribution and habitat ==
The species occurs in the Top End of the Northern Territory. The type locality is Black Point on the Cobourg Peninsula.

== Behaviour ==
The adults are flying mellivores.

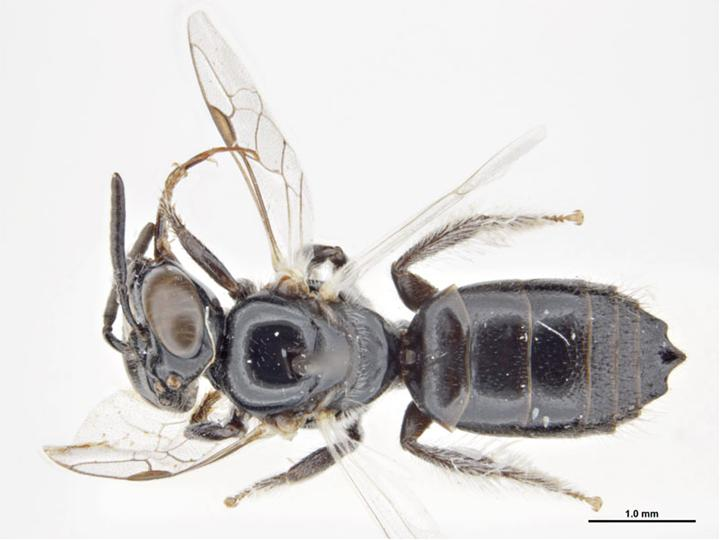
Female, dorsal view
