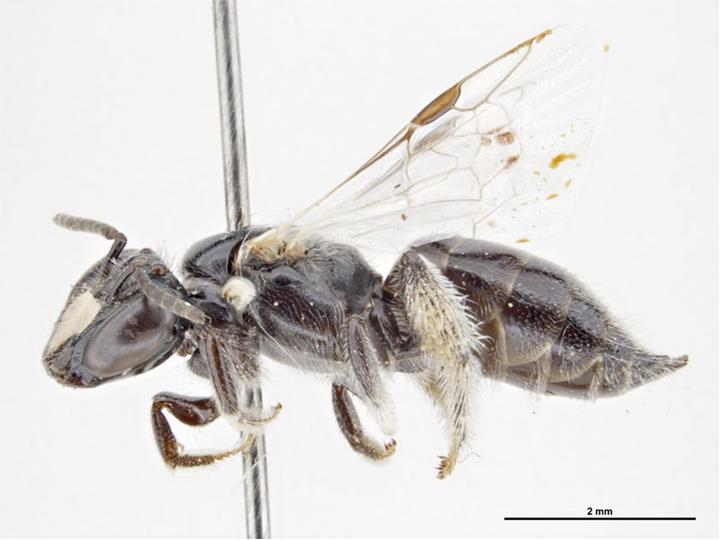
- Female, lateral view

Scientific classification
- Kingdom: Animalia
- Phylum: Arthropoda
- Clade: Pancrustacea
- Class: Insecta
- Order: Hymenoptera
- Family: Apidae
- Genus: Braunsapis
- Species: B. falcata

Binomial name
- Braunsapis falcata Reyes, 1993

= Braunsapis falcata =

Species of bee

Braunsapis falcata is a species of bee in the family Apidae and the tribe Allodapini. It is endemic to Australia. It was described in 1993 by Filipino entomologist Stephen Reyes.

== Etymology ==
The specific epithet falcata is an anatomical reference derived from Latin falcatus (‘curved like a sickle’).

== Description ==
Body length is 4.5–6.0 mm.

== Distribution and habitat ==
The species occurs in northern Australia, the range extending from the Kimberley region, across the Top End into Queensland. The type locality is Derby, Western Australia.

== Behaviour ==
The adults are flying mellivores.

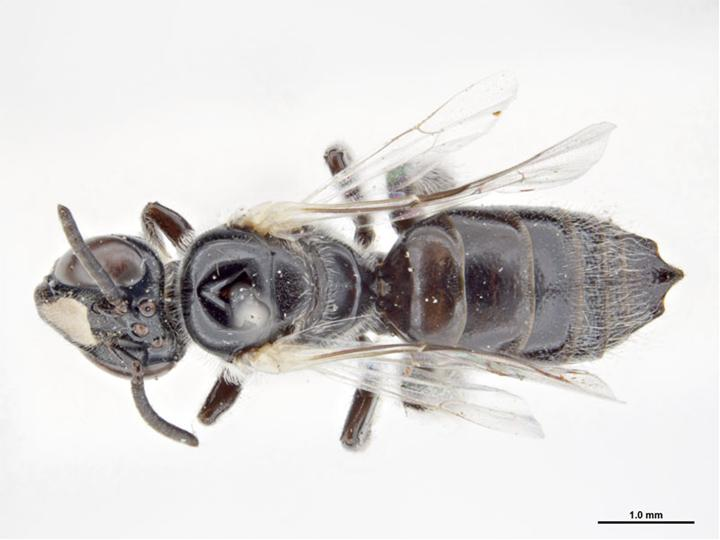
Female, dorsal view
