= Braunsapis biroi =

Scientific classification
- Kingdom: Animalia
- Phylum: Arthropoda
- Clade: Pancrustacea
- Class: Insecta
- Order: Hymenoptera
- Family: Apidae
- Genus: Braunsapis
- Species: B. biroi

Binomial name
- Braunsapis biroi (Friese, 1909)

Synonyms
- Allodape biroi Friese, 1909

Species of bee

Braunsapis biroi is a species of bee in the family Apidae and the tribe Allodapini. It is native to Australia and New Guinea. It was described in 1909 by German entomologist Heinrich Friese.

== Distribution and habitat ==
The type locality is Sattelberg on the Huon Peninsula of Papua New Guinea. In Australia the species occurs in Queensland.

== Behaviour ==
The adults are flying mellivores.
