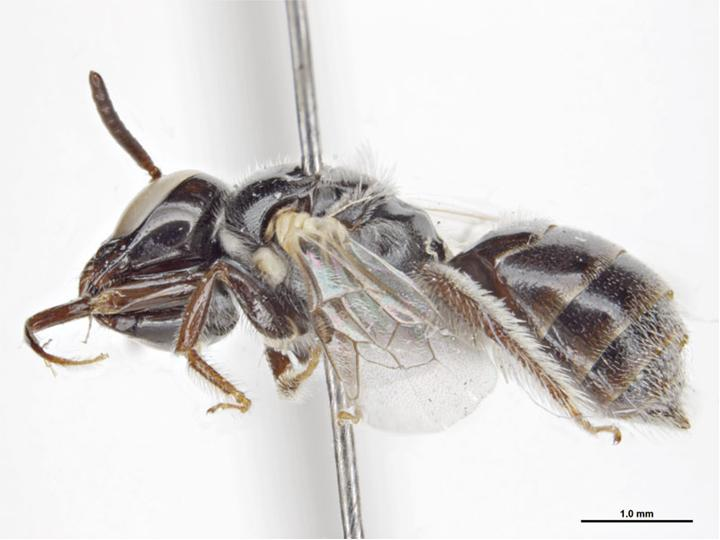
- Female, lateral view

Scientific classification
- Kingdom: Animalia
- Phylum: Arthropoda
- Clade: Pancrustacea
- Class: Insecta
- Order: Hymenoptera
- Family: Apidae
- Genus: Braunsapis
- Species: B. occidentalis

Binomial name
- Braunsapis occidentalis (Michener & Syed, 1962)

Synonyms
- Allodapula occidentalis Michener & Syed, 1962

= Braunsapis occidentalis =

Species of bee

Braunsapis occidentalis is a species of bee in the family Apidae and the tribe Allodapini. It is endemic to Australia. It was described in 1962 by entomologists Charles Duncan Michener and Ishfaq Hussain Syed.

== Description ==
The body length is 7 mm.

== Distribution and habitat ==
The species occurs in Western Australia and the Northern Territory. The type locality is Tambrey, an abandoned sheep station inland from Roebourne in the Pilbara region.

== Behaviour ==
The adults are flying mellivores. Flowering plants visited by the bees include Pentalepis trichodesmoides.

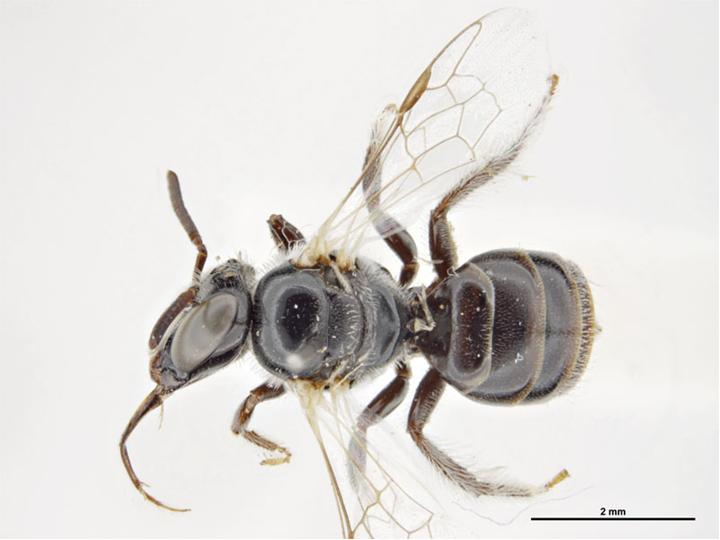
Female, dorsal view
