= Braunsapis minor =

Scientific classification
- Kingdom: Animalia
- Phylum: Arthropoda
- Clade: Pancrustacea
- Class: Insecta
- Order: Hymenoptera
- Family: Apidae
- Genus: Braunsapis
- Species: B. minor

Binomial name
- Braunsapis minor (Michener & Syed, 1962)

Synonyms
- Allodapula minor Michener & Syed, 1962

Species of bee

Braunsapis minor is a species of bee in the family Apidae and the tribe Allodapini. It is endemic to Australia. It was described in 1962 by entomologists Charles Duncan Michener and Ishfaq Hussain Syed.

== Description ==
The body length is 5–5.5 mm.

== Distribution and habitat ==
The species occurs in Queensland. The type locality is Mackay.

== Behaviour ==
The adults are flying mellivores. Flowering plants visited by the bees include Eucalyptus species.
