= Braunsapis cupulifera =

Scientific classification
- Kingdom: Animalia
- Phylum: Arthropoda
- Class: Insecta
- Order: Hymenoptera
- Family: Apidae
- Genus: Braunsapis
- Species: B. cupulifera

Binomial name
- Braunsapis cupulifera (Vachal, 1894)

Synonyms
- Allodape cupulifera Vachal, 1894; Allodape cupulifera bakeri Cockerell, 1916; Allodape hewitti var sandacanensis Cockerell, 1920

Species of bee

Braunsapis cupulifera is a species of bee belonging to the family Apidae and the subfamily Xylocopinae. It is a pollinator of Melocanna baccifera.
