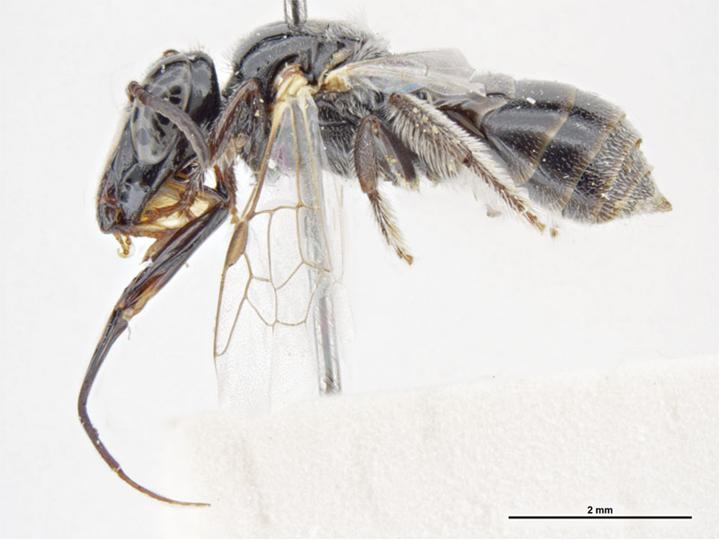
- Female, lateral view

Scientific classification
- Kingdom: Animalia
- Phylum: Arthropoda
- Clade: Pancrustacea
- Class: Insecta
- Order: Hymenoptera
- Family: Apidae
- Genus: Braunsapis
- Species: B. dolichocephala

Binomial name
- Braunsapis dolichocephala Reyes, 1993

= Braunsapis dolichocephala =

Species of bee

Braunsapis dolichocephala is a species of bee in the family Apidae and the tribe Allodapini. It is endemic to Australia. It was described in 1993 by Filipino entomologist Stephen Reyes.

== Etymology ==
The specific epithet dolichocephala is an anatomical reference derived from Greek dolichos (‘long’) and kephale (‘head’).

== Description ==
Body length is 5.8–7.5 mm.

== Distribution and habitat ==
The species occurs in the southern Northern Territory. The type locality is a site 56 km south by east of Alice Springs.

== Behaviour ==
The adults are flying mellivores.

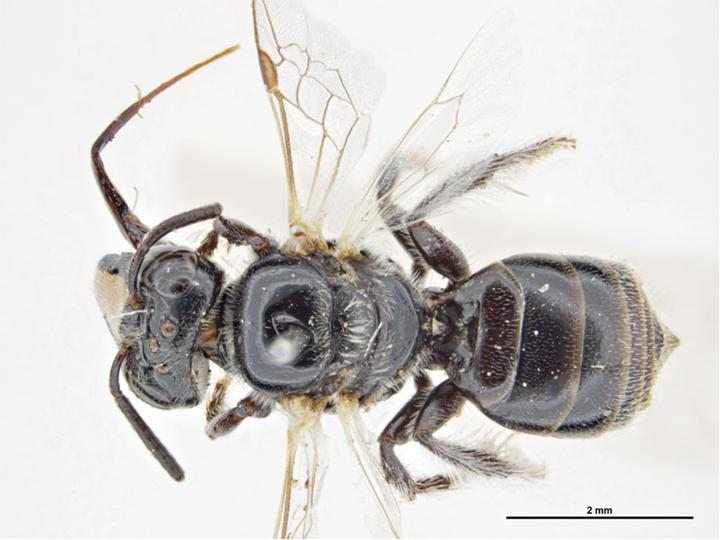
Female, dorsal view
