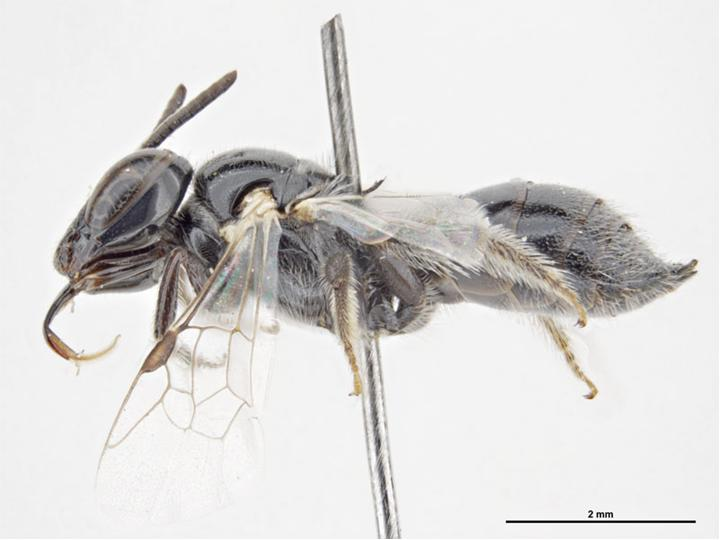
- Female, lateral view

Scientific classification
- Kingdom: Animalia
- Phylum: Arthropoda
- Clade: Pancrustacea
- Class: Insecta
- Order: Hymenoptera
- Family: Apidae
- Genus: Braunsapis
- Species: B. hirsuta

Binomial name
- Braunsapis hirsuta Reyes, 1993

= Braunsapis hirsuta =

Species of bee

Braunsapis hirsuta is a species of bee in the family Apidae and the tribe Allodapini. It is endemic to Australia. It was described in 1993 by Filipino entomologist Stephen Reyes.

== Etymology ==
The specific epithet hirsuta is an anatomical reference derived from Latin hirsutus (‘hairy’).

== Description ==
Body length is 6.1–7.5 mm.

== Distribution and habitat ==
The species occurs in northern Australia, the range extending from the Top End of the Northern Territory eastwards into Queensland. The type locality is Koongarra, some 15 km east of Mount Cahill in Kakadu National Park.

== Behaviour ==
The adults are flying mellivores.

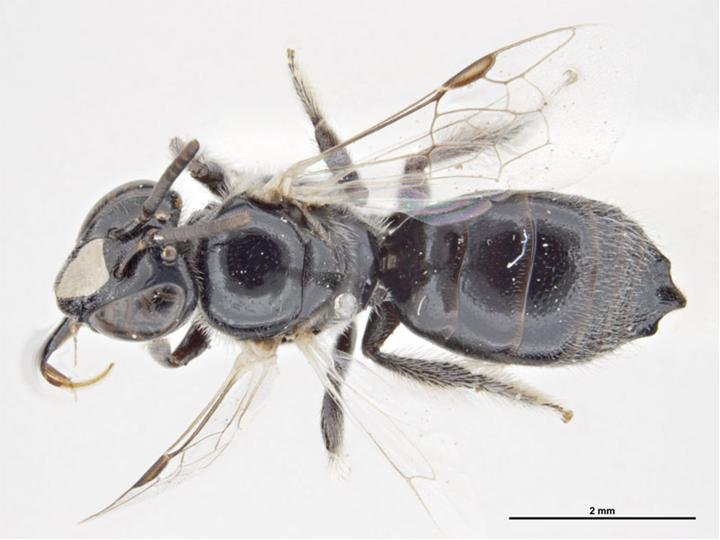
Female, dorsal view
