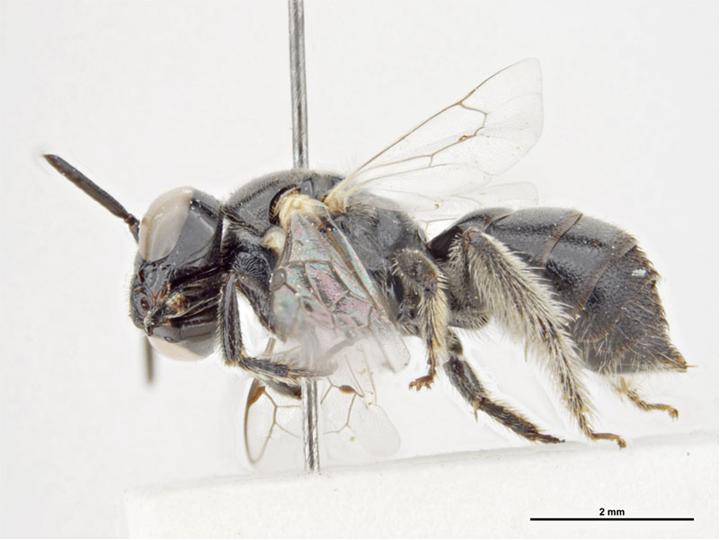
- Female

Scientific classification
- Kingdom: Animalia
- Phylum: Arthropoda
- Clade: Pancrustacea
- Class: Insecta
- Order: Hymenoptera
- Family: Apidae
- Genus: Braunsapis
- Species: B. verticalis

Binomial name
- Braunsapis verticalis Reyes, 1993

= Braunsapis verticalis =

Species of bee

Braunsapis verticalis is a species of bee in the family Apidae and the tribe Allodapini. It is endemic to Australia. It was described in 1993 by Filipino entomologist Stephen Reyes.

== Etymology ==
The specific epithet verticalis is an anatomical reference to the carinated area on the vertex.

== Description ==
Body length is 5.8–7.0 mm.

== Distribution and habitat ==
In Australia the species occurs in the Top End of the Northern Territory. The type locality is Nourlangie Creek, 8 km north of Mount Cahill in Kakadu National Park.

== Behaviour ==
The adults are flying mellivores.
