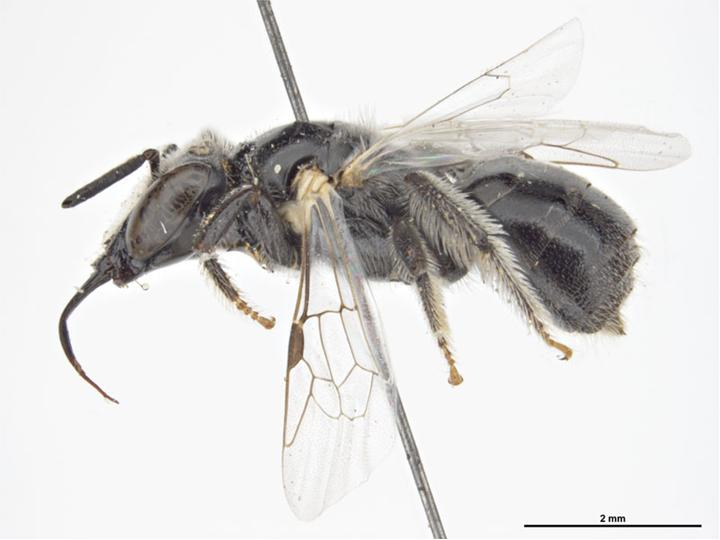
- Female

Scientific classification
- Kingdom: Animalia
- Phylum: Arthropoda
- Clade: Pancrustacea
- Class: Insecta
- Order: Hymenoptera
- Family: Apidae
- Genus: Braunsapis
- Species: B. plebeia

Binomial name
- Braunsapis plebeia (Cockerell, 1929)

Synonyms
- Allodape plebeia Cockerell, 1929

= Braunsapis plebeia =

Species of bee

Braunsapis plebeia is a species of bee in the family Apidae and the tribe Allodapini. It is endemic to Australia. It was described in 1929 by British-American entomologist Theodore Dru Alison Cockerell.

== Distribution and habitat ==
The species occurs in all Australia's mainland states as well as the Northern Territory. The type locality is Thursday Island.

== Behaviour ==
The bees nest in dead, dry, woody twigs, such as those of Stachys. Several females may occupy one nest, with the larvae of various ages found together, not in separate cells.

The adults are flying mellivores. Flowering plants visited by the bees include Plectronia species.
