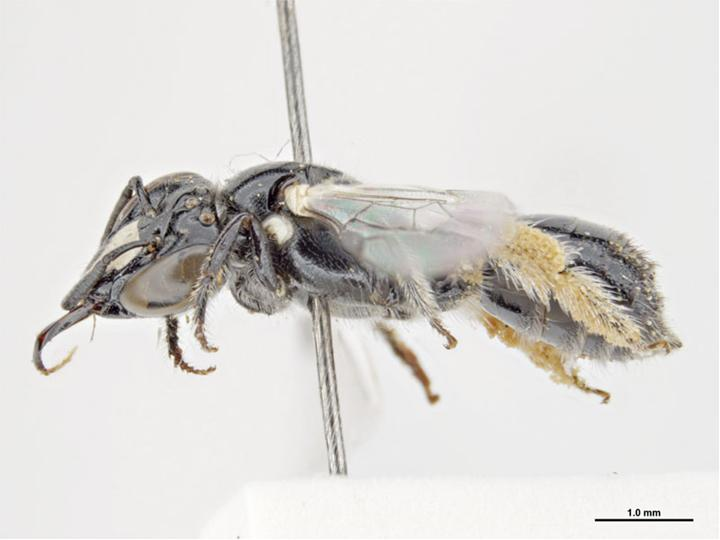
- Female

Scientific classification
- Kingdom: Animalia
- Phylum: Arthropoda
- Clade: Pancrustacea
- Class: Insecta
- Order: Hymenoptera
- Family: Apidae
- Genus: Braunsapis
- Species: B. unicolor

Binomial name
- Braunsapis unicolor (Smith, 1854)

Synonyms
- Allodape unicolor Smith, 1854

= Braunsapis unicolor =

Species of bee

Braunsapis unicolor is a species of bee in the family Apidae and the tribe Allodapini. It is endemic to Australia. It was described in 1854 by English entomologist Frederick Smith.

== Distribution and habitat ==
The species occurs across much of mainland Australia.

== Behaviour ==
The bees nest in dead, dry twigs, such as those of Callistemon, Cassia, Lantana, and in the flower stalks of Xanthorrhoea grasstrees. Several females may occupy one nest, with larvae of different ages found together, not in separate cells.

The adults are flying mellivores. Flowering plants visited by the bees include Acacia, Angophora, Callistemon, Eucalyptus, Hibbertia, Jacksonia, Leptospermum, Leucopogon, Melaleuca, Persoonia, Pultenaea, Tristania and Velleia species.

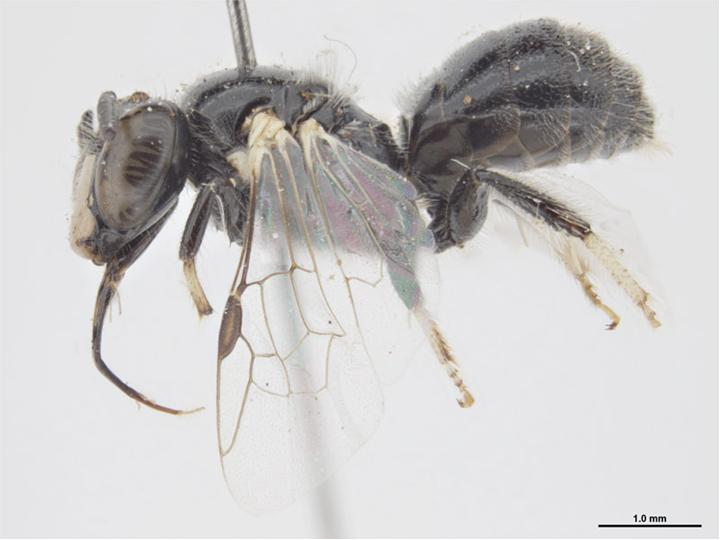
Male
