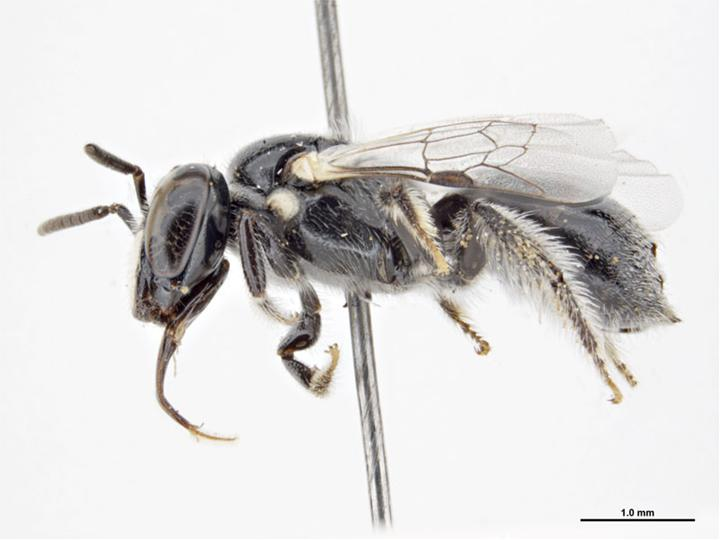
- Female, lateral view

Scientific classification
- Kingdom: Animalia
- Phylum: Arthropoda
- Clade: Pancrustacea
- Class: Insecta
- Order: Hymenoptera
- Family: Apidae
- Genus: Braunsapis
- Species: B. diminuta

Binomial name
- Braunsapis diminuta (Cockerell, 1915)

Synonyms
- Allodape diminuta Cockerell, 1915

= Braunsapis diminuta =

Species of bee

Braunsapis diminuta is a species of bee in the family Apidae and the tribe Allodapini. It is endemic to Australia. It was described in 1915 by British-American entomologist Theodore Dru Alison Cockerell.

== Description ==
The body length is 5 mm. The head, thorax and abdomen are black.

== Distribution and habitat ==
The species occurs in New South Wales, the Northern Territory, Queensland and Western Australia. The type locality is Yarrawin, New South Wales.

== Behaviour ==
The bees nest in dead, dry, woody twigs, such as those of Cassia. Several females may occupy one nest, with the larvae of various ages found together, not in separate cells.

The adults are flying mellivores. Flowering plants visited by the bees include Bursaria, Callistemon and Loranthus species.

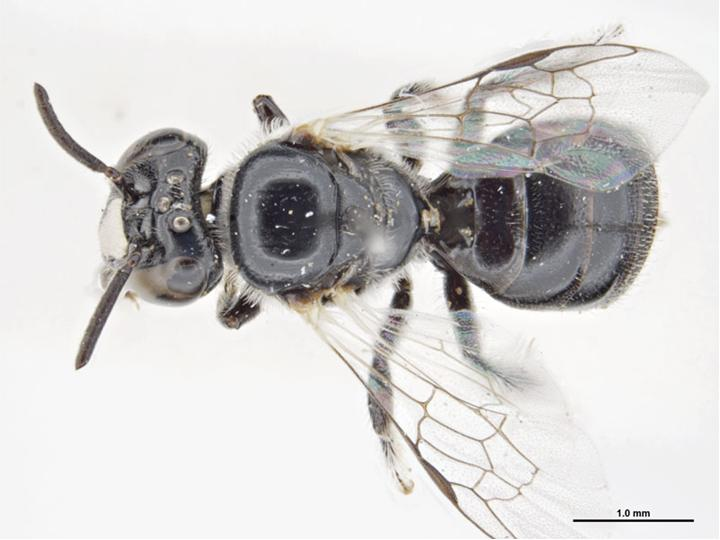
Female, dorsal view
