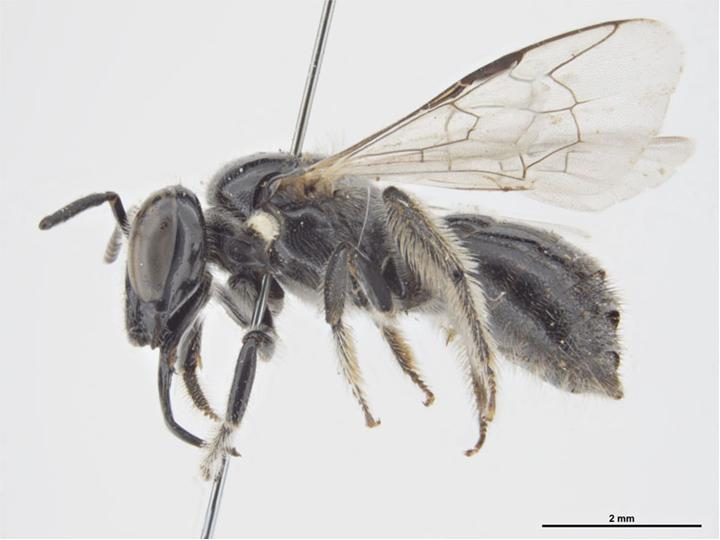
- Female

Scientific classification
- Kingdom: Animalia
- Phylum: Arthropoda
- Clade: Pancrustacea
- Class: Insecta
- Order: Hymenoptera
- Family: Apidae
- Genus: Braunsapis
- Species: B. simillima

Binomial name
- Braunsapis simillima (Smith, 1854)

Synonyms
- Allodape simillima Smith, 1854

= Braunsapis simillima =

Species of bee

Braunsapis simillima is a species of bee in the family Apidae and the tribe Allodapini. It is native to Australia and New Guinea. It was described in 1854 by English entomologist Frederick Smith.

== Distribution and habitat ==
The species occurs across much of northern and eastern mainland Australia as well as in New Guinea. The type locality is the Macintyre River in New South Wales.

== Behaviour ==
The bees nest in dead, dry twigs, such as those of Leptospermum, and in the flower stalks of Xanthorrhoea grasstrees. Several females may occupy one nest, with larvae of different ages found together, not in separate cells.

The adults are flying mellivores. Flowering plants visited by the bees include Acacia, Angophora, Callistemon, Eucalyptus, Hibbertia, Jacksonia, Leptospermum, Leucopogon, Lomatia, Loranthus, Melaleuca, Persoonia, Pultenaea, Tristania and Velleia species.

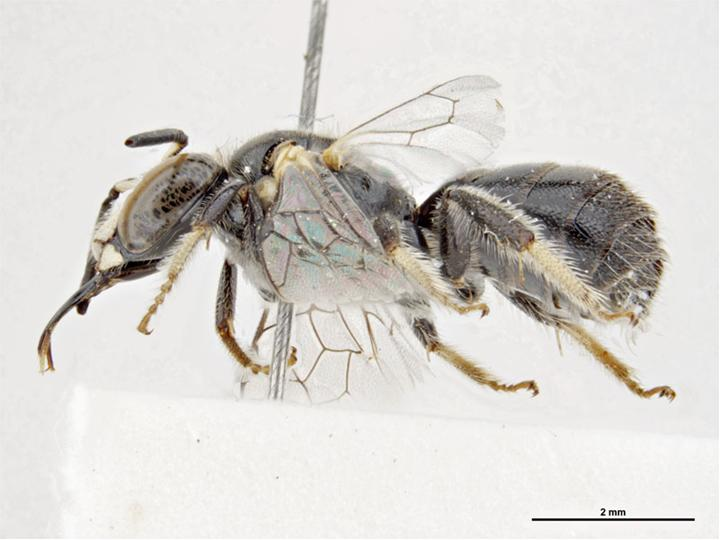
Male
