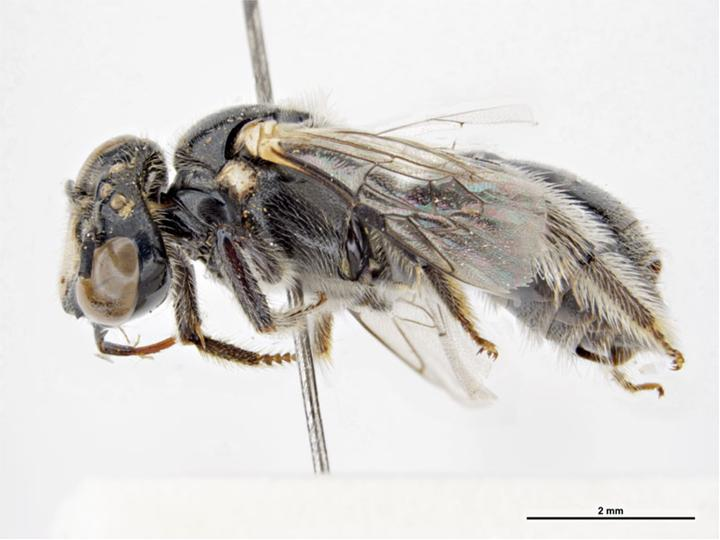
- Female, lateral view

Scientific classification
- Kingdom: Animalia
- Phylum: Arthropoda
- Clade: Pancrustacea
- Class: Insecta
- Order: Hymenoptera
- Family: Apidae
- Genus: Braunsapis
- Species: B. clarissima

Binomial name
- Braunsapis clarissima (Cockerell, 1929)

Synonyms
- Allodape clarissima Cockerell, 1929; Allodapula perkinsiella Michener & Syed, 1962

= Braunsapis clarissima =

Species of bee

Braunsapis clarissima is a species of bee in the family Apidae and the tribe Allodapini. It is endemic to Australia. It was described in 1929 by British-American entomologist Theodore Dru Alison Cockerell.

== Distribution and habitat ==
The species occurs in New South Wales, the Northern Territory, Queensland and Western Australia. Type localities are Thursday Island and Mackay.

== Behaviour ==
The bees nest in dead, dry, woody twigs, such as those of Cassia. Several females may occupy one nest, with the larvae of various ages found together, not in separate cells.

The adults are flying mellivores. Flowering plants visited by the bees include Cassia and Eucalyptus species.

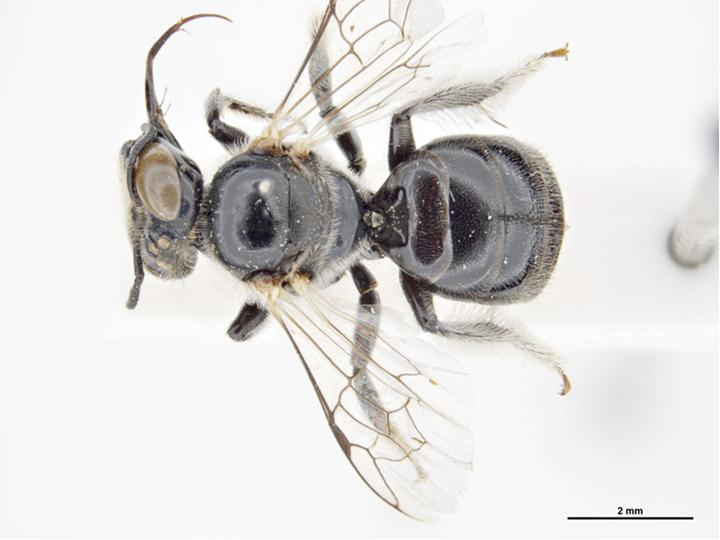
Female, dorsal view
