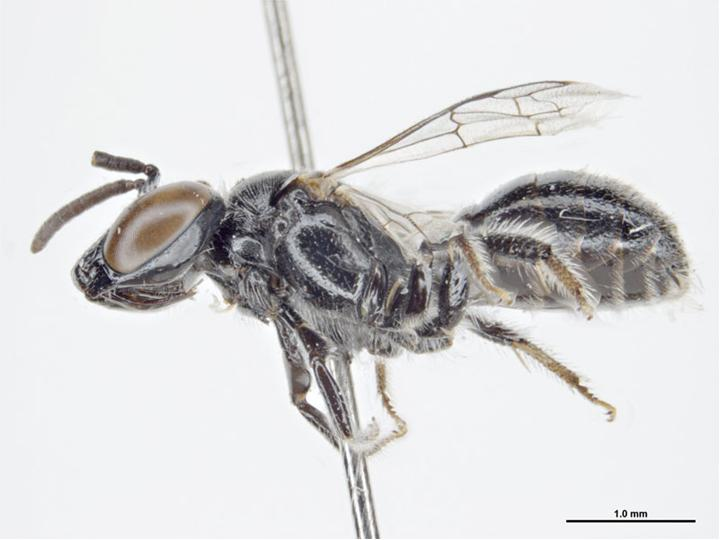
- Male, lateral view

Scientific classification
- Kingdom: Animalia
- Phylum: Arthropoda
- Clade: Pancrustacea
- Class: Insecta
- Order: Hymenoptera
- Family: Apidae
- Genus: Braunsapis
- Species: B. anthracina

Binomial name
- Braunsapis anthracina Reyes, 1993

= Braunsapis anthracina =

Species of bee

Braunsapis anthracina is a species of bee in the family Apidae and the tribe Allodapini. It is endemic to Australia. It was described in 1993 by Filipino entomologist Stephen Reyes.

== Etymology ==
The specific epithet anthracina is derived from Latin anthracinus (‘coal-black’), with reference to colouration.

== Description ==
Body length is 4.25–5.2 mm. The overall body colour is black.

== Distribution and habitat ==
The species occurs in the tropical Kimberley region of northern Western Australia. The type locality is Martins Well in the West Kimberley.

== Behaviour ==
The adults are flying mellivores.

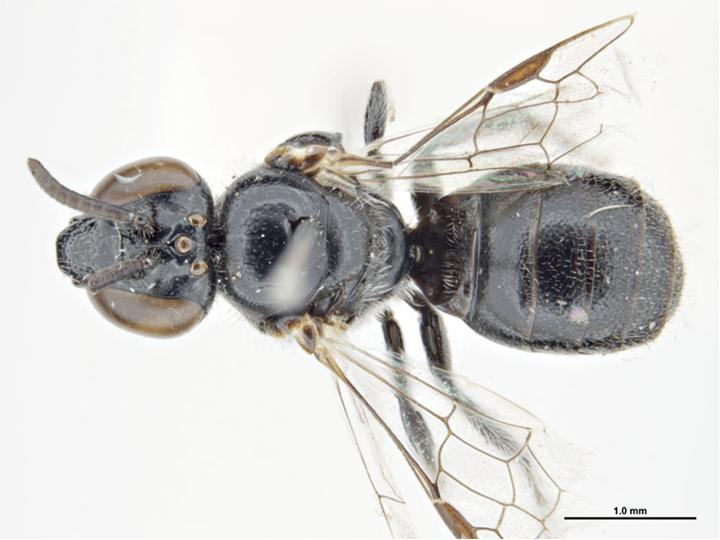
Male, dorsal view
