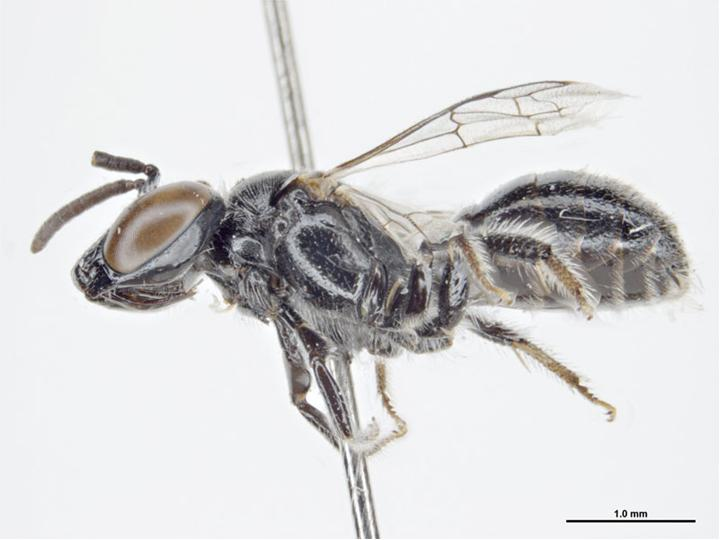
- Braunsapis anthracina

Scientific classification
- Kingdom: Animalia
- Phylum: Arthropoda
- Clade: Pancrustacea
- Class: Insecta
- Order: Hymenoptera
- Family: Apidae
- Tribe: Allodapini
- Genus: Braunsapis; Michener, 1969

= Braunsapis =

Genus of bees

Braunsapis is a genus of bees in the family Apidae and the tribe Allodapini, commonly known as reed bees. It is the largest genus of the tribe and is known for its array of sociality. The genus is distributed in Africa, Asia, and Australasia.

Most of these bees are slender and black, though some are paler or reddish.

Like other allodapines, bees of this genus raise young in a nest burrow. Burrows are dug in the pith of plants, such as African blue basil and lantana.

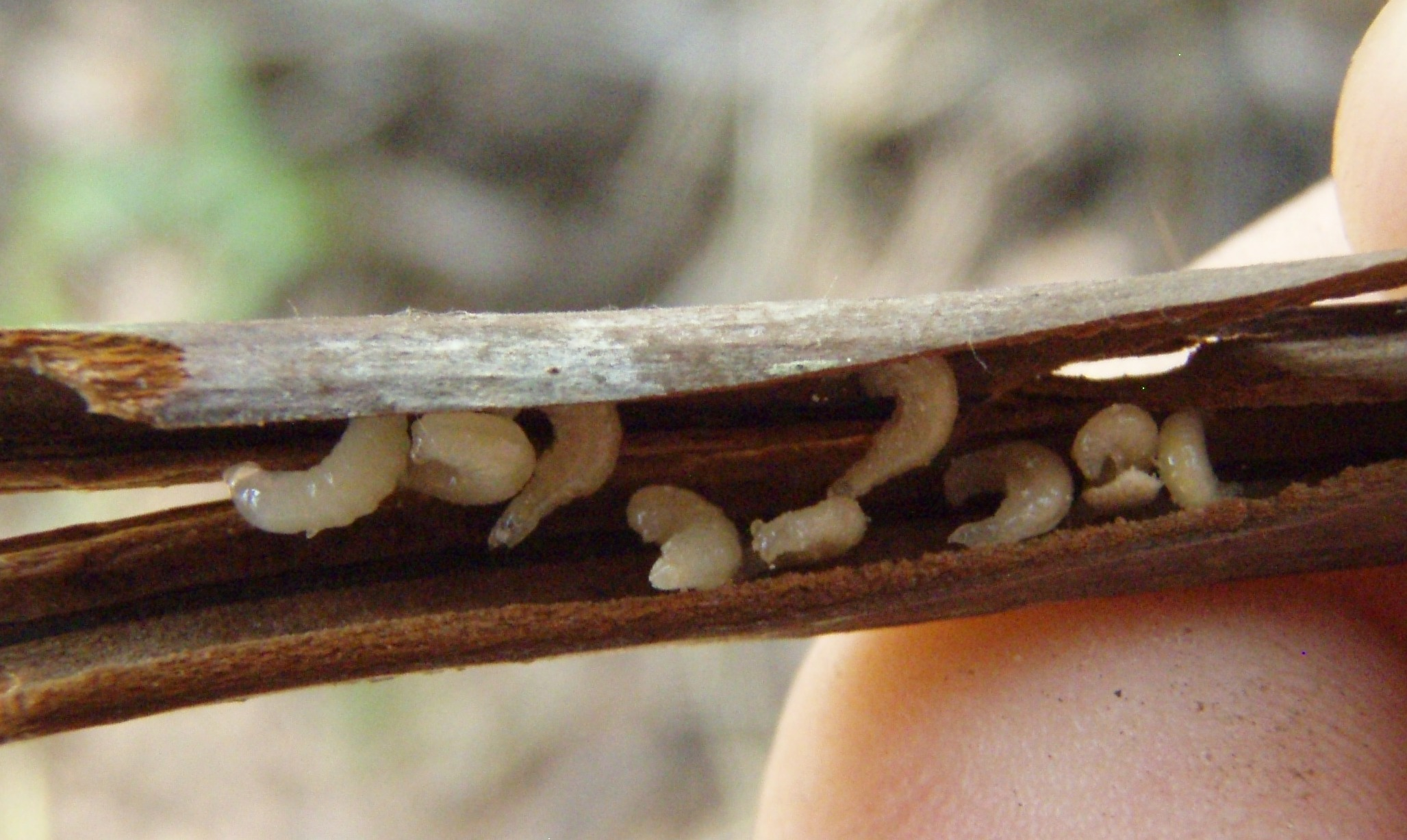
Braunsapis larvae inside a nest burrow

== Species ==
See: List of Braunsapis species
